= Louise Ekman =

Swedish high jumper (born 1997)

Personal information
- Nationality: Swedish
- Born: 10 April 1997 (age 29)

Sport
- Sport: Athletics
- Event: High jump

Achievements and titles
- Personal best: High jump: 1.96m (2026)

Louise Ekman (born 10 April 1997) is a Swedish high jumper. She won the Swedish Indoor Championships in 2023. In 2026, she moved to third on the Swedish all-time indoor list with a jump of 1.96 metres, later placing sixth overall at the 2026 World Indoor Championships.

== Biography ==
From Gävle, Ekman is coached by Bengt Jönsson, and is a member of Gefle IF. She was a finalist in the high jump at the 2019 European Athletics U23 Championships. Ekman placed third at the 2021 Swedish Indoor Athletics Championships in Malmö with 1.83 metres, and was runner-up the following year behind Maja Nilsson with a jump of 1.84 metres.

Ekman won the Swedish Indoor Athletics Championships in 2023 February in Malmö, winning ahead of Bianca Salming with 1.81 metres. Later that year, she was also runner-up competing outdoors at the 2023 Nordic Athletics Championships in Copenhagen and the Swedish Athletics Championships in Söderhamn.

In June 2024, she jumped 1.85 to place third at the Swedish Athletics Championships in Uddevalla. In February 2025, she cleared 1.87 metres to place second behind Engla Nilsson at the Swedish Indoor Championships in Växjö. In August, she was runner-up to Ella Junnila at the Finnkampen in Stockholm.

At the start of 2026, Ekman added nine centimetres to her personal best, first jumping 1.91 meters in Lyon, France, before having a third place finish in February at the Banskobystricka latka in Banská Bystrica, Slovakia, a World Athletics Indoor Tour Silver meeting, with 1.96 metres. The jump moved her third on the Swedish all-time indoor list and was the best jump by a Swedish indoors for 12 years. It also met the automatic standard for the 2026 World Indoor Championships. Competing at the 2026 World Athletics Indoor Championships in Poland, she placed sixth with a cleared height of 1.93 metres.

On 15 August, she placed sixth with a clearance of 1.88 metres at the 2026 European Championships in Birmingham, England.
