= 2025 European Athletics Indoor Championships – Women's high jump =

Women's high jump at the 2025 European Athletics Indoor Championships
- Venue: Omnisport Apeldoorn
- Location: Apeldoorn, Netherlands
- Dates: 7 March 2025 (qualification); 9 March 2025 (final)
- Competitors: 19 from 15 nations
- Winning mark: 1.99

Medalists
gold medal	Yaroslava Mahuchikh	Ukraine
silver medal	Angelina Topić	Serbia
bronze medal	Engla Nilsson	Sweden

The women's high jump at the 2025 European Athletics Indoor Championships was held on the short track of Omnisport in Apeldoorn, Netherlands, on 6 and 7 March 2025. This was the 38th time the event is contested at the European Athletics Indoor Championships. Athletes can qualify by achieving the entry standard or by their World Athletics Ranking in the event.

The qualifying round was scheduled for 7 March during the morning session. The final was scheduled for 9 March during the evening session.

== Background ==
The women's high jump was contested 37 times before 2025, held every time since the first edition of the European Athletics Indoor Championships (1970–2023). The 2025 European Athletics Indoor Championships will be held in Omnisport Apeldoorn in Apeldoorn, Netherlands. The removable indoor athletics track was retopped for these championships in September 2024.

Kajsa Bergqvist is the world and European record holder in the event, with a height of 2.08 m, set in 2006. The championship record was set at the 2007 championships by Tia Hellebaut,

Records before the 2025 European Athletics Indoor Championships
Record	Athlete (nation)	Height (m)	Location	Date
World record	Kajsa Bergqvist (SWE)	2.08	Arnstadt, Germany	4 February 2006
European record	Kajsa Bergqvist (SWE)	2.08	Arnstadt, Germany	4 February 2006
Championship record	Tia Hellebaut (BEL)	2.05	Birmingham, Great Britain	3 March 2007
World leading	Yaroslava Mahuchikh (UKR)	2.01	Banská Bystrica, Slovakia	18 February 2025
European leading	Yaroslava Mahuchikh (UKR)	2.01	Banská Bystrica, Slovakia	18 February 2025

== Qualification ==
For the women's high jump, the qualification period runs from 25 February 2024 until 23 February 2025. Athletes can qualify by achieving the entry standards of 1.96 m or by virtue of their World Athletics Ranking for the event. There is a target number of 18 athletes.

== Rounds ==
=== Qualification ===
The qualifying round was held on 7 March, starting at 11:00 (UTC+1) in the morning. All athletes meeting the Qualification Standard of 1.92 m (Q) or at least 8 best performers (q) advance to the Final.

Results of the qualification round
Rank	Athlete	Nation	1.75	1.80	1.85	1.89	1.92	Result	Notes	PB
1	Morgan Lake	Great Britain	−	o	o	o		1.89	q	1.99
1	Yaroslava Mahuchikh	Ukraine	−	−	−	o		1.89	q	2.10
1	Engla Nilsson	Sweden	o	o	o	o		1.89	q, PB	1.88
1	Imke Onnen	Germany	−	o	o	o		1.89	q	1.96
1	Angelina Topić	Serbia	−	o	o	o		1.89	q	1.98
6	Marija Vuković	Montenegro	o	o	xo	xo		1.89	q	1.97
7	Elisabeth Pihela	Estonia	o	o	xxo	xo		1.89	q, SB	1.92
8	Lilianna Bátori	Hungary	o	o	o	xxo		1.89	q	1.93
8	Christina Honsel	Germany	−	o	o	xxo		1.89	q	1.98
10	Michaela Hrubá	Czech Republic	o	xo	o	xxx		1.85		1.95
11	Tatiana Gusin	Greece	o	o	xo	xxx		1.85	=SB	1.94
11	Britt Weerman	Netherlands	o	o	xo	xxx		1.85		1.96
11	Buse Savaşkan	Turkey	o	o	xo	xxx		1.85	=SB	1.92
11	Kateryna Tabashnyk	Ukraine	o	o	xo	xxx		1.85		1.99
15	Idea Pieroni	Italy	xo	x	xo	xxx		1.85		1.93
16	Yuliya Chumachenko	Ukraine	o	o	xxx			1.80		1.94
16	Heta Tuuri	Finland	o	o	xxx			1.80		1.91
18	Ella Junnila	Finland	−	xo	xx-	x		1.80		1.97
19	Patrīcija Jansone	Latvia	o	xxo	xxx			1.80		1.88

=== Final ===
The final was held on 9 March, starting at 17:05 (UTC+1) in the afternoon.

Results of the final
Rank	Athlete	Nation	1.80	1.85	1.89	1.92	1.95	1.97	1.99	Result	Notes
1st place, gold medalist(s)	Yaroslava Mahuchikh	Ukraine	–	–	–	o	o	o	xo	1.99	
2nd place, silver medalist(s)	Angelina Topić	Serbia	o	o	o	xo	xo	–	xxx	1.95	
3rd place, bronze medalist(s)	Engla Nilsson	Sweden	o	o	o	o	xxx			1.92	PB
4	Christina Honsel	Germany	o	o	o	xo	xxx			1.92	
5	Morgan Lake	Great Britain	o	xo	o	xxo	x–	xx		1.92	
6	Elisabeth Pihela	Estonia	o	o	xo	xxx				1.89	=SB
6	Imke Onnen	Germany	o	o	xo	xxx				1.89	
8	Marija Vuković	Montenegro	o	xxo	xxx					1.85	
9	Lilianna Bátori	Hungary	o	xxx						1.80	
