= 2021 European Athletics Indoor Championships – Women's high jump =

2021 women's high jump competition

The women's high jump event at the 2021 European Athletics Indoor Championships was held on 5 March at 19:13 (qualification) and 7 March at 17:45 (final) local time.

== Medalists ==
Gold	Silver	Bronze
Yaroslava Mahuchikh; Ukraine	Iryna Herashchenko; Ukraine	Ella Junnila; Finland

== Records ==
Standing records prior to the 2021 European Athletics Indoor Championships
World record	Kajsa Bergqvist (SWE)	2.08	Arnstadt, Germany	4 February 2006
European record	Kajsa Bergqvist (SWE)	2.08	Arnstadt, Germany	4 February 2006
Championship record	Tia Hellebaut (BEL)	2.05	Birmingham, United Kingdom	3 March 2007
World Leading	Yaroslava Mahuchikh (UKR)	2.06	Banská Bystrica, Slovakia	2 February 2021
European Leading	Yaroslava Mahuchikh (UKR)	2.06	Banská Bystrica, Slovakia	2 February 2021

== Results ==
=== Qualification ===
Qualification: Qualifying performance 1.91 (Q) or at least 8 best performers (q) advance to the Final.

Rank	Athlete	Nationality	1.76	1.82	1.87	1.91	1.94	Result	Note
1	Iryna Herashchenko	Ukraine	o	o	o	o		1.91	q
1	Yaroslava Mahuchikh	Ukraine	–	o	o	o		1.91	q
1	Alessia Trost	Italy	o	o	o	o		1.91	q
4	Daniela Stanciu	Romania	o	o	o	xo		1.91	q, SB
4	Marija Vuković	Montenegro	–	o	o	xo		1.91	q
6	Ella Junnila	Finland	–	o	xo	xo		1.91	q
7	Yuliya Levchenko	Ukraine	o	o	o	xxo		1.91	q
8	Emily Borthwick	Great Britain	xo	o	xxo	xxo		1.91	q, PB
9	Lia Apostolovski	Slovenia	o	o	o	xxx		1.87	=SB
9	Karyna Demidik	Belarus	–	o	o	xxx		1.87	
9	Maja Nilsson	Sweden	o	o	o	xxx		1.87	
12	Ioanna Zakka	Greece	o	xo	o	xxx		1.87	PB
13	Morgan Lake	Great Britain	–	xxo	o	xxx		1.87	
14	Elena Vallortigara	Italy	o	xo	xo	xxx		1.87	
15	Salome Lang	Switzerland	o	o	xxo	xxx		1.87	
15	Merel Maes	Belgium	o	o	xxo	xxx		1.87	
17	Lilian Turban	Estonia	o	xxo	xxo	xxx		1.87	=PB

=== Final ===
Rank	Athlete	Nationality	1.80	1.85	1.89	1.92	1.94	1.96	1.98	2.00	2.07	Result	Note
1st place, gold medalist(s)	Yaroslava Mahuchikh	Ukraine	–	o	o	–	o	–	o	o	xxx	2.00	
2nd place, silver medalist(s)	Iryna Herashchenko	Ukraine	o	o	o	xxo	xxo	o	o	xxx		1.98	PB
3rd place, bronze medalist(s)	Ella Junnila	Finland	o	o	o	o	xxo	o	xxx			1.96	NR
4	Yuliya Levchenko	Ukraine	o	o	o	o	o	xxx				1.94	
5	Daniela Stanciu	Romania	o	o	o	o	xxx					1.92	SB
6	Alessia Trost	Italy	o	o	o	xo	xxx					1.92	
7	Marija Vuković	Montenegro	o	o	xxo	xxo	xxx					1.92	
8	Emily Borthwick	Great Britain	o	xxo	xxx							1.85	
