= 2025 European Athletics U23 Championships – Women's high jump =

Women's high jump at the 2025 European Athletics U23 Championships
- Venue: Fana Stadion
- Location: Bergen, Norway
- Dates: 17 July (qualification); 19 July (final)
- Winning height: 1.95 m

Medalists
gold medal	Angelina Topić	Serbia
silver medal	Engla Nilsson	Sweden
bronze medal	Joana Herrmann	Germany

The women's high jump event at the 2025 European Athletics U23 Championships was held in Bergen, Norway, at Fana Stadion on 17 and 19 July.

== Records ==
Prior to the competition, the records were as follows:

Record	Athlete (nation)	Height (m)	Location	Date
European U23 record	Stefka Kostadinova (BUL)	2.09 m	Rome, Italy	30 August 1987
Championship U23 record	Yaroslava Mahuchikh (UKR)	2.00 m	Tallinn, Estonia	10 July 2021

== Results ==
=== Qualification ===
All athletes over 1.87 m (Q) or at least the 12 best performers (q) advance to the final.

==== Group A ====
Place	Athlete	Nation	1.68	1.73	1.77	1.81	Result	Notes
1	Federica Gabriela Apostol	Romania	o	o	o	o	1.81 m	q
1	Patrīcija Jansone	Latvia	–	o	o	o	1.81 m	q
1	Mia Guldteig Lien	Norway	o	o	o	o	1.81 m	q
1	Elisabeth Pihela	Estonia	–	–	o	xo	1.81 m	q
1	Celia Rifaterra	Spain	o	o	o	o	1.81 m	q
1	Angelina Topić	Serbia	–	–	o	o	1.81 m	q
7	Johanna Göring	Germany	o	xo	o	o	1.81 m	
8	Aurora Vicini	Italy	o	o	xo	xxo	1.81 m	
9	Ela Velepec	Slovenia	–	o	o	xxx	1.77 m	
10	Satera Balčaitytė	Lithuania	o	o	xxx		1.73 m	
10	Luca Keszthelyi	Hungary	o	o	xxx		1.73 m	
12	Iryna Bezsmertna	Ukraine	xo	o	xxx		1.73 m	
13	Birta María Haraldsdóttir	Iceland	–	xo	xxx		1.73 m	
14	Britt Weerman	Netherlands	–	–	–	xr	NM	

==== Group B ====
Place	Athlete	Nation	1.68	1.73	1.77	1.81	Result	Notes
1	Styliana Ioannidou	Cyprus	–	o	o	o	1.81 m	q
2	Joana Herrmann	Germany	o	o	xo	o	1.81 m	q
2	Alicja Wysocka	Poland	o	xo	o	o	1.81 m	q
4	Engla Nilsson	Sweden	–	–	xxo	o	1.81 m	q
5	Federica Stella	Italy	o	xo	xxo	o	1.81 m	q, PB
6	Merel Maes	Belgium	–	–	xo	o	1.81 m	q
7	Eva Maria Baldursdóttir	Iceland	o	o	o	xxx	1.77 m	
8	Aoife O'Sullivan	Ireland	o	xo	o	xxx	1.77 m	
9	Berra Aygün	Turkey	–	o	xo	xxx	1.77 m	
9	Veronika Kramarenko	Ukraine	o	o	xo	xxx	1.77 m	
9	Anna-Sophie Schmitt	Germany	o	o	xo	xxx	1.77 m	
12	Edlin Lisbeth Laur	Estonia	o	o	xxo	xxx	1.77 m	
13	Zdara Pezinková	Czech Republic	o	xxx			1.68 m	
14	Evelina Bukauskaite	Lithuania	xo	xxx			1.68 m	

=== Final ===
Place	Athlete	Nation	1.75	1.80	1.84	1.87	1.89	1.91	1.93	1.95	1.97	Result	Notes
1st place, gold medalist(s)	Angelina Topić	Serbia	o	o	o	o	o	xo	o	xo	r	1.95 m	
2nd place, silver medalist(s)	Engla Nilsson	Sweden	o	o	o	o	o	o	o	xxx		1.93 m	
3rd place, bronze medalist(s)	Joana Herrmann	Germany	o	o	xo	o	o	xxo	xxx			1.91 m	PB
4	Styliana Ioannidou	Cyprus	o	xo	xo	xxo	xo	xxo	xxx			1.91 m	PB
5	Johanna Göring	Germany	o	o	o	xxx						1.84 m	=SB
5	Mia Guldteig Lien	Norway	o	o	o	xxx						1.84 m	PB
7	Merel Maes	Belgium	o	o	xo	xxx						1.84 m	
7	Elisabeth Pihela	Estonia	o	o	xo	xxx						1.84 m	
9	Federica Gabriela Apostol	Romania	o	o	xxo	xxx						1.84 m	=SB
9	Alicja Wysocka	Poland	o	o	xxo	xxx						1.84 m	
11	Celia Rifaterra	Spain	o	o	xxx							1.80 m	
12	Patrīcija Jansone	Latvia	o	xxo	xxx							1.80 m	
12	Aurora Vicini	Italy	o	xxo	xxx							1.80 m	
14	Federica Stella	Italy	xo	xxx								1.75 m	
