= Athletics at the 2019 Summer Universiade – Women's high jump =

The women's high jump event at the 2019 Summer Universiade was held on 11 and 13 July at the Stadio San Paolo in Naples.

== Medalists ==
Gold	Silver	Bronze
Yuliia Chumachenko; Ukraine	Iryna Gerashchenko; Ukraine	Imke Onnen; Germany

== Results ==
=== Qualification ===
Qualification: 1.91 m (Q) or at least 12 best (q) qualified for the final.

Rank	Group	Name	Nationality	1.65	1.70	1.75	1.80	Result	Notes
1	A	Iryna Gerashchenko	Ukraine	–	–	o	o	1.80	q
1	B	Imke Onnen	Germany	–	–	o	o	1.80	q
1	B	Nadezhda Dubovitskaya	Kazakhstan	–	o	o	o	1.80	q
1	B	Yuliia Chumachenko	Ukraine	–	–	o	o	1.80	q
5	A	Alysha Burnett	Australia	–	–	xo	o	1.80	q
6	B	Keeley O'Hagan	New Zealand	–	o	o	xo	1.80	q
7	A	Kadriye Aydın	Turkey	–	o	xo	xo	1.80	q
8	A	Evelina Erlandsson	Sweden	–	o	o	xxo	1.80	q
9	B	Julia du Plessis	South Africa	–	o	xo	xxx	1.75	q
10	B	Tyra Gittens	Trinidad and Tobago	–	xo	xo	xxx	1.75	q
11	B	Fatima El Alaoui	Morocco	o	o	xxo	xxx	1.75	q
12	A	Tsai Ching-jung	Chinese Taipei	o	xo	xxo	xxx	1.75	q
12	B	Wang Hong	China	o	xo	xxo	xxx	1.75	q
14	B	Sakari Famous	Bermuda	o	xxo	xxo	xxx	1.75	
15	A	Monika Podlogar	Slovenia	o	o	xxx		1.70	
15	B	Nadia Anggraini	Indonesia	o	o	xxx		1.70	SB
17	A	Supriya Sindi Basavaraju	India	xo	o	xxx		1.70	
18	A	Imogen Skelton	New Zealand	o	xo	xxx		1.70	
19	A	Erikah Seyama	Eswatini	–	xxo	xxx		1.70	
19	B	Tsai Min-ting	Chinese Taipei	o	xxo	xxx		1.70	
21	A	Afaf Ben Hadja	Algeria	xo	xxo	xxx		1.70	
22	A	Celina Harte	Argentina	o	xxx			1.65	
22	A	Elise Martinsen Nedberg	Norway	o	xxx			1.65	
24	B	Khadidja Ameur	Algeria	xxo	xxx			1.65	
24	B	Abhinaya Sudhakar Shetty	India	xxo	xxx			1.65	
	A	Safina Sadullaeva	Uzbekistan					DNS	

=== Final ===
Rank	Name	Nationality	1.70	1.75	1.80	1.84	1.88	1.91	1.94	1.96	Result	Notes
1st place, gold medalist(s)	Yuliia Chumachenko	Ukraine	–	o	o	o	o	o	o	xxx	1.94	PB
2nd place, silver medalist(s)	Iryna Gerashchenko	Ukraine	–	–	o	o	o	o	xxx		1.91	
3rd place, bronze medalist(s)	Imke Onnen	Germany	–	–	o	o	xo	o	xxx		1.91	
4	Alysha Burnett	Australia	–	o	o	o	xxo	x–	xx		1.88	
5	Keeley O'Hagan	New Zealand	o	o	xxo	xo	xxx				1.84	SB
6	Nadezhda Dubovitskaya	Kazakhstan	o	o	o	xxx					1.80	
6	Evelina Erlandsson	Sweden	o	o	o	xxx					1.80	
6	Kadriye Aydın	Turkey	o	–	o	xxx					1.80	
9	Fatima El Alaoui	Morocco	o	o	xxx						1.75	
9	Tyra Gittens	Trinidad and Tobago	o	o	xxx						1.75	
11	Wang Hong	China	xo	o	xxx						1.75	
12	Julia du Plessis	South Africa	o	xo	xxx						1.75	
12	Tsai Ching-jung	Chinese Taipei	o	xo	xxx						1.75	
