= 2017 South American U20 Championships in Athletics =

XLII South American U20 Championships in Athletics
- Dates: 3–4 June
- Host city: Leonora, Guyana
- Venue: National Track and Field Centre
- Level: Junior
- Events: 41
- Participation: 11 nations

The 42nd South American U20 Championships in Athletics were held in Leonora, Guyana, on 3 and 4 June. It was the first time that this competition was held in Guyana.

== Medal summary ==
=== Men ===
Event	Gold		Silver		Bronze	
100 metres -1.6 m/s	Compton Caesar; Guyana	10.37	Derick Silva; Brazil	10.45	Daniel Londero; Argentina	10.70
200 metres	Derick Silva; Brazil	20.92	Compton Caesar; Guyana	21.45	Enzo Faulbaum; Chile	21.55
400 metres	Miguel Shepper; Suriname	47.90	Daniel Williams; Guyana	48.24	Mateo Pascual; Uruguay	48.30
800 metres	Jeferson dos Santos; Brazil	1:56.35	Samuel Lynch; Guyana	1:57.26	Anfernee Headecker; Guyana	1:57.87
1500 metres	Jeferson dos Santos; Brazil	4:00.95	José Zabala; Argentina	4:02.51	Anfernee Headecker; Guyana	4:02.81
5000 metres	Daniel do Nascimento; Brazil	14:53.71	Yuri Labra; Peru	14:54.24	Carlos Hernández; Colombia	14:56.33
10,000 metres	Daniel do Nascimento; Brazil	31:01.64	Yuri Labra; Peru	32:13.78	Omar Ramos; Peru	35:39.20
110 metres hurdles (99 cm) -1.9 m/s	Marcos Herrera; Ecuador	13.58	Vittor Souza; Brazil	13.87	Diego Vivas; Colombia	13.99
400 metres hurdles	Caio Giovani Martins; Brazil	54.78	Eher Ali Romana; Colombia	55.65	Terrence Fraser; Guyana	58.07
3000 m steeplechase	Walace Caldas; Brazil	9:26.40	Edwar Condori; Peru	9:33.20	Alexander Huanca; Peru	9:35.40
4 × 100 m relay	Brazil; Cleverson Pereira Junior; Gabriel Oliveira; Derick Silva; Vittor Souza	41.29	Guyana; Daniel Williams; Tyrell Peters; Ryan Bramble; Compton Caesar	41.30	Colombia; Juan David Moreno; Diego Vivas; Samuel Mauricio González; Yeimer Palacios	42.38
4 × 400 m relay	Colombia; Nicolás Salinas; Manuel Henao; Eher Ali Romana; Samuel Mauricio González	3:20.85	Suriname; Bargalvio Sallesman; Miguel Shepper; Astrando Piñas; Daniel Peng	3:33.91	Argentina; Lautaro Benitez; Valentin Della ? José Zabala	3:35.94
10,000 m track walk	Jhonatan Amores; Ecuador	45:34.90	César Herrera; Colombia	45:56.70	Matheus Correa; Brazil	46:12.50
High jump	Luan Barbosa de Souza; Brazil	1.95	Tortque Boyce; Guyana	1.90	Daniel Williams; Guyana	1.90
Long jump	José Luis Mandros; Peru	7.91	Yeimer Palacios; Colombia	7.69	Gabriel Oliveira; Brazil	7.62
Triple jump	Frixon Chila; Ecuador	15.76	Arnovis Dalmero; Colombia	15.64	Geiner Moreno; Colombia	14.95
Shot put (6 kg)	Saymon Hoffmann; Brazil	16.57	Claudio Romero; Chile	16.48	Luis Córdoba; Colombia	15.84
Discus throw (1.75 kg)	Saymon Hoffmann; Brazil	54.59	Wellinton da Cruz Filho; Brazil	53.91	Claudio Romero; Chile	52.23
Hammer throw (6 kg)	Alencar Pereira; Brazil	71.42	Roberto Montiel; Chile	66.31	Only 2 participants	
Javelin throw	Pedro Henrique Rodrigues; Brazil	69.71	Tramaine Beckles; Guyana	53.41	Timothy Sealey; Guyana	48.93
Decathlon (junior)	Ignacio Sánchez; Peru	5271	Dennies Roberts; Guyana	4936	Jordan de Souza; Brazil	3361
WR world record | AR area record | CR championship record | GR games record | NR national record | OR Olympic record | PB personal best | SB season best | WL world leading (in a given season)

=== Women ===
Event	Gold		Silver		Bronze	
100 metres -3.1 m/s	Lorraine Martins; Brazil	11.56	Onasha Rogers; Guyana	11.71	Kenisha Phillips; Guyana	11.78
200 metres -2.6 m/s	Lorraine Martins; Brazil	23.89	Romina Cifuentes; Ecuador	24.19	Kenisha Phillips; Guyana	24.26
400 metres	Tiffani Beatriz Marinho; Brazil	54.25	Avon Samuels; Guyana	55.45	Karen Segura; Colombia	57.56
800 metres	Johana Arrieta; Colombia	2:10.41	Joanna Archer; Guyana	2:19.43	Davinia Asantiba; Suriname	2:50.68
1500 metres	Pietra da Silva; Brazil	4:31.82	Jarly Marín; Colombia	4:33.83	Claudrice McKoy; Guyana	4:39.96
3000 metres	Micaela Levaggi; Argentina	9:58.15	Sheyla Eulogio; Peru	10:10.06	Lida Meneses; Peru	10:18.91
5000 metres	Virginia Huatarongo; Peru	18:18.10	Nicole Urra; Chile	18:20.60	Sheyla Eulogio; Peru	18:35.70
100 metres hurdles +0.6 m/s	Maribel Caicedo; Ecuador	14.32	Vitoria Sena Alves; Brazil	14.41	María Valentina Sánchez; Argentina	15.07
400 metres hurdles	Valeria Cabezas; Colombia	60.27	Marlene Ewellyn dos Santos; Brazil	61.24	Salome Navarro; Ecuador	63.73
3000 m steeplechase	Rina Cjuro; Peru	10:47.25	Erika Mariela Pilicita; Ecuador	10:48.63	Clara Macarena Baiocchi; Argentina	11:08.13
4 × 100 m relay	Ecuador; Salome Navarro; Romina Cifuentes; Katherin Chillambo; Maribel Caicedo	46.47	Colombia; Valeria Cabezas; Angélica Gamboa; Shary Vallecilla; María Fernanda Murillo	47.33	Guyana; Kenisha Phillips; Cassie Small; Avon Samuels; Onasha Rogers	47.43 NR
4 × 400 m relay	Guyana; Avon Samuels; Tandika Haynes; Kenisha Phillips; Joanna Archer	3:51.40	Colombia; Jarly Marín; Marisofia Pinilla; Angélica Gamboa; Johana Arrieta	3:52.14	Argentina; María Valentina Sánchez; Micaela Levaggi; Clara Macarena Baiocchi; Oriana Prieto	4:13.57
10,000 m track walk	María Montoya; Colombia	48:22.4	Evelyn Inga; Peru	48:33.1	Leyde Guerra; Peru	49:07.6
High jump	María Fernanda Murillo; Colombia	1.78	Roberta dos Santos; Brazil	1.75	Candy Toche; Peru	1.75
Long jump	Chantoba Bright; Guyana	6.30	Vitoria Sena Alves; Brazil	6.12	Ruth Sanmogan; Guyana	5.59
Triple jump	Mirieli Estaili Santos; Brazil	12.71	Monifah Djoe; Suriname	12.33	Chantoba Bright; Guyana	12.19
Shot put	Ailen Armada; Argentina	14.34	Ana Caroline da Silva; Brazil	13.92	Jelyza Pengel; Suriname	11.56
Discus throw	Ailen Armada; Argentina	47.43	Valquiria Meurer; Brazil	44.19	Dahiana López; Uruguay	40.74
Hammer throw	Mariana García; Chile	60.42	Ana Lays Bayer; Brazil	59.96	Araceli Nahuel; Argentina	53.24
Javelin throw	Juleisy Angulo; Ecuador	54.00	Fabielle Samira Ferreira; Brazil	51.74	Kimbily Hilliman; Guyana	19.82
WR world record | AR area record | CR championship record | GR games record | NR national record | OR Olympic record | PB personal best | SB season best | WL world leading (in a given season)

== Medal table ==
The host country is highlighted in lavender blue

Rank	Nation	Gold	Silver	Bronze	Total
1	Brazil (BRA)	18	11	3	32
2	Ecuador (ECU)	6	2	1	9
3	Colombia (COL)	5	7	6	18
4	Peru (PER)	4	5	6	15
5	Guyana (GUY)*	3	10	12	25
6	Argentina (ARG)	3	1	6	10
7	Chile (CHI)	1	3	2	6
8	Suriname (SUR)	1	2	2	5
9	Uruguay (URU)	0	0	2	2
Totals (9 entries)		41	41	40	122
