= 2015 European Athletics U23 Championships – Women's high jump =

The women's high jump event at the 2015 European Athletics U23 Championships was held in Tallinn, Estonia, at Kadriorg Stadium on 10 and 12 July.

== Medalists ==
Gold	Alessia Trost; Italy
Silver	Nafissatou Thiam; Belgium
Bronze	Iryna Herashchenko; Ukraine

== Results ==
=== Final ===
12 July

Rank	Name	Nationality	Attempts							Result	Notes
Rank	Name	Nationality	1.71	1.76	1.81	1.84	1.87	1.90	1.94	Result	Notes
1st place, gold medalist(s)	Alessia Trost	Italy	–	xo	o	o	xo	o	xxx	1.90	
2nd place, silver medalist(s)	Nafissatou Thiam	Belgium	–	–	o	o	o	xxx		1.87	
3rd place, bronze medalist(s)	Iryna Herashchenko	Ukraine	–	–	o	o	xxo	xxx		1.87	
4	Jossie Graumann	Germany	–	o	o	o	xxx			1.84	
5	Aneta Rydz	Poland	o	o	xo	xo	xxx			1.84	=SB
6	Desirée Rossit	Italy	o	o	xo	xxo	xxx			1.84	
7	Leontia Kallenou	Cyprus	–	o	o	xxx				1.81	
7	Yuliya Chumachenko	Ukraine	–	o	o	xxx				1.81	
9	Sini Lällä	Finland	o	xo	xo	xxx				1.81	
10	Gintarė Nesteckytė	Lithuania	o	o	xxo	xxx				1.81	
11	Imke Onnen	Germany	–	xo	xxx					1.76	
12	Mariya Kuchina	Russia	o	–	xxx					1.71	

=== Qualifications ===
10 July

Rank	Name	Nationality	Attempts					Result	Notes
Rank	Name	Nationality	1.65	1.70	1.75	1.79	1.82	Result	Notes
1	Imke Onnen	Germany	–	–	o	o	o	1.82	q
1	Alessia Trost	Italy	–	–	o	o	o	1.82	q
1	Nafissatou Thiam	Belgium	–	–	–	o	o	1.82	q
1	Mariya Kuchina	Russia	–	o	–	o	o	1.82	q
1	Iryna Herashchenko	Ukraine	–	–	–	o	o	1.82	q
6	Jossie Graumann	Germany	–	xo	o	o	o	1.82	q
7	Desirée Rossit	Italy	–	o	o	o	xo	1.82	q
7	Yuliya Chumachenko	Ukraine	–	–	o	o	xo	1.82	q
9	Leontia Kallenou	Cyprus	–	–	o	xxo	xo	1.82	q
10	Aneta Rydz	Poland	o	o	o	xo	xxo	1.82	q
11	Gintarė Nesteckytė	Lithuania	o	o	o	o	xxx	1.79	q
12	Sini Lällä	Finland	–	xxo	o	o	xxx	1.79	q
13	Alexandra Plaza	Germany	–	–	o	xo	xxx	1.79	
13	Oksana Krasnokutskaya	Russia	–	o	o	xo	xxx	1.79	
15	Dior Delophont	France	–	o	o	xxo	xxx	1.79	
16	Tatiána Goúsin	Greece	–	–	xo	xxo	xxx	1.79	
17	Lucija Zubčić	Croatia	o	o	o	xxx		1.75	SB
17	Sofia Linde	Sweden	o	o	o	xxx		1.75	
17	Irina Iliyeva	Russia	–	o	o	xxx		1.75	
17	Viivi Voutilainen	Finland	–	o	o	xxx		1.75	=SB
21	Vendela von Corswant	Sweden	xo	xxo	o	xxx		1.75	
22	Livia Odermatt	Switzerland	o	o	xo	xxx		1.75	
23	Anne Engen Andersen	Norway	o	o	xxo	xxx		1.75	
24	Heidi Erkinheimo	Finland	–	o	xxx			1.70	
24	Undine Dindune	Latvia	o	o	xxx			1.70	
26	Merli Ilves	Estonia	xo	xxo	xxx			1.70	SB

== Participation ==
According to an unofficial count, 26 athletes from 17 countries participated in the event.

- Belgium (1)
- Croatia (1)
- Cyprus (1)
- Estonia (1)
- Finland (3)
- France (1)
- Germany (3)
- Greece (1)
- Italy (2)
- Latvia (1)
- Lithuania (1)
- Norway (1)
- Poland (1)
- Russia (3)
- Sweden (2)
- Switzerland (1)
- Ukraine (2)
