= 2019 European Athletics U23 Championships – Women's high jump =

The women's high jump event at the 2019 European Athletics U23 Championships was held in Gävle, Sweden, at Gavlehof Stadium Park on 12 and 13 July.

== Medalists ==
Gold	Yuliya Levchenko; Ukraine
Silver	Christina Honsel; Germany
Bronze	Ella Junnila; Finland

== Results ==
=== Qualification ===
12 July

Qualification rule: 1.89 (Q) or the 12 best results (q) qualified for the final.

Rank	Group	Name	Nationality	1.68	1.73	1.78	Results	Notes
1	B	Louise Ekman	Sweden	o	o	o	1.78	q
1	A	Morgan Lake	Great Britain	-	-	o	1.78	q
1	A	Yuliya Levchenko	Ukraine	-	-	o	1.78	q
1	B	Claire Orcel	Belgium	-	o	o	1.78	q
1	A	Yelizaveta Simanovich	Belarus	-	o	o	1.78	q
1	B	Karyna Taranda	Belarus	-	-	o	1.78	q
7	A	Christina Honsel	Germany	-	xo	o	1.78	q
7	B	Ella Junnila	Finland	o	xo	o	1.78	q
9	B	Saleta Fernández	Spain	o	o	xo	1.78	q
9	B	Salome Lang	Switzerland	-	o	xo	1.78	q
9	A	Maja Nilsson	Sweden	o	o	xo	1.78	q
12	B	Paulina Borys	Poland	o	o	xxo	1.78	q
12	B	Bianca Salming	Sweden	-	o	xxo	1.78	q
14	B	Liliy Klintsova	Ukraine	-	o	xxx	1.73	
14	A	Lada Pejchalová	Czech Republic	o	o	xxx	1.73	
14	B	Leonie Reuter	Germany	o	o	xxx	1.73	
14	A	Manon Schoop	Netherlands	o	o	xxx	1.73	
18	A	Adina Ionela Amzucu	Romania	o	xo	xxx	1.73	
18	A	Maryia Zhodzik	Belarus	-	xo	xxx	1.73	
20	A	Luca Renner	Hungary	o	xxo	xxx	1.73	
20	B	Monika Zavilinská	Slovakia	o	xxo	xxx	1.73	=SB
22	B	Rikke Andersen	Denmark	o	xxx		1.68	
22	A	Kristína Bošková	Slovakia	o	xxx		1.68	
22	B	Merve Menekse	Turkey	o	xxx		1.68	
22	B	Haneen Nassar	Israel	o	xxx		1.68	
22	A	Buse Savaskan	Turkey	o	xxx		1.68	
27	B	Eleonora Dragieva	Bulgaria	xxo	xxx		1.68	
27	A	Déspina Maltabé	Greece	xxo	xxx		1.68	
27	A	Elodie Tshilumba	Luxembourg	xxo	xxx		1.68	
	A	Elina Kakko	Finland	xxx			NM	

=== Final ===
13 July

Rank	Name	Nationality	1.75	1.80	1.85	1.89	1.92	1.95	1.97	2.00	Result	Notes
1st place, gold medalist(s)	Yuliya Levchenko	Ukraine	–	o	o	o	o	o	o	xxx	1.97	
2nd place, silver medalist(s)	Christina Honsel	Germany	o	o	o	xxo	o	xxx			1.92	PB
3rd place, bronze medalist(s)	Ella Junnila	Finland	o	xxo	o	xo	o	xxx			1.92	
4	Karyna Taranda	Belarus	–	o	o	o	xo	xxx			1.92	
5	Claire Orcel	Belgium	–	o	o	xo	xxx				1.89	
6	Morgan Lake	Great Britain	–	o	o	xxx					1.85	
7	Maja Nilsson	Sweden	o	o	xo	xxx					1.85	
8	Saleta Fernández	Spain	o	o	xxx						1.80	
8	Bianca Salming	Sweden	o	o	xxx						1.80	
10	Paulina Borys	Poland	xo	o	xxx						1.80	
11	Salome Lang	Switzerland	–	xo	xxx						1.80	
11	Yelizaveta Simanovich	Belarus	o	xo	xxx						1.80	
13	Louise Ekman	Sweden	o	xxx							1.75	
