= Joana Herrmann =

German athlete

Personal information
- Born: 1 November 2005 (age 20)

Sport
- Sport: Athletics
- Event: High Jump

Achievements and titles
- Personal best(s): High jump: 1.91m (Bergen, 2025)
Medal record
Women's athletics
Representing Germany
European U23 Championships
Bronze medal – third place	2025 Bergen	High jump
European U20 Championships
Bronze medal – third place	2023 Jerusalem	High jump

Joana Herrmann (born 1 November 2005) is a German high jumper.

== Early and personal life ==
From Westphalia, she took part in Judo in her youth before focusing on athletics and after trying a few disciplines settled on the high jump. She has unusual small stature for a high-jumper but by 2019 was regularly jumping higher than her own height. Her brother Jonas has also competed in high jump, and she is from a sporting family with her parents having been active in football and competitive dancing. At the age of 15 years-old in 2020, she jumped 1.73 meters, placing her first in the German Athletics Association's yearly rankings for her age group.

== Career ==
She is member of SV Teuto Riesenbeck, and was a finalist at the 2022 European Athletics U18 Championships in Jerusalem, Israel, placing seventh overall with best jump of 1.79 metres.

She won the bronze medal behind Angelina Topić and Elisabeth Pihela at the 2023 European Athletics U20 Championships in Jerusalem, Israel, with a best jump of 1.86 metres.

In February 2024, she won the German U20 Indoor Championships in Dortmund. In July 2024, she jumped 1.84 metres to win the 2024 German U23 Championships in Mönchengladbach.

She jumped 1.84 metres to place fourth overall at the senior German Indoor Athletics Championships in February 2025 in Dortmund. On 1 June 2025, she jumped a personal best jump of 1.88 meters in Essen. She cleared a personal best 1.91 metres to win the bronze medal behind Angelina Topić and Engla Nilsson at the 2025 European Athletics U23 Championships in Bergen, Norway on 19 July 2025 and ahead of Cypriot jumper Styliana Ioannidou on countback.
