= 2021 European Athletics U23 Championships – Women's high jump =

Women's high jump at the 2021 European Athletics U23 Championships
- Venue: Kadriorg Stadium, Tallinn
- Dates: 8 and 10 July
- Competitors: 21 from 17 nations
- Winning mark: 2.00

Medalists
gold medal	Yaroslava Mahuchikh	Ukraine
silver medal	Maja Nilsson	Sweden
bronze medal	Lia Apostolovski	Slovenia

The women's high jump event at the 2021 European Athletics U23 Championships was held in Tallinn, Estonia, at Kadriorg Stadium on 8 and 10 July.

== Records ==
Prior to the competition, the records were as follows:

European U23 record	Stefka Kostadinova (BUL)	2.09	Rome, Italy	30 August 1987
Championship U23 record	Svetlana Lapina (RUS)	1.98	Gothenburg, Sweden	1 August 1999

== Results ==
=== Qualification ===
Qualification rule: 1.89 (Q) or the 12 best results (q) qualified for the final.

Rank	Group	Name	Nationality	1.68	1.73	1.78	1.82	Results	Notes
1	A	Lia Apostolovski	Slovenia	–	o	o	o	1.82	q
2	B	Maja Nilsson	Sweden	–	–	xo	o	1.82	q
3	B	Karyna Demidik	Belarus	–	–	o	xo	1.82	q
3	B	Lea Halmans	Germany	o	o	o	xo	1.82	q
3	A	Yaroslava Mahuchikh	Ukraine	–	–	–	xo	1.82	q
6	B	Jessica Kähärä	Finland	–	xo	o	xxo	1.82	q, =SB
7	B	Panagiota Dosi	Greece	–	o	o	xxx	1.78	q
7	A	Wiktoria Miąso	Poland	–	o	o	xxx	1.78	q
9	A	Despoina Maltampe	Greece	o	o	xo	xxx	1.78	q
10	A	Juliette Perez	France	x–	o	xo	xxx	1.78	q
11	B	Despoina Charalambous	Cyprus	o	o	xxo	xxx	1.78	q
11	A	Zita Goossens	Belgium	–	o	xxo	xxx	1.78	q
11	A	Bianca Stichling	Germany	o	o	xxo	xxx	1.78	q
14	A	Gintarė Tirevičiūtė	Lithuania	o	xo	xxo	xxx	1.78	
15	B	Lilian Turban	Estonia	o	xxo	xxo	xxx	1.78	
16	B	Rebecca Pavan	Italy	o	o	xxx		1.73	
16	B	Nora Tobar	Spain	o	o	xxx		1.73	
18	B	Sara Lučić	Bosnia and Herzegovina	xxo	xo	xxx		1.73	
19	A	Nicole Romani	Italy	o	xxo	xxx		1.73	
20	A	Konstantina-Argiro Koutsouki	Greece	xo	xxx			1.68	
	A	Buse Savaşkan	Turkey	–	xxx			NM	

=== Final ===
Rank	Name	Nationality	1.75	1.80	1.85	1.89	1.92	1.95	2.00	2.03	Result	Notes
1st place, gold medalist(s)	Yaroslava Mahuchikh	Ukraine	–	–	o	o	–	o	o	r	2.00	CR
2nd place, silver medalist(s)	Maja Nilsson	Sweden	–	o	xo	o	xxx				1.89	
3rd place, bronze medalist(s)	Lia Apostolovski	Slovenia	o	o	o	xo	xxx				1.89	=SB
4	Karyna Demidik	Belarus	–	xo	xo	xxo	xxx				1.89	
5	Zita Goossens	Belgium	o	o	xo	xxx					1.85	
5	Wiktoria Miąso	Poland	o	o	xo	xxx					1.85	=PB
7	Lea Halmans	Germany	xo	o	xo	xxx					1.85	
8	Bianca Stichling	Germany	o	o	xxx						1.80	
9	Despoina Charalambous	Cyprus	o	xo	xxx						1.80	
9	Despoina Maltampe	Greece	o	xo	xxx						1.80	
9	Juliette Perez	France	o	xo	xxx						1.80	
12	Panagiota Dosi	Greece	o	xxo	xxx						1.80	
	Jessica Kähärä	Finland	xxx								NM	
