= 2018 Hypo-Meeting =

44th annual Hypo-Meeting

- Venue: Mösle stadium
- Location: Götzis, Austria
- Dates: May 26–May 27
- Website: https://meeting-goetzis.at/en/

Champions
- Men: (Canada) Damian Warner (8795)
- Women: (Belgium) Nafissatou Thiam (6806)

The 44th edition of the annual Hypo-Meeting took place on May 26 and May 27, 2018 in Götzis, Austria. The track and field competition, featuring a men's decathlon and a women's heptathlon event is part of the 2018 IAAF Combined Events Challenge.

== Men's decathlon ==
=== Schedule ===
May 26
1. 100 m
2. Long Jump
3. Shot Put
4. High Jump
5. 400 m

May 27
6. 110 m hurdles
7. Discus Throw
8. Pole Vault
9. Javelin Throw
10. 1,500 m

=== Records ===
World Record	Ashton Eaton (USA)	9045	29 August, 2015	Beijing, China
Event Record	Roman Šebrle (CZE)	9026	27 May, 2001	Götzis, Austria

=== Results ===
The best mark recorded in each event is highlighted in yellow

Rank	Athlete	Decathlon										Points
Rank	Athlete	100	LJ	SP	HJ	400	110H	DT	PV	JT	1500	Points
1	Damian Warner (CAN)	10.31	7.81	14.83	2.03	47.72	13.56	47.32	4.80	61.94	4:26.59	8795
2	Maicel Uibo (EST)	11.04	7.57	14.78	2.12	50.32	14.66	46.58	5.30	61.75	4:27.54	8514
3	Pieter Braun (NED)	11.12	7.62	15.28	2.00	49.25	14.40	45.52	4.90	58.77	4:24.29	8342

== Women's heptathlon ==
=== Schedule ===
May 26
1. 100 m hurdles
2. High Jump
3. Shot Put
4. 200 m

May 27
5. Long Jump
6. Javelin Throw
7. 800 m

=== Records ===
World Record	Jackie Joyner-Kersee (USA)	7291	September 24, 1988	Seoul, South Korea
Event Record	Nafissatou Thiam (BEL)	7013	May 28, 2017	Götzis, Austria
