= María Fernanda Murillo =

Colombian high jumper (born 1999)

Personal information
- Full name: María Fernanda Murillo Duarte
- Born: 21 January 1999 (age 27)

Sport
- Sport: Athletics
- Events: 60 metres hurdles; 100 metres hurdles; High jump; Heptathlon; 4 × 100 metres relay
- Coached by: Regla Sandino

Achievements and titles
- Personal bests: 60 metres hurdles: 7.95 NR (2026); 100 metres hurdles: 12.64 NR (2026); High jump: 1.94 m NR (2019); Heptathlon: 6357 pts (2026); 4×100 metres: 45.68 (2025); 4×400 metres: 3:29.01 NR (2026)
Medal record
Representing Colombia
Women's athletics
Event	1st	2nd	3rd
World U20 Championships	0	0	1
Pan American Championships	1	0	0
Ibero-American Championships	1	0	0
CAC Games	1	1	1
South American Games	1	0	0
South American Championships	2	0	1
South American Indoor Championships	1	0	0
Bolivarian Games	1	0	1
Pan American U20 Championships	1	0	0
South American U23 Championships	1	0	1
Total	10	1	5
Pan American Championships
Gold medal – first place	2026 Medellín	Heptathlon
Ibero-American Championships
Gold medal – first place	2018 Trujillo	High jump
Central American and Caribbean Games
Gold medal – first place	2026 Santo Domingo	100 m hurdles
Silver medal – second place	2026 Santo Domingo	4×400 m relay
Bronze medal – third place	2018 Barranquilla	High jump
South American Games
Gold medal – first place	2018 Cochabamba	High jump
South American Championships
Gold medal – first place	2017 Asunción	High jump
Gold medal – first place	2019 Lima	High jump
Bronze medal – third place	2023 São Paulo	Heptathlon
South American Indoor Championships
Gold medal – first place	2026 Cochabamba	60 m hurdles
Bolivarian Games
Gold medal – first place	2017 Santa Marta	High jump
Bronze medal – third place	2022 Valledupar	High jump
World U20 Championships
Bronze medal – third place	2018 Tampere	High jump
Pan American U20 Championships
Gold medal – first place	2017 Trujillo	High jump
South American U23 Championships
Gold medal – first place	2018 Cuenca	High jump
Bronze medal – third place	2016 Lima	High jump
South American U20 Championships
Gold medal – first place	2017 Leonora	High jump
Silver medal – second place	2017 Leonora	4×100 m relay
South American U18 Championships
Gold medal – first place	2014 Cali	High jump
Gold medal – first place	2016 Concordia	High jump

María Fernanda Murillo Duarte (born 21 January 1999) is a Colombian athlete specialising in the high jump. She won a bronze medal at the 2018 World U20 Championships in addition to multiple medals at regional level.

Her personal best in the event is 1.94 metres set in Medellín in 2019.

== International competitions ==
Year	Competition	Venue	Position	Event	Notes
Representing Colombia
2014	South American U18 Championships	Cali, Colombia	1st	High jump	1.78 m
2015	World U18 Championships	Cali, Colombia	13th (q)	High jump	1.77 m
2016	World U20 Championships	Bydgoszcz, Poland	9th	High jump	1.83 m
2016	South American U23 Championships	Lima, Peru	3rd	High jump	1.76 m
2016	South American U18 Championships	Concordia, Argentina	1st	High jump	1.85 m
2017	South American U20 Championships	Leonora, Guyana	2nd	4 × 100 m relay	47.33 s
2017	South American U20 Championships	Leonora, Guyana	1st	High jump	1.78 m
2017	South American Championships	Asunción, Paraguay	1st	High jump	1.82 m
2017	Pan American U20 Championships	Trujillo, Peru	1st	High jump	1.85 m
2017	Bolivarian Games	Santa Marta, Colombia	1st	High jump	1.78 m
2018	South American Games	Cochabamba, Bolivia	1st	High jump	1.90 m GR, AU20R
2018	World U20 Championships	Tampere, Finland	3rd	High jump	1.90 m =AU20R
2018	Central American and Caribbean Games	Barranquilla, Colombia	3rd	High jump	1.86 m
2018	Ibero-American Championships	Trujillo, Peru	1st	High jump	1.84 m
2018	South American U23 Championships	Cuenca, Ecuador	1st	High jump	1.80 m
2019	South American Championships	Lima, Peru	1st	High jump	1.90 m
2019	Herculis	Fontvieille, Monaco	7th	High jump	1.85 m
2019	Pan American Games	Lima, Peru	9th	High jump	1.79 m
2019	World Championships	Doha, Qatar	24th (q)	High jump	1.85 m
2022	Bolivarian Games	Valledupar, Colombia	3rd	High jump	1.78 m
2023	South American Championships	São Paulo, Brazil	3rd	Heptathlon	5229 pts
2026	South American Indoor Championships	Cochabamba, Bolivia	1st	60 m hurdles	8.01 s CR, NR
2026	South American Indoor Championships	Cochabamba, Bolivia	—N/a	4 × 400 m relay	DQ
2026	World Indoor Championships	Toruń, Poland	12th (sf)	60 m hurdles	7.97 s
2026	Pan American Championships	Medellín, Colombia	1st	Heptathlon	6357 pts
2026	Central American and Caribbean Games	Santo Domingo, Dominican Republic	1st	100 m hurdles	12.64 s NR
2026	Central American and Caribbean Games	Santo Domingo, Dominican Republic	2nd	4 × 400 m relay	3:29.01 NR
