= 2015 World Youth Championships in Athletics – Girls' high jump =

Girls' high jump at the 2015 World Youth Championships in Athletics
- Venue: Estadio Olímpico Pascual Guerrero
- Dates: 15 and 17 July
- Competitors: 23 from 18 nations
- Winning height: 1.90

Medalists
gold medal	Michaela Hrubá	Czech Republic
silver medal	Ieva Turķe	Latvia
bronze medal	Lada Pejchalová	Czech Republic

The girls' high jump at the 2015 World Youth Championships in Athletics was held at the Estadio Olímpico Pascual Guerrero in Cali, Colombia on 15 and 17 July 2015.

== Records ==
Prior to the competition, the following records were as follows.

World Youth Best	Charmaine Weavers (RSA)	1.96	Bloemfontein, South Africa	4 April 1981
World Youth Best	Olga Turchak (URS)	1.96	Donetsk, Ukraine	7 September 1984
World Youth Best	Eleanor Patterson (AUS)	1.96	Townsville, Australia	7 December 2013
Championship Record	Iryna Kovalenko (UKR)	1.92	Sherbrooke, Canada	12 July 2003
World Youth Leading	Vashti Cunningham (USA)	1.94	Walnut, United States	18 April 2015

== Results ==
=== Qualification ===
With qualifying standard of 1.80 (Q) or at least the 12 best performers (q) advance to the final.

Rank	Group	Name	Nationality	1.59	1.64	1.69	1.73	1.77	1.80	Mark	Notes
1	A	Michaela Hrubá	Czech Republic	–	–	–	–	o	o	1.80	Q
1	A	Tatyana Ermachenkova	Russia	o	o	o	o	o	o	1.80	Q
3	B	Ieva Turķe	Latvia	o	o	o	o	o	xo	1.80	Q, PB
3	B	Lada Pejchalová	Czech Republic	–	o	o	o	o	xo	1.80	Q
5	B	Clare Gibson	Australia	–	o	o	o	o	xxo	1.80	Q, PB
6	A	Karla Terán	Mexico	o	o	xo	o	o	xxo	1.80	Q
7	B	Elodie Tshilumba	Luxembourg	–	–	o	o	o	xxx	1.77	q
7	B	Erica Marchetti	Italy	–	o	o	o	o	xxx	1.77	q
7	B	Paulina Borys	Poland	–	–	o	o	o	xxx	1.77	q
10	B	Adaora Chigbo	Great Britain	–	xo	o	xxo	o	xxx	1.77	q
11	A	Lara Omerzu	Slovenia	–	–	o	o	xo	xxx	1.77	q
12	A	Aleksandra Nowakowska	Poland	–	xo	xo	xxo	xo	xxx	1.77	q
13	A	Selina Schulenburg	Germany	–	o	o	xo	xxo	xxx	1.77	
13	B	María Fernanda Murillo	Colombia	–	–	xo	o	xxo	xxx	1.77	
15	A	Madison Yerigan	United States	–	o	o	o	xxx		1.73	
15	B	Déspina Maltabé	Greece	–	o	o	o	xxx		1.73	
17	A	Giorgia Niero	Italy	–	o	xo	o	xxx		1.73	
18	B	Mona Gottschämmer	Germany	–	o	xxo	o	xxx		1.73	
19	A	Liu Zixuan	China	o	o	o	xo	xxx		1.73	
20	A	Nina Luyer	Austria	o	o	xo	xo	xxx		1.73	
20	A	Virginia Martín	Spain	o	xo	o	xo	xxx		1.73	
22	B	Mikella Lefebvre-Oatis	Canada	–	xxo	xxo	xxo	xxx		1.73	
–	B	Alisa Presnyakova	Russia	r						DNS	

=== Final ===
Rank	Name	Nationality	1.65	1.70	1.75	1.79	1.82	1.85	1.90	1.94	Mark	Notes
1st place, gold medalist(s)	Michaela Hrubá	Czech Republic	–	–	–	o	o	xo	xo	xxx	1.90	
2nd place, silver medalist(s)	Ieva Turķe	Latvia	o	o	xo	xxo	xo	xxx			1.82	PB
3rd place, bronze medalist(s)	Lada Pejchalová	Czech Republic	o	o	o	o	xxo	xxx			1.82	
4	Aleksandra Nowakowska	Poland	o	o	o	xo	xxo	xxx			1.82	PB
5	Tatyana Ermachenkova	Russia	o	o	o	o	xxx				1.79	
6	Paulina Borys	Poland	–	o	o	xxx					1.75	
6	Adaora Chigbo	Great Britain	o	o	o	xxx					1.75	
8	Karla Terán	Mexico	o	xxo	o	xxx					1.75	
9	Lara Omerzu	Slovenia	–	o	xxo	xxx					1.75	
10	Erica Marchetti	Italy	xo	o	xxo	xxx					1.75	
10	Elodie Tshilumba	Luxembourg	–	xo	xxo	xxx					1.75	
–	Clare Gibson	Australia									DNS	
