= 2018 IAAF World U20 Championships – Women's high jump =

Women's high jump at the 2018 World U20 Championships
- Venue: Ratina Stadium
- Dates: 13 July (qualification); 15 July (final)
- Competitors: 22 from 20 nations
- Winning height: 1.92 m

Medalists
| gold medal | Karyna Demidik | Belarus |
| silver medal | Sommer Lecky | Ireland |
| bronze medal | María Fernanda Murillo | Colombia |

The women's high jump at the 2018 IAAF World U20 Championships was held at Ratina Stadium on 13 and 15 July.

== Records ==
Standing records prior to the 2018 IAAF World U20 Championships
| World U20 Record | Olga Turchak (URS) | 2.01 | Moscow, Soviet Union | 7 July 1986 |
| World U20 Record | Heike Balck (GDR) | 2.01 | Karl-Marx-Stadt, East Germany | 18 June 1989 |
| Championship Record | Alina Astafei (ROM) | 2.00 | Sudbury, Canada | 29 July 1988 |
| World U20 Leading | Yaroslava Mahuchikh (UKR) | 1.94 | Győr, Hungary | 8 July 2018 |

== Results ==
=== Qualification ===
The qualification round took place on 13 July, in two groups, both starting at 11:40. Athletes attaining a mark of at least 1.84 metres ( Q ) or at least the 12 best performers ( q ) qualified for the final.

| Rank | Group | Name | Nationality | 1.70 | 1.74 | 1.77 | 1.80 | 1.82 | 1.84 | Result | Note |
|---|---|---|---|---|---|---|---|---|---|---|---|
| 1 | A | Karyna Demidik | Belarus | – | o | o | o | o | o | 1.84 | Q |
| 1 | B | Urtė Baikštytė | Lithuania | o | o | o | o | o | o | 1.84 | Q, PB |
| 1 | B | Martyna Lewandowska | Poland | o | o | o | o | o | o | 1.84 | Q, SB |
| 1 | B | Sommer Lecky | Ireland | o | o | o | o | o | o | 1.84 | Q, SB |
| 5 | B | Lavinja Jürgens | Germany | o | o | o | xo | xo | o | 1.84 | Q, PB |
| 5 | A | Shelby Tyler | United States | o | o | xo | o | xo | o | 1.84 | Q |
| 7 | B | María Fernanda Murillo | Colombia | o | – | xxo | xo | o | o | 1.84 | Q |
| 8 | B | Maja Helena Nilsson | Sweden | – | o | o | o | o | xo | 1.84 | Q |
| 9 | A | Mariya Kochanova | Authorised Neutral Athletes | o | o | o | o | xo | xo | 1.84 | Q, PB |
| 10 | A | Isis Guerra | Cuba | o | o | xo | xxo | o | xo | 1.84 | Q |
| 11 | A | Abby Ward | Great Britain | o | o | o | xo | xxo | xxo | 1.84 | Q, SB |
| 12 | B | Lamara Distin | Jamaica | o | o | o | o | xo | xxx | 1.82 | q |
| 13 | B | Sanaa Barnes | United States | o | o | xo | xo | xo | xxx | 1.82 | |
| 14 | B | Rümeysa Ökdem | Turkey | xxo | xxo | xo | xo | xo | xxx | 1.82 | PB |
| 15 | A | Bianca Stichling | Germany | o | o | o | o | xxx | | 1.80 | |
| 16 | A | Zita Goossens | Belgium | o | o | xo | xo | xxx | | 1.80 | |
| 17 | B | Monika Zavilinská | Slovakia | o | o | o | xxo | xxx | | 1.80 | PB |
| 18 | A | Tsai Ching-jung | Chinese Taipei | xo | o | o | xxo | xxx | | 1.80 | |
| 19 | A | Sara Lučić | Bosnia and Herzegovina | o | xxo | o | xxx | | | 1.77 | |
| 20 | B | Maryam Abdulelah | Iraq | o | o | xo | xxx | | | 1.77 | |
| 21 | A | Lu Jiawen | China | o | xo | xo | xxx | | | 1.77 | |
| 22 | A | Sakari Famous | Bermuda | o | xxx | | | | | 1.70 | |

=== Final ===
The final was held on 15 July at 13:42.

| Rank | Name | Nationality | 1.75 | 1.80 | 1.84 | 1.87 | 1.90 | 1.92 | 1.95 | Mark | Notes |
|---|---|---|---|---|---|---|---|---|---|---|---|
| 1st place, gold medalist(s) | Karyna Demidik | Belarus | xo | o | o | o | o | xo | xxx | 1.92 | NU20R |
| 2nd place, silver medalist(s) | Sommer Lecky | Ireland | o | xo | o | xo | o | xxx | | 1.90 | NU20R |
| 3rd place, bronze medalist(s) | María Fernanda Murillo | Colombia | o | o | o | o | xo | xxx | | 1.90 | =AU20R |
| 4 | Isis Guerra | Cuba | o | o | o | o | xxx | | | 1.87 | PB |
| 5 | Mariya Kochanova | Authorised Neutral Athletes | o | o | xo | xo | xxx | | | 1.87 | PB |
| 6 | Urtė Baikštytė | Lithuania | o | xxo | o | xo | xxx | | | 1.87 | PB |
| 7 | Maja Helena Nilsson | Sweden | o | o | xo | xxo | xxx | | | 1.87 | |
| 8 | Lavinja Jürgens | Germany | o | o | o | xxx | | | | 1.84 | PB |
| 8 | Martyna Lewandowska | Poland | o | o | o | xxx | | | | 1.84 | SB |
| 10 | Abby Ward | Great Britain | o | o | xo | xxx | | | | 1.84 | SB |
| 11 | Shelby Tyler | United States | o | xo | xxx | | | | | 1.80 | |
| 12 | Lamara Distin | Jamaica | o | xxx | | | | | | 1.75 | |
