= 2019 World Athletics Championships – Women's high jump =

Women's high jump at the 2019 World Championships
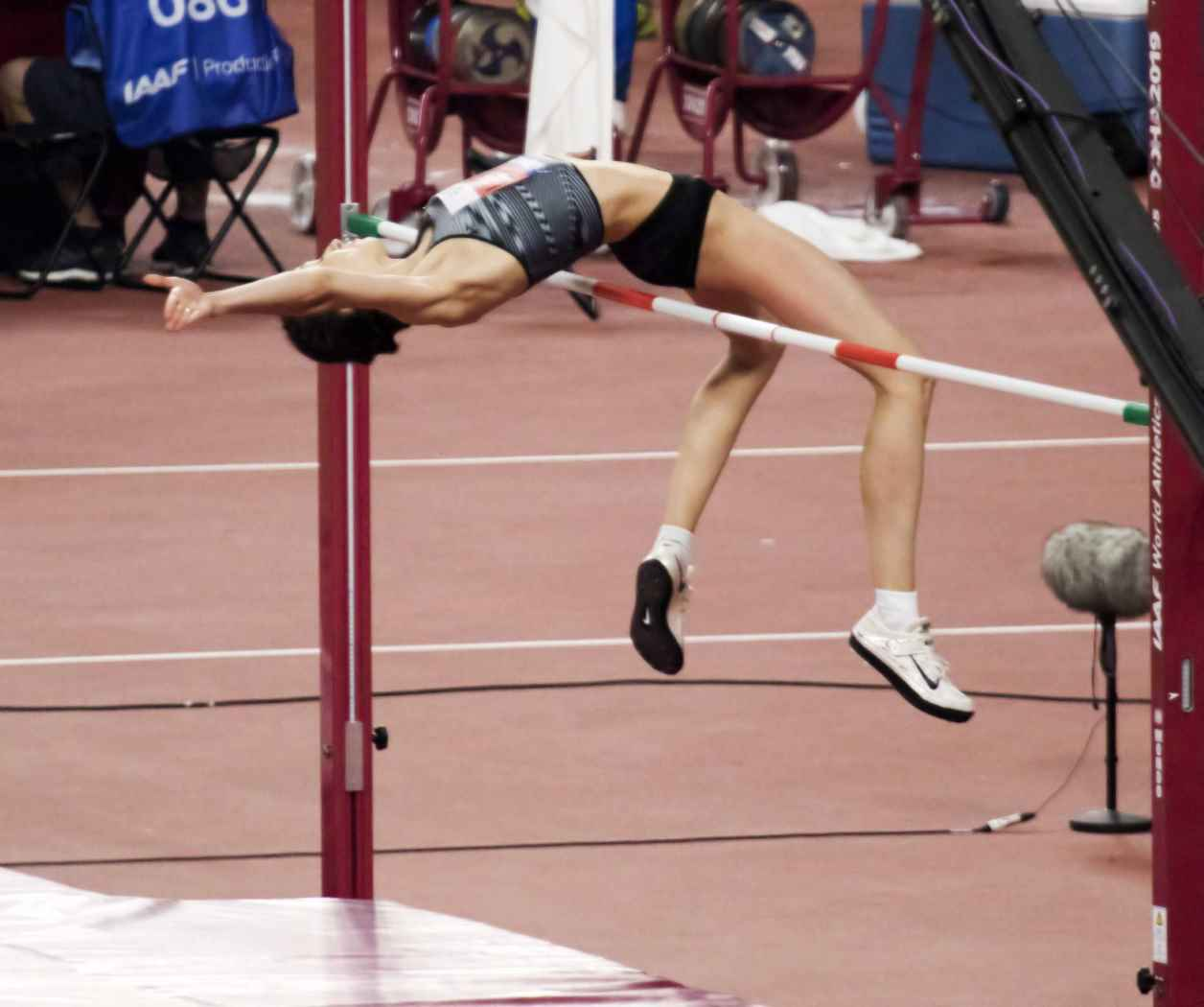
- Gold medalist Mariya Lasitskene
- Venue: Khalifa International Stadium
- Dates: 27 September (qualification); 30 September (final)
- Competitors: 30 from 22 nations
- Winning height: 2.04

Medalists
gold medal	Mariya Lasitskene; Authorised Neutral Athletes
silver medal	Yaroslava Mahuchikh; Ukraine
bronze medal	Vashti Cunningham; United States

Video on YouTube Official Video

The women's high jump at the 2019 World Athletics Championships was held at the Khalifa International Stadium in Doha, Qatar, from 27 to 30 September 2019.

== Summary ==
As might have been predictable, the six members of the female two metres club were the last six left in the competition at 2 metres. The newest member Karyna Demidik saved one attempt, but missed. First over was defending champion Mariya Lasitskene, who still had a clean round going. That was matched by Vashti Cunningham also maintaining a clean round. After two misses, returning silver medalist Yuliya Levchenko made it over. Returning bronze medalist Kamila Lićwinko was not so lucky and exited the competition. Next up newly tied U20 record holder Yaroslava Mahuchikh got over.

At 2.02m, Lasitskene continued her perfect series. Cunningham missed, and then Mahuchikh got over to set a new U20 record. Neither Levchenko or Cunningham could get over, leaving Cunningham with the bronze. At 2.04m, Lasitskene still remained perfect. After two misses, Mahuchikh got over again, setting a second new U20 record in the same competition; a 4 cm personal improvement. That was it, as Lasitskene had the advantage. Mahuchikh, with silver in her pocket, chose not to continue for a third personal best. Lasitskene took three failed attempts at 2.08m.

== Records ==
Before the competition records were as follows:

Record	Perf.	Athlete	Nat.	Date	Location
World	2.09	Stefka Kostadinova	BUL	30 Aug 1987	Rome, Italy
Championship	2.09	Stefka Kostadinova	BUL	30 Aug 1987	Rome, Italy
World leading	2.06	Mariya Lasitskene	ANA	20 Jun 2019	Ostrava, Czech Republic
African	2.06	Hestrie Cloete	RSA	31 Aug 2003	Paris, France
Asian	1.99	Marina Aitova	KAZ	13 Jul 2009	Athens, Greece
NACAC	2.05	Chaunté Howard Lowe	USA	26 Jun 2010	Des Moines, United States
South American	1.96	Solange Witteveen	ARG	8 Sep 1997	Oristano, Italy
European	2.09	Stefka Kostadinova	BUL	30 Aug 1987	Rome, Italy
Oceanian	1.98	Vanessa Browne-Ward	AUS	12 Feb 1989	Perth, Australia
Oceanian	1.98	Alison Inverarity	AUS	17 Jul 1994	Ingolstadt, Germany

== Schedule ==
The event schedule, in local time (UTC+3), was as follows:

Date	Time	Round
27 September	18:40	Qualification
30 September	20:30	Final

== Results ==
=== Qualification ===
Qualification: 1.94 m (Q) or at least 12 best performers (q).

Rank	Group	Name	Nationality	1.70	1.80	1.85	1.90	1.92	1.94	Mark	Notes
1	A	Vashti Cunningham	United States	–	–	o	o	o	o	1.94	Q
1	B	Karyna Demidik	Belarus	–	o	o	o	o	o	1.94	Q
3	A	Mariya Lasitskene	Authorised Neutral Athletes	–	–	o	xo	o	o	1.94	Q
4	A	Imke Onnen	Germany	–	o	o	o	xxo	o	1.94	Q
4	A	Yaroslava Mahuchikh	Ukraine	–	o	xo	o	xo	o	1.94	Q
6	A	Mirela Demireva	Bulgaria	–	–	o	o	xxo	xo	1.94	Q
7	B	Kamila Lićwinko	Poland	–	–	o	o	xo	xxo	1.94	Q
8	B	Svetlana Radzivil	Uzbekistan	–	o	xxo	o	xxo	xxo	1.94	Q, SB
9	B	Yuliya Levchenko	Ukraine	–	o	o	o	o	–	1.92	q
9	A	Tynita Butts	United States	–	o	o	o	o	xxx	1.92	q, PB
11	A	Claire Orcel	Belgium	–	o	o	xo	o	xxx	1.92	q
12	A	Ana Šimić	Croatia	–	o	o	o	xo	xxx	1.92	q
13	B	Levern Spencer	Saint Lucia	–	xo	o	xxo	xo	xxx	1.92	
14	A	Alessia Trost	Italy	–	o	o	o	xxo	xxx	1.92	
15	B	Nicola McDermott	Australia	–	o	o	o	xxx		1.90	
16	A	Maruša Černjul	Slovenia	–	xo	o	o	xxx		1.90	
17	B	Elena Vallortigara	Italy	o	o	o	xo	xxx		1.90	
18	B	Erika Kinsey	Sweden	–	o	o	xxx			1.85	
18	B	Inika McPherson	United States	–	–	o	xxx			1.85	
18	A	Marija Vuković	Montenegro	–	o	o	xxx			1.85	
18	A	Morgan Lake	Great Britain & N.I.	–	o	o	xxx			1.85	
22	B	Airinė Palšytė	Lithuania	–	xo	o	xxx			1.85	
23	B	Iryna Gerashchenko	Ukraine	–	o	xo	xxx			1.85	
24	B	María Fernanda Murillo	Colombia	–	o	xxo	xxx			1.85	
24	A	Daniela Stanciu	Romania	o	o	xxo	xxx			1.85	
26	A	Nadiya Dusanova	Uzbekistan	o	o	xxx				1.80	
27	B	Christina Honsel	Germany	o	xo	xxx				1.80	
28	B	Ella Junnila	Finland	xo	xo	xxx				1.80	
29	A	Alysha Burnett	Australia	xo	xxx					1.70	
29	B	Erika Seyama	Eswatini	xo	xxx					1.70	

=== Final ===
The final was started on 30 September at 20:30.

Rank	Name	Nationality	1.84	1.89	1.93	1.96	1.98	2.00	2.02	2.04	2.08	Mark	Notes
1st place, gold medalist(s)	Mariya Lasitskene	Authorised Neutral Athletes	o	o	o	o	o	o	o	o	xxx	2.04	
2nd place, silver medalist(s)	Yaroslava Mahuchikh	Ukraine	o	xo	o	xo	o	xxo	o	xxo	r	2.04	WJR
3rd place, bronze medalist(s)	Vashti Cunningham	United States	o	o	o	o	o	o	xxx			2.00	=PB
4	Yuliya Levchenko	Ukraine	o	o	o	o	o	xxo	xxx			2.00	
5	Kamila Lićwinko	Poland	xo	o	xo	xxo	xo	xxx				1.98	SB
6	Karyna Demidik	Belarus	o	o	o	xo	xx-	x				1.96	
7	Ana Šimić	Croatia	o	o	o	xxx						1.93	
8	Tynita Butts	United States	o	xxo	xo	xxx						1.93	PB
9	Imke Onnen	Germany	xo	o	xxx							1.89	
10	Mirela Demireva	Bulgaria	o	xo	xxx							1.89	
11	Claire Orcel	Belgium	o	xxo	xxx							1.89	
12	Svetlana Radzivil	Uzbekistan	xo	xxo	xxx							1.89	
