= Iryna Herashchenko (athlete) =

Ukrainian high jumper (born 1995)

- Iryna Herashchenko at the Wanda Diamond League’s 2026 Weltklasse Zürich.

Personal information
- Born: 10 March 1995 (age 31) Kyiv, Ukraine
- Height: 1.81 m (5 ft 11 in)
- Weight: 61 kg (134 lb)

Sport
- Country: Ukraine
- Sport: Athletics
- Event: High jump

Achievements and titles
- Personal bests: Outdoor: 2.00 m (2022); Indoor: 1.98 m (2021)
Medal record
Women's athletics
Representing Ukraine
Olympic Games
Bronze medal – third place	2024 Paris	High jump
Diamond League
Second place	2022	High jump
Third place	2024	High jump
European Championships
Bronze medal – third place	2024 Rome	High jump
European Indoor Championships
Silver medal – second place	2021 Toruń	High jump
Military World Games
Silver medal – second place	2015 Mungyeong	High jump
Bronze medal – third place	2019 Wuhan	High jump
Universiade
Silver medal – second place	2017 Taipei	High jump
Silver medal – second place	2019 Napels	High jump
European U23 Championships
Silver medal – second place	2017 Bydgoszcz	High jump
Bronze medal – third place	2015 Tallinn	High jump
European Junior Championships
Bronze medal – third place	2013 Rieti	High jump
World Youth Championships
Silver medal – second place	2011 Lille	High jump

Iryna Ihorivna Herashchenko (Ukrainian: Ірина Ігорівна Геращенко, born 10 March 1995) is a Ukrainian high jumper. She won the bronze medal at the 2024 Summer Olympics.

== Career ==
She competed at the 2016 Summer Olympics and 2020 Summer Olympics, finishing 10th and 4th respectively.

Herashchenko has a personal best of 2.00 m (outdoors) and 1.98 m (indoors).

She placed fifth at high jump at the 2026 European Championship in Birmingham.

== Achievements ==
Year	Competition	Venue	Position	Notes
2011	World Youth Championships	Lille, France	2nd	1.87 m
2012	World Junior Championships	Barcelona, Spain	7th	1.85 m
2013	European Indoor Championships	Gothenburg, Sweden	16th (q)	1.85 m
2013	European Junior Championships	Rieti, Italy	3rd	1.84 m
2014	World Indoor Championships	Sopot, Poland	10th (q)	1.92 m
2014	World Junior Championships	Eugene, United States	5th	1.85 m
2014	European Championships	Zürich, Switzerland	20th (q)	1.85 m
2015	European Indoor Championships	Prague, Czech Republic	10th (q)	1.91 m
2015	European U23 Championships	Tallinn, Estonia	3rd	1.87 m
2015	World Championships	Beijing, China	23rd (q)	1.85 m
2016	European Championships	Amsterdam, Netherlands	18th (q)	1.85 m
2016	Olympic Games	Rio de Janeiro, Brazil	10th	1.93 m
2017	European U23 Championships	Bydgoszcz, Poland	2nd	1.92 m
2017	World Championships	London, United Kingdom	13th (q)	1.89 m
2017	Universiade	Taipei, Chinese Taipei	2nd	1.91 m
2018	World Indoor Championships	Birmingham, United Kingdom	7th	1.84 m
2019	European Indoor Championships	Glasgow, United Kingdom	5th	1.94 m
2019	Universiade	Naples, Italy	2nd	1.91 m
2019	World Championships	Doha, Qatar	23rd (q)	1.85 m
2021	European Indoor Championships	Toruń, Poland	2nd	1.98 m
2021	Olympic Games	Tokyo, Japan	4th	1.98 m
2022	World Indoor Championships	Belgrade, Serbia	5th	1.92 m
2022	World Championships	Eugene, United States	4th	2.00 m
2022	European Championships	Munich, Germany	5th	1.93 m
2023	World Championships	Budapest, Hungary	5th	1.94 m
2024	European Championships	Rome, Italy	3rd	1.95 m
2024	Olympic Games	Paris, France	3rd	1.95 m
2024	Diamond League Final	Brussels, Belgium	3rd	1.92 m
2026	European Championships	Birmingham, United Kingdom	5th	1.92 m
2026	World Ultimate Championship	Budapest, Hungary	5th	1.91 m
