= Nafissatou Thiam =

Belgian athlete (born 1994)

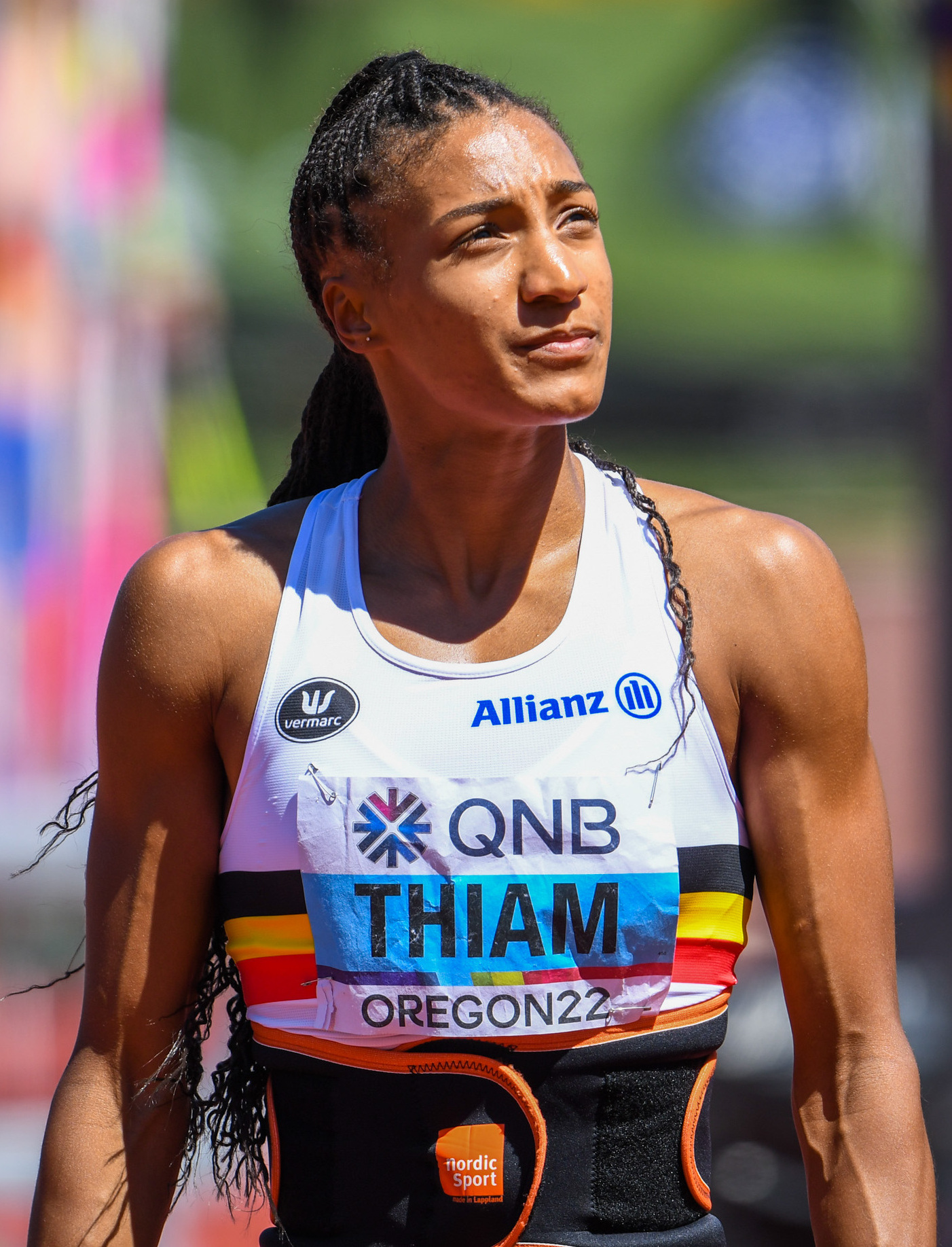
- Thiam at the 2022 World Athletics Championships in Eugene

Personal information
- Born: 19 August 1994 (age 32) Brussels, Belgium
- Height: 1.87 m (6 ft 2 in)
- Weight: 69 kg (152 lb)

Sport
- Country: Belgium
- Sport: Athletics
- Events: Heptathlon, Pentathlon
- Club: RFCL
- Coached by: Michael Van der Plaetsen (2022–); Roger Lespagnard (2008–2022)

Achievements and titles
- Highest world ranking: 1st (2023)
- Personal bests: Heptathlon: 7013 pts (4th of all time) NR (Götzis 2017); Pentathlon: 5055 pts WR (Istanbul 2023)
Medal record
Women's athletics
Representing Belgium
Event	1st	2nd	3rd
Olympic Games	3	0	0
World Championships	2	1	0
European Championships	3	0	1
European Indoor Championships	3	1	0
European U-23 Championships	0	1	0
European Jnr Championships	1	0	0
Total	12	3	1
Event	1st	2nd	3rd
Heptathlon	8	1	1
Pentathlon	3	1	0
High jump	0	1	0
Total	11	3	1
Olympic Games
Gold medal – first place	2016 Rio de Janeiro	Heptathlon
Gold medal – first place	2020 Tokyo	Heptathlon
Gold medal – first place	2024 Paris	Heptathlon
World Championships
Gold medal – first place	2017 London	Heptathlon
Gold medal – first place	2022 Eugene	Heptathlon
Silver medal – second place	2019 Doha	Heptathlon
European Championships
Gold medal – first place	2018 Berlin	Heptathlon
Gold medal – first place	2022 Munich	Heptathlon
Gold medal – first place	2024 Rome	Heptathlon
Bronze medal – third place	2014 Zürich	Heptathlon
European Indoor Championships
Gold medal – first place	2017 Belgrade	Pentathlon
Gold medal – first place	2021 Torun	Pentathlon
Gold medal – first place	2023 Istanbul	Pentathlon
Silver medal – second place	2015 Prague	Pentathlon
European U23 Championships
Silver medal – second place	2015 Tallinn	High Jump
European Junior Championships
Gold medal – first place	2013 Rieti	Heptathlon

Nafissatou "Nafi" Thiam (French pronunciation: [tjam] or; born 19 August 1994) is a Belgian athlete specialising in multi-event competition. She is the first athlete with three multi-event gold medals at the Olympic Games, winning the heptathlon at the 2016 Rio, 2020 Tokyo and 2024 Paris Olympics. Her three individual Olympic golds in a row for a woman equals the record of Anita Wlodarczyk of Poland in the hammer and Faith Kipyegon in the 1500 metres. Thiam is also the only Belgian athlete to successfully defend an Olympic title.

She won gold at the 2017 and 2022 World Championships, the 2018, 2022 and 2024 European Championships as well as the silver medal at the 2019 World Championships. Thiam was voted IAAF World Female Athlete of the Year in 2017. She was a Belgian flag bearer at the opening ceremony of the 2020 Tokyo Olympics.

In May 2017, at the Hypo-Meeting in Götzis, Austria, Thiam became only the fourth woman to break the heptathlon 7000-point barrier. In March 2023, at the European Indoor Championships, on her way to a record third European pentathlon title, she set a world record with a score of 5055 points. In doing so, Thiam became the first ever Belgian woman to set an official athletics world record.

As of March 2023, Thiam holds the Belgian records in the heptathlon and pentathlon, javelin and long jump (out and indoors). She holds the world record for the high jump discipline within the heptathlon competition, set in 2019.

== Career ==
=== Junior career ===
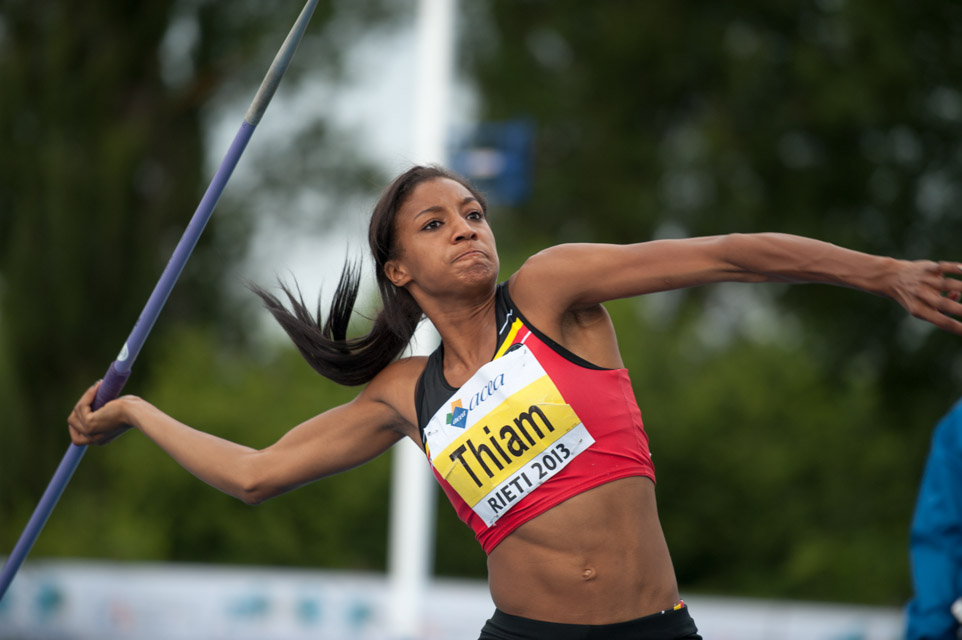
Thiam at the 2013 European Junior Championships held in Rieti, Italy

Nafissatou Thiam was born in Brussels to a Belgian mother and a Senegalese father. She started participating in athletics when she was seven years old, winning her first national age group titles in 2009, by which time she was already specializing in the heptathlon. Her favorite athlete at the time was Swedish heptathlete Carolina Klüft.

At the 2011 World Youth Championships in Athletics in Lille, France, Thiam finished fourth in the heptathlon with a total of 5366 points. Then, as a first-year junior, she finished 14th at the 2012 World Junior Championships in Athletics in the heptathlon with a total of 5384 points.

On 3 February 2013, Thiam broke the junior world indoor record in the pentathlon at a meeting in Ghent with a total of 4558 points, breaking her personal best in four of the five events. Carolina Klüft, who later became Olympic champion and triple world champion, had held the record since 2002 with 4535 points. In doing so Thiam became the first Belgian female athlete to break a world record. However, in March 2013, the record was not ratified due to a lack of anti-doping control on the day it was achieved. The testing took place the next day, which was beyond the deadline specified by the IAAF, athletics' international governing body.

On 18 July 2013, she won the gold medal in the heptathlon at the European Junior Championships in Rieti, Italy achieving a new Belgian record of 6298 points.

=== Senior career ===
In 2014, Thiam won the bronze medal for the heptathlon at the European Athletics Championships staged in Zürich, Switzerland.

In 2015, she won the silver medal in the pentathlon at the European Indoor Championships held in Prague and also claimed silver in the high jump at the European Under-23 Championships in Tallinn, Estonia.

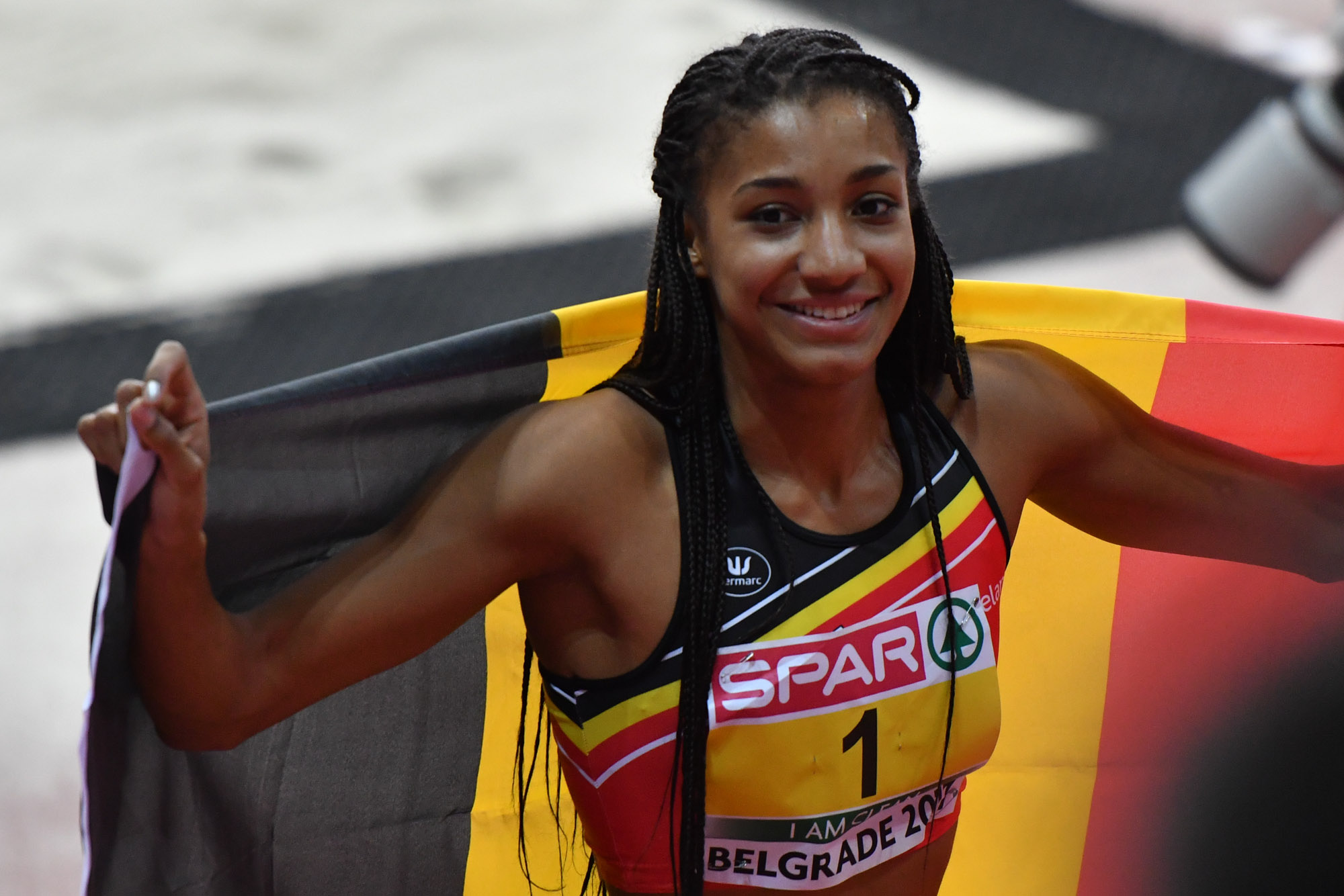
Nafi Thiam at the 2017 European Indoor Championships staged in Belgrade, Serbia

On 13 August 2016, Thiam won the gold medal for the heptathlon at the Olympic Games in Rio de Janeiro with a score of 6810 points, achieving personal best marks in five of the seven disciplines and defeating reigning Olympic and world champion Jessica Ennis-Hill of Great Britain. At 21-years-old, she was the youngest Olympic heptathlon gold medalist in history. She was elected Belgian flag bearer at the Olympic closing ceremony.

On 3 March 2017, Thiam won the pentathlon at the 2017 European Indoor Championships in Belgrade with a total of 4870 points.

On 28 May 2017, she won the heptathlon at the Hypo-Meeting in Götzis, Austria with a score of 7013 points, again achieving personal best scores in five of the seven disciplines, making her the fourth woman to score 7000 points or higher in competition. As of July 2017, she was third on the world all-time list behind Jackie Joyner-Kersee of USA and Sweden's Carolina Klüft. Her 59.32m javelin throw in Götzis broke the Belgian record for the women's individual event.

On 6 August 2017, Thiam went into the World Championships in Athletics in London as hot favorite and won the heptathlon world title, becoming the first Belgian to win a World Athletics Championship gold medal.

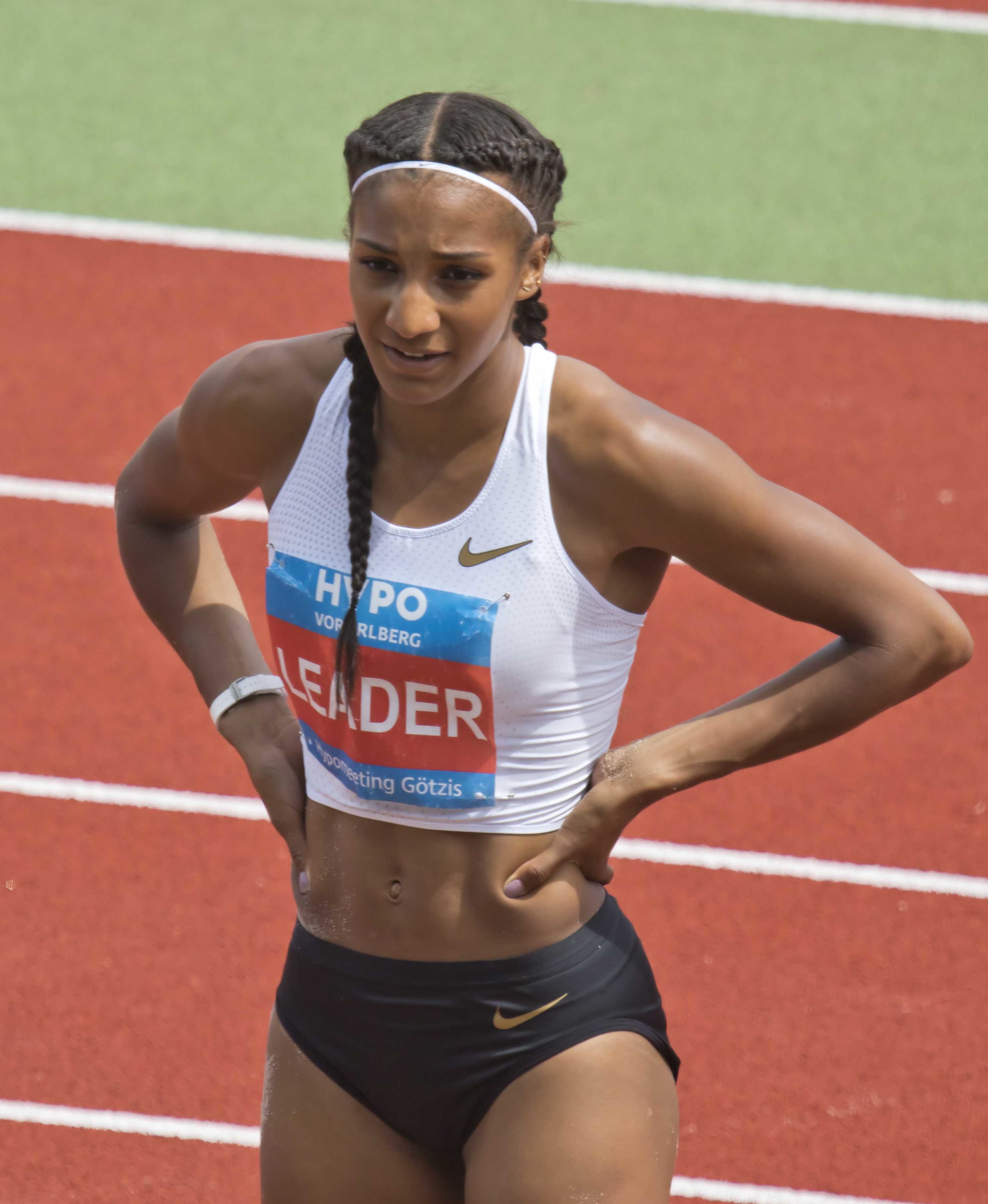
Nafi at the 2018 Hypo-Meeting in Götzis, Austria

On 10 August 2018, she won the gold medal at the European Athletics Championships, becoming only the third woman to win Olympic Games, World and European Championships in the heptathlon, after Carolina Klüft and Jessica Ennis-Hill.

On 27 June 2019, Thiam won the heptathlon competition at the Décastar meeting held in Talence, France setting a women's heptathlon high jump world record of 2.02 m (6 ft 7 1/2 in).

On 2 October 2019, she went again into the World Athletics Championships as world leader and favourite for gold, but was expected to face stronger competition than in 2017 from erstwhile rival and 2018 European runner-up, Great Britain's Katarina Johnson-Thompson. In the event, Thiam succumbed to an elbow injury that hindered her javelin, while Johnson-Thompson recorded a huge personal best of 6981 points, a national record and the sixth highest competition score in history to win comfortably. Thiam's performance was still good enough for the silver medal.

On 5 March 2021, she won the pentathlon at the European Indoor Championships in Toruń, Poland with a total of 4904 points.

On 5 August 2021, at the postponed 2020 Tokyo Games, she successfully defended her Olympic title with a score of 6791 points.

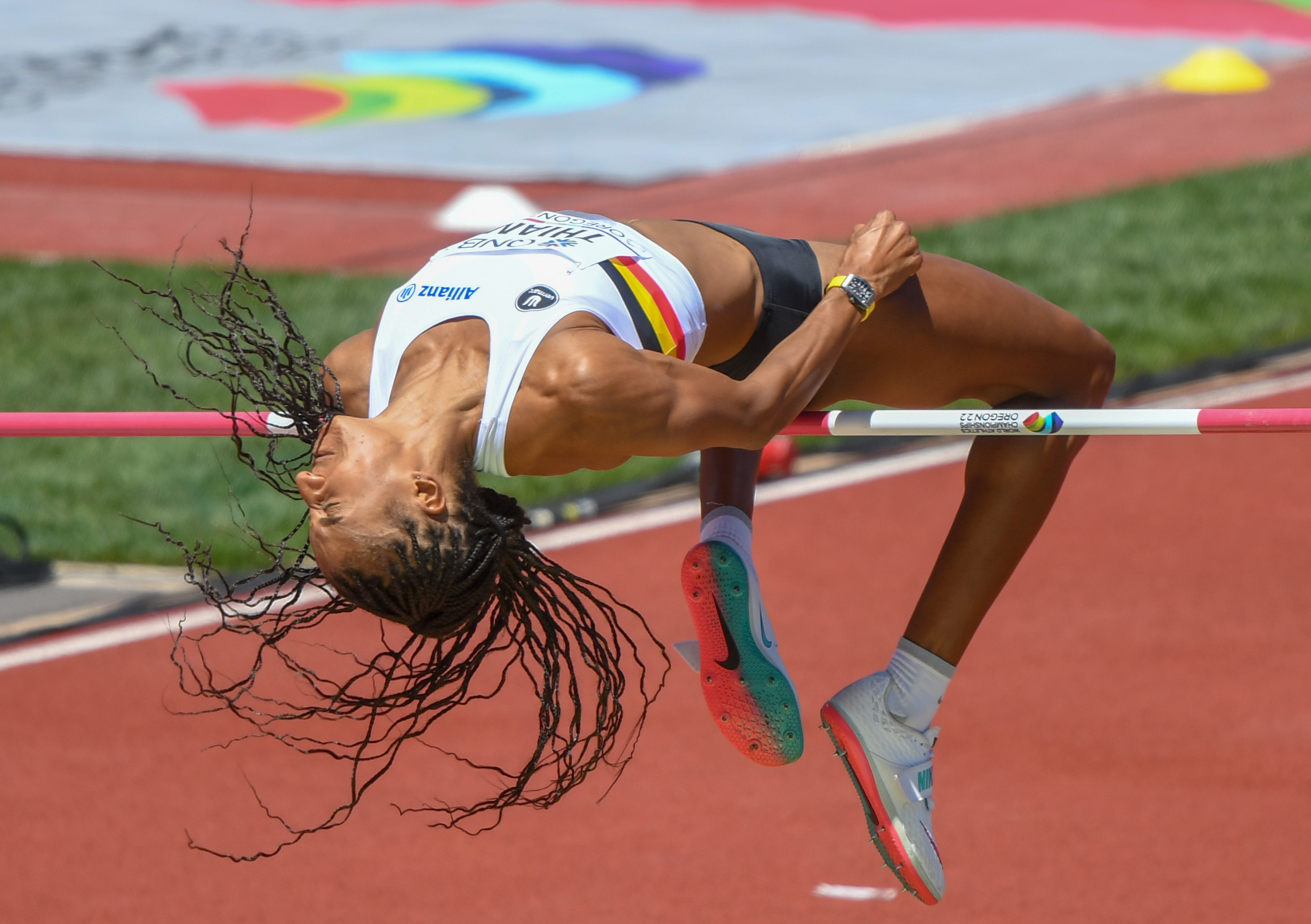
Thiam jumps over the bar at the 2022 World Athletics Championships in Eugene, Oregon

At the 2022 World Athletics Championships held in Eugene, Oregon, Thiam claimed her second world gold medal on 18 July with a total of 6947 points.

On 3 March 2023, at the European Indoor Championships in Istanbul, she broke the pentathlon world record set in the same Ataköy Arena back in 2012 by Ukraine's Nataliya Dobrynska (5013 points), totalling a score of 5055 points. With her third European indoor title, Thiam became the most successful female pentathlete in history of this championships. Injury, however, thwarted her capacity to defend her World Championships title, and in her absence Johnson-Thompson won her own second World title.

At the 2024 Paris Olympic game, for the first time in several years both Thiam and Johnson-Thompson reached the start line fit and healthy. Over the course of the two days, Thiam overcame an average high jump performance to retain once more her Olympic heptathlon title in a close contest, finishing 40 points ahead of her long-time rival who took silver. In doing so, she became the first athlete to win 3 consecutive Olympic gold medals in heptathlon.

== Training and personal life ==
Thiam is a member of RFCL Athlétisme, an athletics club operating under the aegis of the Technical and Sports Department of the Royal Football Club de Liège. She was coached by Belgian former decathlete Roger Lespagnard for 14 years but she put an end to their collaboration in October 2022.

Besides being a professional athlete, Thiam studied geography at the University of Liège. "I like climatology, I like geomorphology – how the earth is shaped by rivers. A lot of subjects, like a heptathlon. Maybe that's why I love it." she said. She graduated from university with a bachelor's degree in September 2019.

Thiam is a UNICEF Goodwill Ambassador for UNICEF Belgium.

== Achievements ==
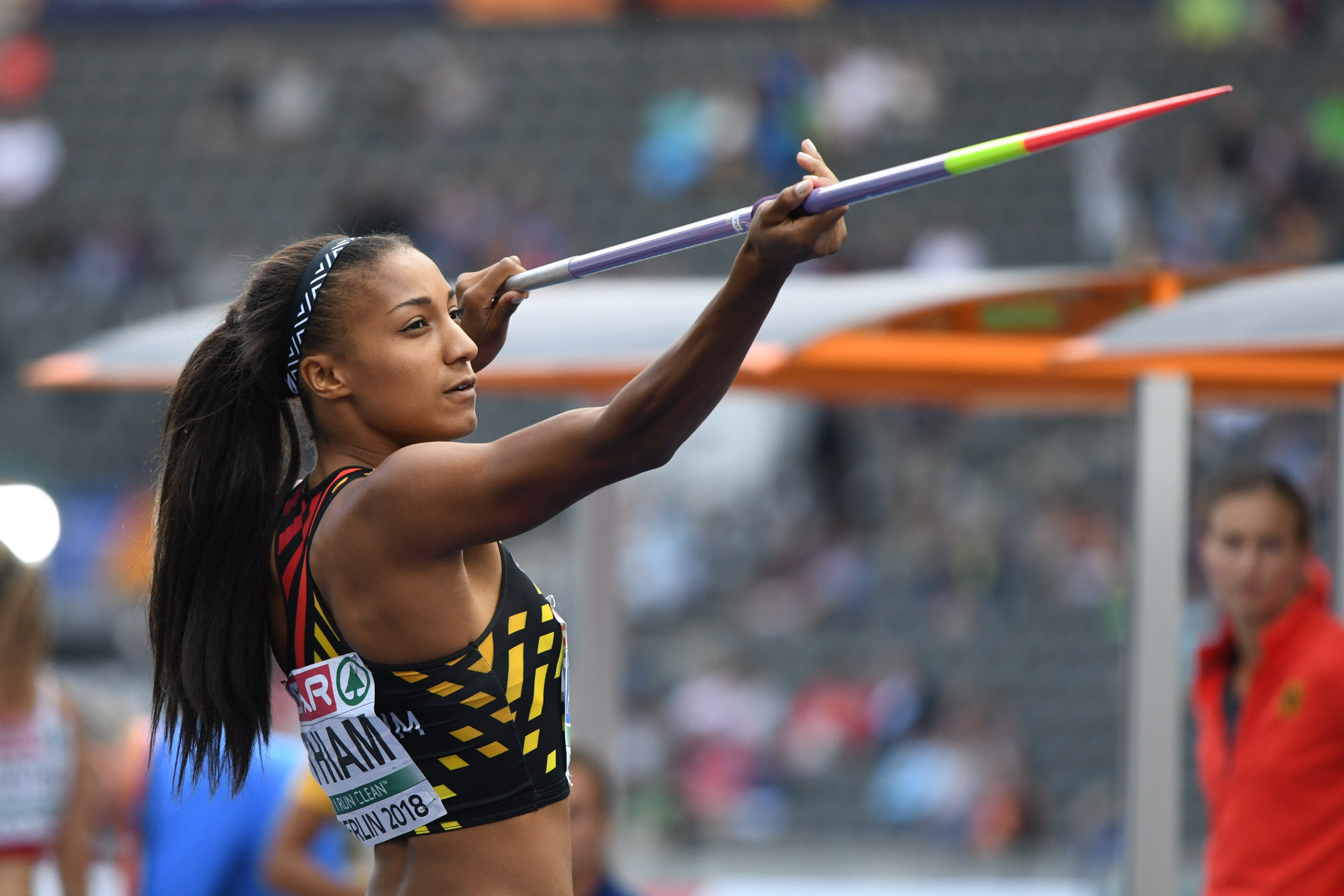
Thiam with javelin at the 2018 European Championships in Berlin

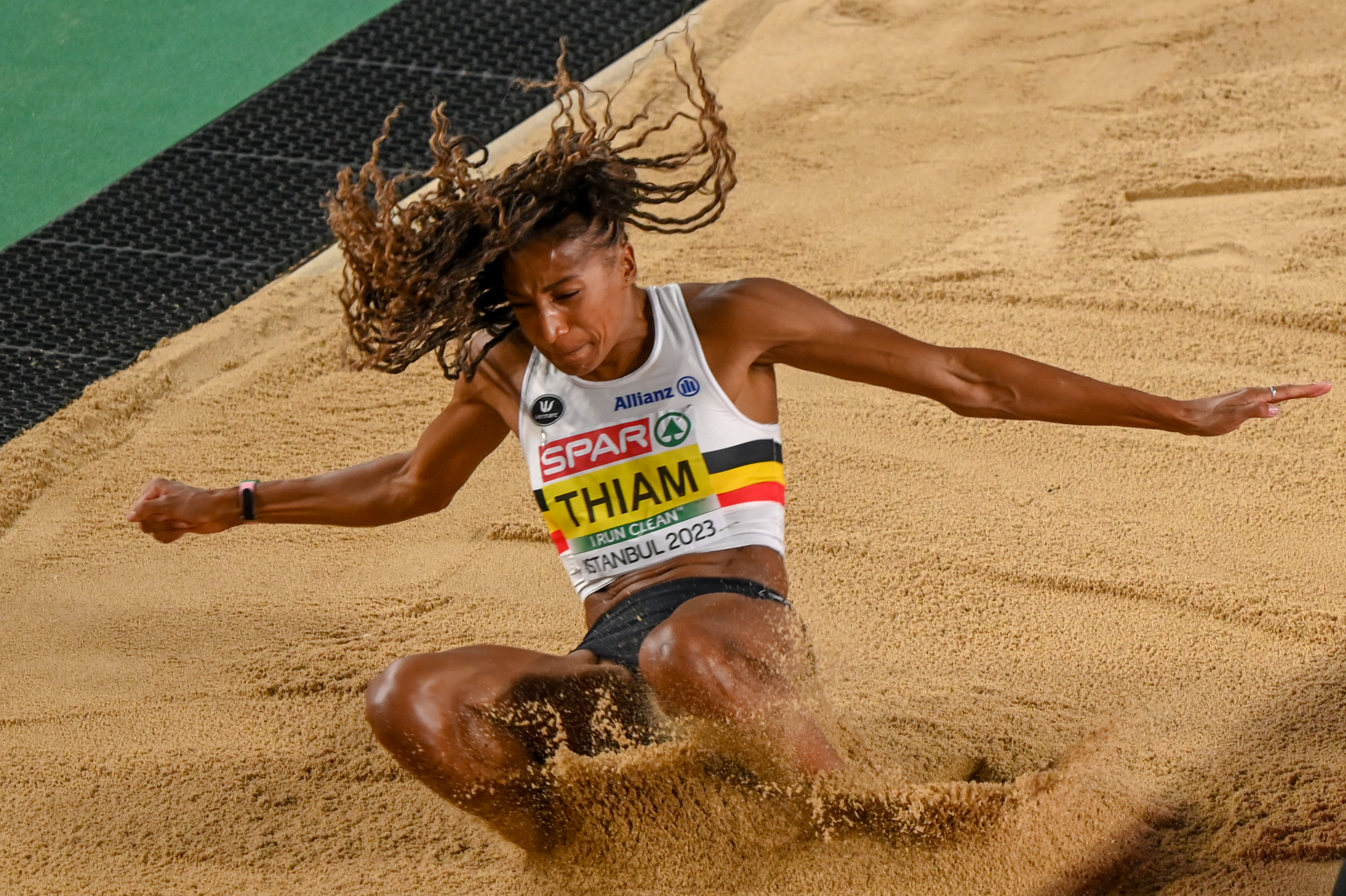
Thiam lands a long jump at the 2023 European Indoor Championships in Istanbul

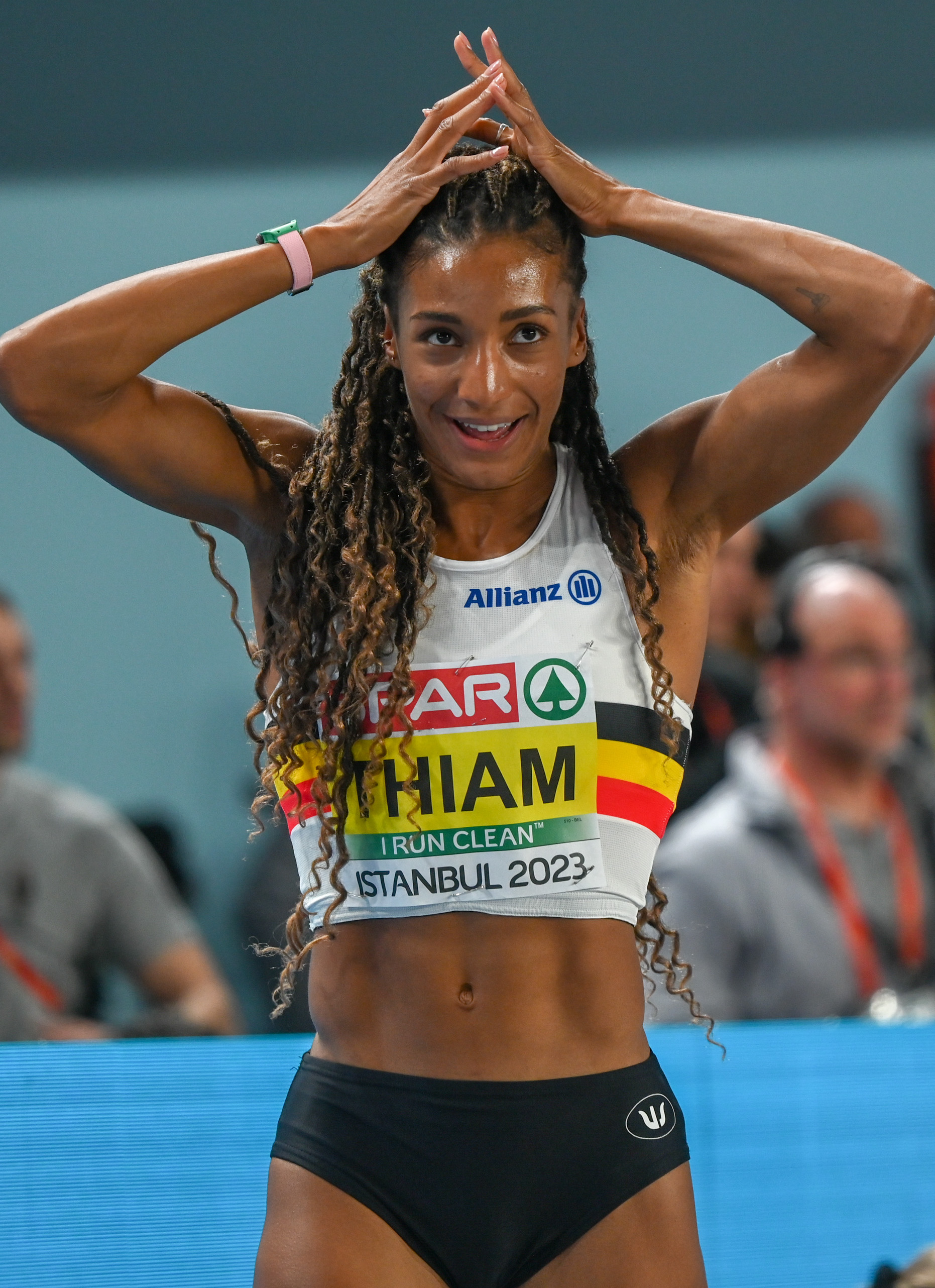
Thiam after setting a pentathlon world record with a score of 5055 points at the 2023 European Indoor Championships in Istanbul

All information from World Athletics profile unless otherwise noted.

=== International competitions ===
Representing Belgium
Year	Competition	Venue	Position	Event	Result	Notes
2011	World Youth Championships	Villeneuve-d'Ascq, France	4th	Heptathlon	5366 pts	
2011	European Youth Olympic Festival	Trabzon, Turkey	9th (q2)	Long jump	5.50 m	
2011	European Youth Olympic Festival	Trabzon, Turkey	11th	Javelin throw	40.62 m (45.60 q)	
2012	World Junior Championships	Barcelona, Spain	14th	Heptathlon	5384 pts	
2013	European Indoor Championships	Gothenburg, Sweden	6th	Pentathlon	4493 pts	
2013	European Team Championships First League	Dublin, Ireland	1st	High jump	1.89 m	
2013	European Team Championships First League	Dublin, Ireland	12th	Javelin throw	40.72 m	
2013	European Junior Championships	Rieti, Italy	1st	Heptathlon	6298 pts	NR
2013	World Championships	Moscow, Russia	14th	Heptathlon	6070 pts	
2013	Jeux de la Francophonie	Nice, France	4th	High jump	1.83 m	
2014	World Indoor Championships	Sopot, Poland	8th	High jump	1.90 m	
2014	European Championships	Zürich, Switzerland	3rd	Heptathlon	6423 pts	
2015	European Indoor Championships	Prague, Czech Republic	2nd	Pentathlon	4696 pts	PB
2015	European U23 Championships	Tallinn, Estonia	2nd	High jump	1.87 m	
2015	World Championships	Beijing, China	11th	Heptathlon	6298 pts	
2016	European Championships	Amsterdam, Netherlands	4th	High jump	1.93 m	
2016	Olympic Games	Rio de Janeiro, Brazil	–	High jump	DNS	
2016	Olympic Games	Rio de Janeiro, Brazil	1st	Heptathlon	6810 pts	WL NR
2017	European Indoor Championships	Belgrade, Serbia	1st	Pentathlon	4870 pts	WL
2017	World Championships	London, United Kingdom	1st	Heptathlon	6784 pts	
2018	European Championships	Berlin, Germany	1st	Heptathlon	6816 pts	WL
2019	World Championships	Doha, Qatar	2nd	Heptathlon	6677 pts	
2021	European Indoor Championships	Toruń, Poland	1st	Pentathlon	4904 pts	WL NR
2021	Olympic Games	Tokyo, Japan	1st	Heptathlon	6791 pts	SB
2022	World Championships	Eugene, United States	1st	Heptathlon	6947 pts	WL
2022	European Championships	Munich, Germany	1st	Heptathlon	6628 pts	
2023	European Indoor Championships	Istanbul, Turkey	1st	Pentathlon	5055 pts	WR
2024	European Championships	Rome, Italy	1st	Heptathlon	6848 pts	CHB
2024	Olympic Games	Paris, France	1st	Heptathlon	6880 pts	SB
2025	World Championships	Tokyo, Japan	–	Heptathlon	DNF	

=== Circuit wins ===
- Hypo-Meeting: 2017, 2018
- Décastar: 2019
- Diamond League
  - 2016: Brussels Memorial Van Damme (High jump)
  - 2018: Brussels (High jump)
  - 2019: Birmingham Grand Prix (Long jump, NR)

=== Personal bests ===
Outdoor
Event	Performance	Points	Venue	Date	Notes
100 m hurdles	13.21 s	1093	Eugene, OR, United States	17 July 2022	
High jump	2.02 m	1264	Talence, France	22 June 2019	WHB
Shot put	15.54 m	897	Paris, France	8 August 2024	
200 metres	24.37 s	945	Gaurain-Ramecroix, Belgium	18 May 2019	(Note: Mark set in separate competition outside of heptathlon. Heptathlon best: 24.39 s.)
Long jump	6.86 m	1125	Birmingham, United Kingdom	18 August 2019	NR (Note: Mark set in separate competition outside of heptathlon. Heptathlon best: 6.67 m.)
Javelin throw	59.32 m	1041	Götzis, Austria	28 May 2017	NR
800 metres	2:10.62 min	956	Paris, France	9 August 2024	
Heptathlon	7013 pts	PB total: 7321	Götzis, Austria	28 May 2017	NR, 4th of all time

Indoor
Event	Performance	Points	Venue	Date	Notes
60 m hurdles	8.23 s	1077	Belgrade, Serbia	3 March 2017	
High jump	1.96 m	1184	Belgrade, Serbia	3 March 2017	
Shot put	15.54 m	897	Istanbul, Turkey	3 March 2023	
Long jump	6.79 m	1102	Liévin, France	1 March 2020	NR
800 metres	2:13.60 min	913	Istanbul, Turkey	3 March 2023	
Pentathlon	5055 pts	PB total: 5173	Istanbul, Turkey	3 March 2023	WR

=== National titles ===
- Belgian Athletics Championships
  - Long jump: 2015, 2018, 2022, 2025
  - Javelin Throw: 2023
- Belgian Indoor Athletics Championships
  - 60 m hurdles: 2017
  - High jump: 2015, 2017
  - Long jump: 2016
  - Pentathlon: 2016

== Honours and awards ==
- R.F.C.L. Trophy Promising talent: 2010
- Golden Spike best female talent: 2012
- Golden Spike award: 2013, 2014, 2015, 2016, 2017, 2018, 2019, 2021, 2022, 2024
- Belgian Promising Talent of the Year: 2013
- Belgian Sportswoman of the Year: 2014, 2016, 2017, 2022, 2024
- Knight in the Walloon Order of Merit: 2014
- European Athletics women's Rising Star of the Year: 2016
- IAAF Female Rising Star of the Year: 2016
- Belgian Sports Merit Award: 2016
- Commander in the Walloon Order of Merit: 2016
- Forbes 30 under 30 for Europe: 2017
- IAAF World Female Athlete of the Year: 2017
- Grand Officer in the Order of Leopold: 2023

In 2017, Thiam officially became UNICEF Ambassador.

In 2026, the Drève Nafissatou Thiam/Nafissatou Thiamdreef in the Heysel neighbourhood of Brussels, Belgium, was named in her honour.

Olympic Games
Preceded by Olivia Borlée	Flagbearer for Belgium (with Félix Denayer); Tokyo 2020	Succeeded by Incumbent
