= Imke Onnen =

German high jumper

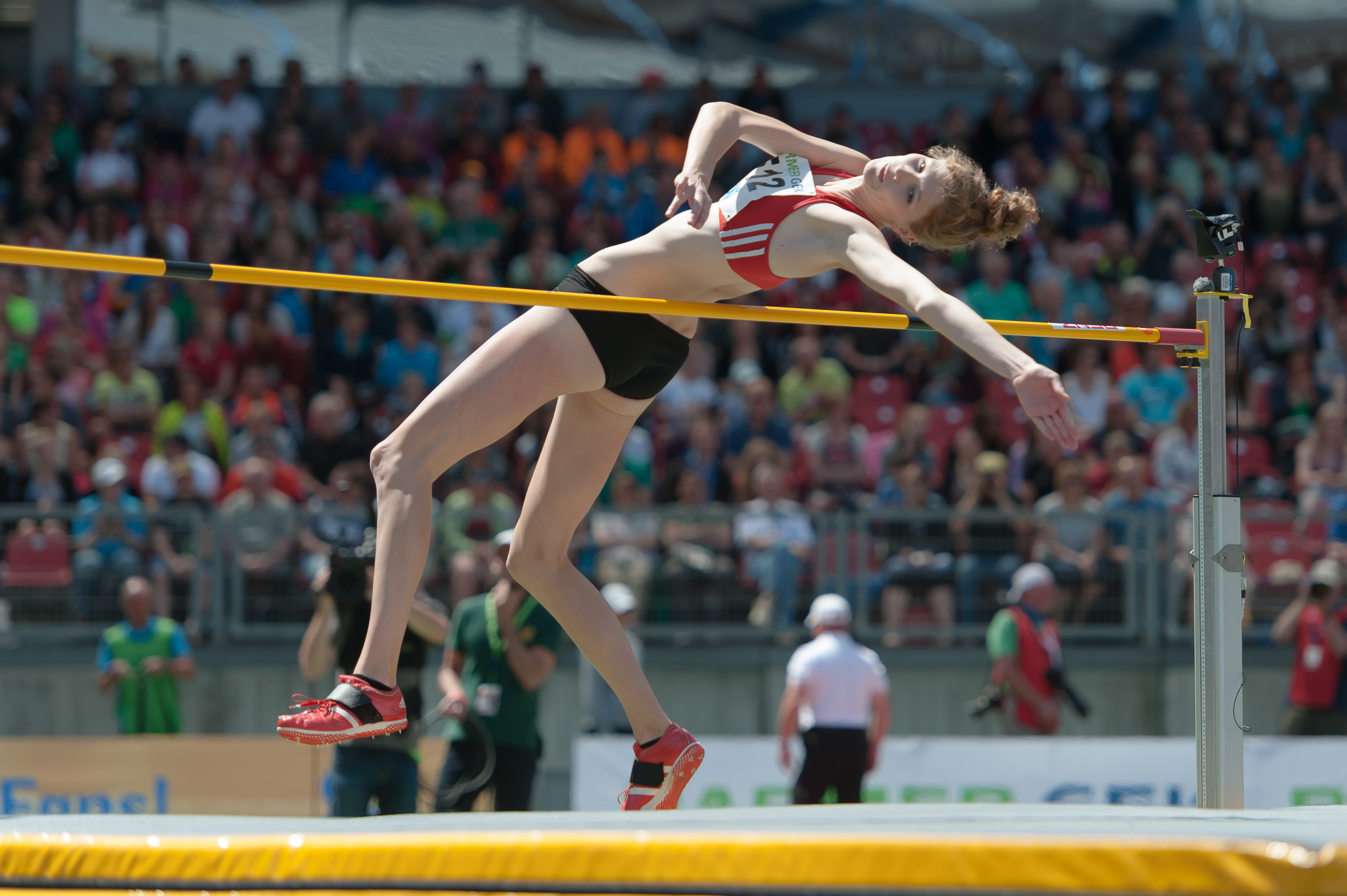
- Imke Onnen in 2015

Personal information
- Born: 17 August 1994 (age 31) Langenhagen, Germany
- Education: Technical University of Braunschweig
- Height: 1.91 m (6 ft 3 in)
- Weight: 66 kg (146 lb)

Sport
- Sport: Athletics
- Event: High jump
- Club: Cologne Athletics; LG Hannover/Hannover 96
- Coached by: Astrid Fredebold-Onnen

Imke Susann Onnen (born 17 August 1994) is a German athlete specialising in the high jump. She won a bronze medal at the 2019 Summer Universiade.

Her personal bests in the event are 1.94 metres outdoors (Göttingen 2019) and 1.96 metres indoors (Leipzig 2019).

She comes from a sporting family, her brother Eike also being a high jumper while mother Astrid Fredebold-Onnen a former heptathlete (as well as Imke's coach).

== International competitions ==
Year	Competition	Venue	Position	Notes
Representing Germany
2011	European Youth Olympic Festival	Trabzon, Turkey	15th (q)	1.70 m
2013	European Junior Championships	Rieti, Italy	19th (q)	1.70 m
2015	European U23 Championships	Tallinn, Estonia	11th	1.76 m
2018	European Championships	Berlin, Germany	14th	1.82 m
2019	European Indoor Championships	Birmingham, United Kingdom	7th	1.91 m
2019	Universiade	Naples, Italy	3rd	1.91 m
2019	World Championships	Doha, Qatar	9th	1.89 m
2021	Olympic Games	Tokyo, Japan	25th (q)	1.86 m
2024	European Championships	Rome, Italy	8th	1.90 m
2024	Olympic Games	Paris, France	14th (q)	1.92 m
2025	European Indoor Championships	Apeldoorn, Netherlands	6th	1.89 m
2025	World Indoor Championships	Nanjing, China	6th	1.92 m
2025	World Championships	Tokyo, Japan	11th	1.93 m
2026	World Indoor Championships	Toruń, Poland	8th	1.89 m
