= Karyna Demidik =

Belarusian high jumper (born 1999)

Personal information
- Full name: Karyna Alehauna Demidik
- Born: Karyna Alehauna Taranda; 10 February 1999 (age 27) Baranavichy, Brest Region, Belarus
- Education: Belarusian State University of Physical Training

Sport
- Sport: Athletics
- Event: High jump

Karyna Alehauna Demidik, née Taranda (Belarusian: Кары́на Але́гаўна Дзямідзік (Таранда); born on 10 February 1999) is a Belarusian athlete specialising in the high jump. She won a silver medal at the 2017 European U20 Championships and a gold at the 2018 World U20 Championships.

Her personal bests in the event are 2.00 metres outdoors (Lausanne 2019), tying the Belarusian national record, and 1.94 metres indoors (Brno 2019).

== International competitions ==
Year	Competition	Venue	Position	Notes
Representing Belarus
2016	European Youth Championships	Tbilisi, Georgia	16th (q)	1.75 m
2017	European U20 Championships	Grosseto, Italy	2nd	1.87 m
2018	World U20 Championships	Tampere, Finland	1st	1.92 m
2018	European Championships	Berlin, Germany	12th	1.87 m
2019	European Indoor Championships	Glasgow, United Kingdom	12th	1.87 m
2019	European U23 Championships	Gävle, Sweden	4th	1.92 m
2019	World Championships	Doha, Qatar	6th	1.96 m
2021	European Indoor Championships	Toruń, Poland	9th (q)	1.87 m
2021	Olympic Games	Tokyo, Japan	19th (q)	1.90 m
