= Lia Apostolovski =

Slovenian athlete (born 2000)

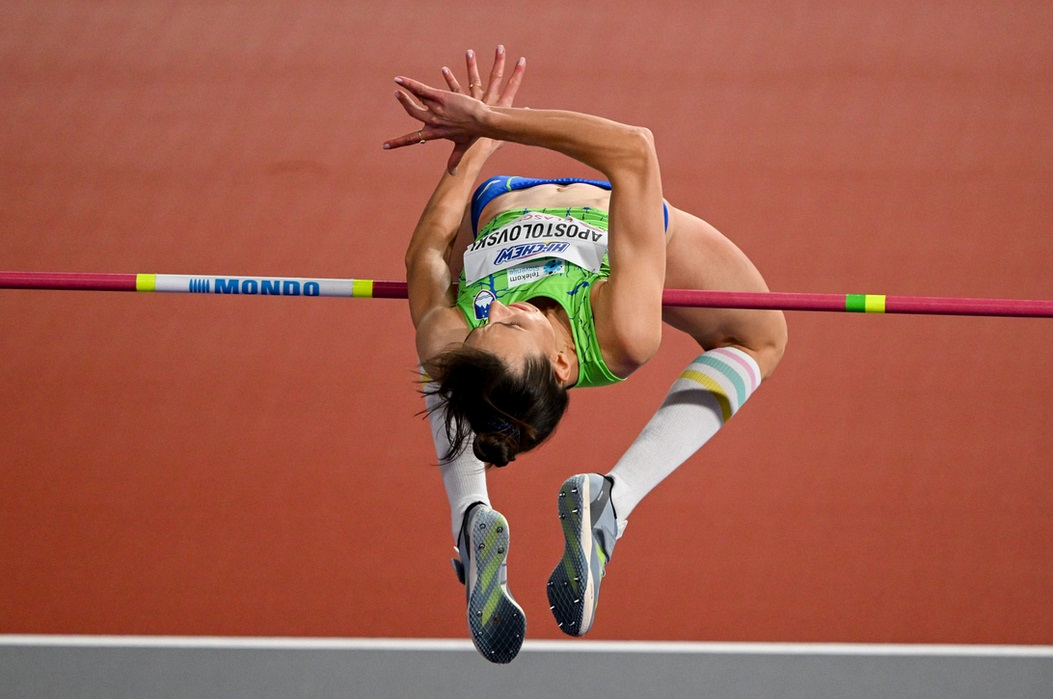
- Apostolovski at the 2024 World Athletics Indoor Championships

Personal information
- Nationality: Slovenia
- Born: 23 June 2000 (age 26) Ljubljana, Slovenia

Sport
- Sport: Athletics
- Event: High Jump

Achievements and titles
- Personal best: High jump: 1.95m (2023)
Medal record
Women's athletics
Representing Slovenia
World Indoor Championships
Bronze medal – third place	2024 Glasgow	High jump
European U23 Championships
Bronze medal – third place	2021 Tallinn	High jump

Lia Apostolovski (born 23 June 2000) is a Slovenian track and field high jumper. She was the bronze medalist at the 2024 World Indoor Championships and is a multiple-time national champion. She has competed at multiple major championships, including the 2024 Olympic Games.

== Early and personal life ==
Apostolovski was born in Ljubljana. Her father, Sašo Apostolovski, is a former high jump national record holder. She is coached by Slovenia's current high jump record holder Rožle Prezelj.

== Career ==
Apostolovski began taking high jumping seriously late at 16 years-old, but by 2016 was capable of clearing 1.65 metres. She cleared 1.80 metres at the 2019 European Athletics U20 Championships in Boras, Sweden where she finished in eighth place overall. Later that season though she reached a new personal best of 1.86 metres. She made a significant personal best in 2020, when she managed a jump of 1.92 metres. She made her senior major competition debut at the 2021 European Athletics Indoor Championships in Toruń, Poland, in March 2021, without qualifying for the final. That summer, she he won the bronze medal at the 2021 European Athletics U23 Championships in Tallinn.

She competed at the 2022 World Athletics Championships in Eugene, Oregon where she qualified for her first senior major final, finishing in twelfth place overall. Competing at the 2022 European Athletics Championships in Munich, she reached the final and finished in 7th place (1.90m).

On 21 July 2023, she made her Diamond League debut in Monaco. On 5 August 2023, she set a new personal best, clearing 1.95m at a competition in Heilbronn. At the end of August 2023, she reached the final at the 2023 World Athletics Championships in Budapest, and finished in 9th place (1.90m).

In February 2024, she equalled her personal best at the Banskobystricka latka competition. She secured her first world championship podium at the 2024 World Athletics Indoor Championships in Glasgow, where she won the bronze medal, once again equalling her personal best. She finished third in the high jump at the 2024 Diamond League event 2024 Meeting International Mohammed VI d'Athlétisme in Rabat.

At the 2024 European Athletics Championships in Rome, she again reached the final, this time finishing in 9th place, with the same height as two years earlier (1.90m). She competed in the high jump at the 2024 Paris Olympics where a 1.83 metres clearance was not enough to see her reach the final.

She competed at the 2025 World Athletics Championships in Tokyo, Japan, in September 2025, clearing 1.83 metres without advancing to the final.

Apostolovski won the 2026 Slovenian Indoor Athletics Championships, clearing 1.85 metres. In August 2026, she competed at the 2026 European Athletics Championships in Birmingham, England.
