= Gabriel Oliveira =

Brazilian footballer

Personal information
- Full name: Gabriel Souza Lima de Oliveira
- Date of birth: 17 January 1999 (age 27)
- Place of birth: Salvador, Brazil
- Height: 1.91 m (6 ft 3 in)
- Position: Centre-back

Team information
- Current team: Marília

Youth career
- 2015–2017: Vitória
- 2018–2020: Santos

Senior career*
| Years | Team | Apps | (Gls) |
| 2021 | Ferroviária | 0 | (0) |
| 2022–2023 | CSA | 1 | (0) |
| 2023 | Novo Hamburgo | 2 | (0) |
| 2024 | Olímpico | 11 | (0) |
| 2024–2025 | Anapolina | 12 | (1) |
| 2024 | → Guarany Alagoano (loan) | 10 | (0) |
| 2025 | → Murici (loan) | 4 | (0) |
| 2026 | São-Carlense | 15 | (1) |
| 2026 | São José-SP | 0 | (0) |
| 2027– | Marília | 0 | (0) |

International career
| 2017 | Brazil U20 | 3 | (0) |
- * Club domestic league appearances and goals as of 21:12, 17 June 2026 (UTC)

Gabriel Souza Lima de Oliveira (born 17 January 1999), known as Gabriel Oliveira, is a Brazilian professional footballer who plays as a centre-back for Marília.

== Club career ==
Born in Salvador, Bahia, Gabriel Oliveira began his career with hometown side Vitória, before signing a three-year contract with Santos on 9 March 2018. After only playing for the under-20 and under-23 sides, he agreed to a one-year deal with Ferroviária on 22 April 2021.

Ahead of the 2022 season, Gabriel Oliveira signed for CSA, being initially a member of their under-23 squad. Released by the club on 8 February 2023, he moved to Novo Hamburgo shortly after.

Gabriel Oliveira began the 2024 campaign at Olímpico, before signing for Anapolina in April, and later helping Guarany Alagoano to achieve promotion from the Campeonato Alagoano Second Division. He returned to Anapolna in April 2025, after a short stint at Murici, but featured rarely.

On 8 January 2026, Gabriel Oliveira was announced at São-Carlense. On 17 June, São José-SP announced his signing for the year's Copa Paulista.

== International career ==
On 11 May 2017, Gabriel Oliveira was called up to the Brazil national under-20 team for the 2017 Toulon Tournament. He featured in all three matches during the competition as his nation was eliminated in the group stage.

== Career statistics ==
As of 17 November 2026

| Club | Season | League | | | State League | | Cup | | Continental | | Other | | Total | |
| Club | Season | Division | Apps | Goals | Apps | Goals | Apps | Goals | Apps | Goals | Apps | Goals | Apps | Goals |
|---|---|---|---|---|---|---|---|---|---|---|---|---|---|---|
| Santos | 2018 | Série A | — | | — | | — | | — | | 5 (Note: Appearance(s) in Copa Paulista) | 0 | 5 | 0 |
| Ferroviária | 2021 | Série D | 0 | 0 | — | | — | | — | | — | | 0 | 0 |
| CSA | 2022 | Série B | 0 | 0 | — | | 0 | 0 | — | | — | | 0 | 0 |
| CSA | 2023 | Série C | — | | 1 | 0 | 0 | 0 | — | | 2 (Note: Appearance(s) in Copa Alagoas) | 0 | 3 | 0 |
| CSA | Total | | 0 | 0 | 1 | 0 | 0 | 0 | — | | 2 | 0 | 3 | 0 |
| Novo Hamburgo | 2023 | Série D | 2 | 0 | — | | — | | — | | 1 (Note: Appearance(s) in Copa FGF) | 0 | 3 | 0 |
| Olímpico | 2024 | Sergipano | — | | 11 | 0 | — | | — | | — | | 11 | 0 |
| Anapolina | 2024 | Goiano 2ª Divisão | — | | 10 | 1 | — | | — | | — | | 10 | 1 |
| Anapolina | 2025 | Goiano 2ª Divisão | — | | 2 | 0 | — | | — | | — | | 2 | 0 |
| Anapolina | Total | | — | | 12 | 1 | — | | — | | — | | 12 | 1 |
| Guarany Alagoano (loan) | 2024 | Alagoano 2ª Divisão | — | | 10 | 1 | — | | — | | — | | 10 | 1 |
| Murici (loan) | 2024 | Alagoano | — | | 4 | 0 | — | | — | | 1 | 0 | 5 | 0 |
| São-Carlense | 2026 | Paulista A4 | — | | 15 | 1 | — | | — | | — | | 15 | 1 |
| São José-SP | 2026 | Paulista A2 | — | | — | | — | | — | | 3 | 0 | 3 | 0 |
| Marília | 2027 | Paulista A2 | — | | 0 | 0 | — | | — | | — | | 0 | 0 |
| Career total | | | 2 | 0 | 53 | 3 | 0 | 0 | 0 | 0 | 12 | 0 | 67 | 3 |

== Honours ==
Anapolina

- Campeonato Goiano Segunda Divisão: 2025

São José-SP

- Copa Paulista: 2026
