= Ella Junnila =

Finnish high jumper (born 1998)

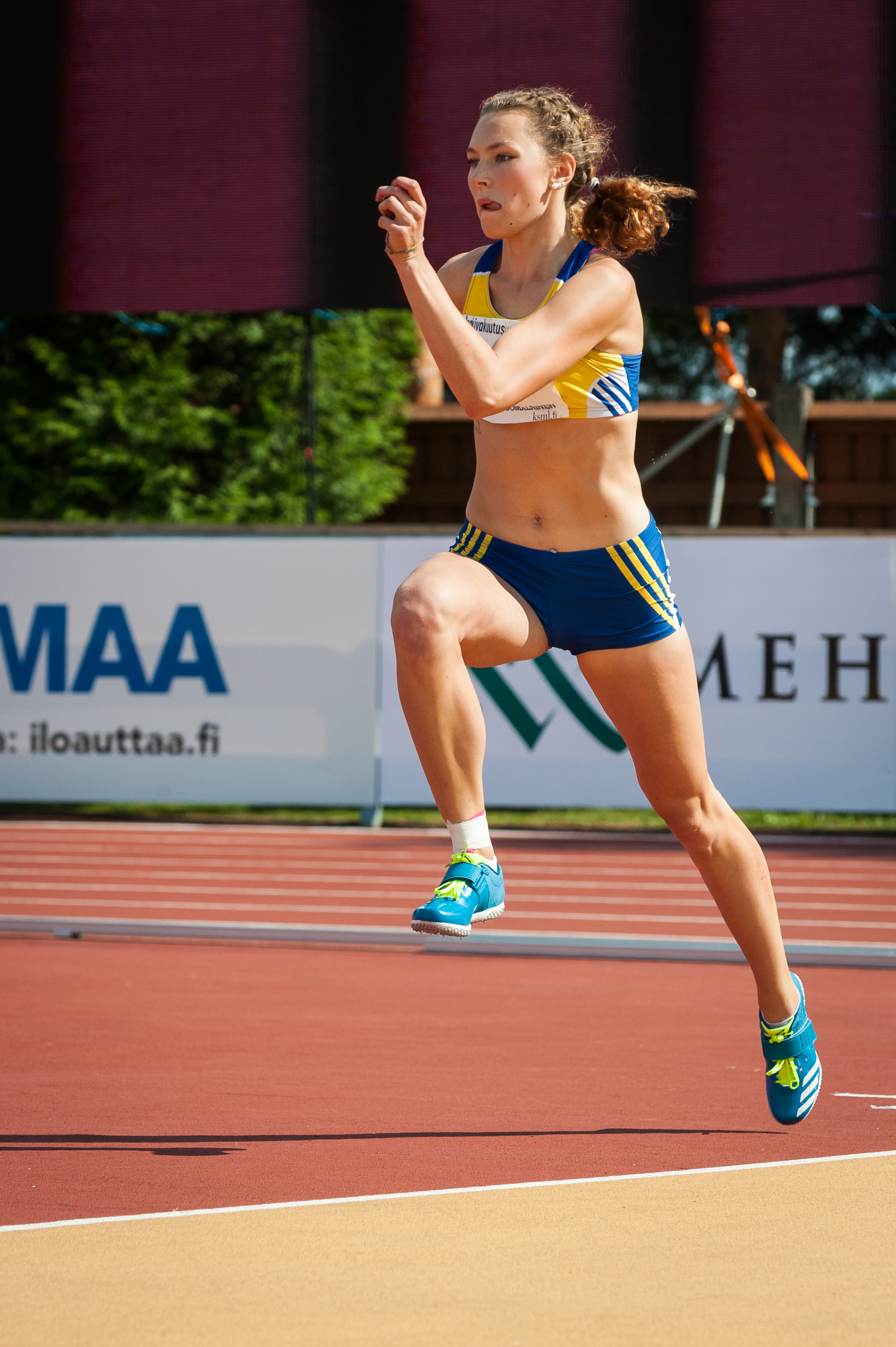
- Ella Junnila at the 2018 Finnish Championships in Athletics

Personal information
- Born: December 6, 1998 (age 27) Espoo, Finland
- Height: 1.83 m (6 ft 0 in)
- Weight: 60 kg (132 lb)

Sport
- Country: Finland
- Sport: Athletics
- Event: High jump

Achievements and titles
- Personal bests: High jump outdoor: 1.97 m NR (2024); High jump indoor: 1.96 m (2021); Long jump: 5.60 m (2018)
Medal record
Women's athletics
Representing Finland
European Indoor Championships
Bronze medal – third place	2021 Toruń	High jump
European U23 Championships
Bronze medal – third place	2019 Gävle	High jump

Ella Juulia Rummukainen (née Junnila, born 6 December 1998) is a Finnish high jumper, who represents Tampereen Pyrintö. She has previously represented Janakkalan Jana and Vammalan seudun Voima. She represented Finland in 2018 European Athletics Championships in high jump and finished 17th with a result of 186 cm. She won a bronze medal at the 2019 European Athletics U23 Championships with a result of 192 cm.

Junnila set a new Finnish record, 194 cm, on 11 June 2019 in Turku at the Paavo Nurmi Games. This earned her a place in the 2019 World Championships in Athletics for high jump. She improved the record by jumping 195 cm on 3 July 2019 in Tampere.

She qualified to represent Finland at the 2020 Summer Olympics in Tokyo and 2024 Summer Olympics in Paris, setting a new national record of 197 cm in the process .

== Competition record ==
Year	Competition	Venue	Position	Notes
Representing Finland in high jump
2017	European U20 Championships	Grosseto, Italy	20th (q)	1.77 m
2019	European U23 Championships	Gävle, Sweden	3rd place, bronze medalist(s)	1.92 m
2019	World Championships	Doha, Qatar	28th (q)	1.80 m
2021	European Indoor Championships	Toruń, Poland	3rd place, bronze medalist(s)	1.96 m
2021	Olympic Games	Tokyo, Japan	22nd (q)	1.86 m
2022	World Championships	Eugene, United States	18th (q)	1.86 m
2022	European Championships	Munich, Germany	19th (q)	1.78 m
2023	World University Games	Chengdu, China	4th	1.84 m
2023	World Championships	Budapest, Hungary	13th	1.90 m
2024	European Championships	Rome, Italy	5th	1.93 m
2024	Olympic Games	Paris, France	28th (q)	1.83 m
2025	European Indoor Championships	Apeldoorn, Netherlands	18th (q)	1.80 m
2025	World Championships	Tokyo, Japan	–	NM
2026	European Championships	Birmingham, United Kingdom	10th	1.88 m

== Personal life ==
Her mother, retired long jumper Ringa Ropo-Junnila, represented Finland at the 1992 Summer Olympics in addition to winning eight national championships and holding the current national record.
