= Engla Nilsson =

Swedish high jumper (born 2005)

Personal information
- Nationality: Swedish
- Born: 20 May 2005 (age 21)

Sport
- Sport: Athletics
- Event: High jump
Medal record
Women's athletics
Representing Sweden
European Indoor Championships
Bronze medal – third place	2025 Apeldoorn	High jump
European U23 Championships
Silver medal – second place	2025 Bergen	High jump

Engla Nilsson (born 20 May 2005) is a Swedish high jumper. She became Swedish national indoor champion and was a bronze medalist at the European Indoor Championships in 2025.

== Biography ==
A member of Örgryte IS athletics, she made her debut in a Swedish national vest with a 1.70 metres personal best to win the Finnkampen U18 in Helsinki in September 2022.

She jumped 1.83 metres to finish third at the Swedish Athletics Championships in July 2023. She then set a new personal best of 1.86 metres to finish fifth in the high jump at the 2023 European Athletics U20 Championships in Jerusalem. It was the third time in the year she improved her personal best. She won the Kungälvs-Posten award for Sports Profile of the Year 2023.

She won her first national championships in winning the Swedish national indoor title in February 2025, with a personal best height of 1.88 metres. Making her senior championship debut at the 2025 European Athletics Indoor Championships she set a new personal best of 1.89 metres. In the final, she cleared 1.92 metres, a personal best by three centimetres, to win the bronze medal in the competition behind Angelina Topić and world record holder Yaroslava Mahuchikh. That month she withdrew from the competition prior to the commencement of the 2025 World Athletics Indoor Championships in Nanjing, China.

She finished joint-fourth with a height of 1.91 metres in Stockholm at the 2025 BAUHAUS-galan event, part of the 2025 Diamond League in June 2025. She cleared 1.93 metres to win the silver medal behind Angelina Topić at the 2025 European Athletics U23 Championships in Bergen, Norway on 19 July 2025. She competed at the 2025 World Athletics Championships in Tokyo, Japan, in September 2025, clearing 1.88 metres without advancing to the final.

In August 2026, she competed at the 2026 European Athletics Championships in Birmingham, England.

== Personal life ==
She is from Kungälv. Her father was able to watch from the stands when she won the bronze medal at the 2025 European Indoor Championships. Prior to that competition her boyfriend had joked that she should "try not to come last".
