= Maja Nilsson =

Swedish high jumper

Personal information
- Nationality: Swedish
- Born: Maja Helena Nilsson; 8 December 1999 (age 26)

Sport
- Sport: Track and Field
- Event: high jump
Medal record
Women's athletics
Representing Sweden
European U23 Championships
Silver medal – second place	2021 Tallinn	Hugh jump
European U20 Championships
Bronze medal – third place	2017 Grosseto	High jump
European U18 Championships
Gold medal – first place	2016 Tbilisi	High jump

Maja Helena Nilsson (born 8 December 1999) is a Swedish athlete who specializes in the high jump. She competed at the 2020 Olympic Games and 2022 World Athletics Championships.

== Career ==
Nilsson gained her first international experience at the European Youth Olympic Festival (EYOF) 2015 in Tbilisi where she won the silver medal in the high jump with a jump of 1.80 metres. The following year, again in Tbilisi, she won the 2016 European Youth Athletics Championships high jump with a 1.82 metres jump. She was a bronze medalist at the 2017 European Athletics U20 Championships in Grosseto, Italy with a jump of 1.85 metres. She also competed at the 2018 U20 World Championships in Tampere, and at the 2019 European Athletics U23 Championships in Gävle.

In 2021 Nilsson became Swedish high jump indoor champion, and on 30 June 2021 she jumped 1.96 metres to meet the Olympic qualifying standard for the delayed 2020 Olympic Games. Competing at the Games, in Tokyo in 2021, Nilsson successfully reached the final where she finished in thirteenth place. She competed at the 2021 European Athletics Indoor Championships in Toruń, Poland in March 2021, where she jumped 1.87 metres but did not progress to the final. She won silver at the 2021 European Athletics U23 Championships in Tallinn.

She competed at the 2022 World Athletics Championships in Eugene, Oregon, where she cleared 1.90 metres without progressing to the final. She competed at the 2022 European Athletics Championships in Munich, Germany, clearing 1.83 metres but did not qualify for the final.

At the 2024 European Athletics Championships in Rome, Italy, she reached the final with a jump of 1.89 metres, placing twelfth overall.
