= Yuliya Chumachenko =

Ukrainian high jumper

Yuliya Chumachenko Yuliia Chumachenko
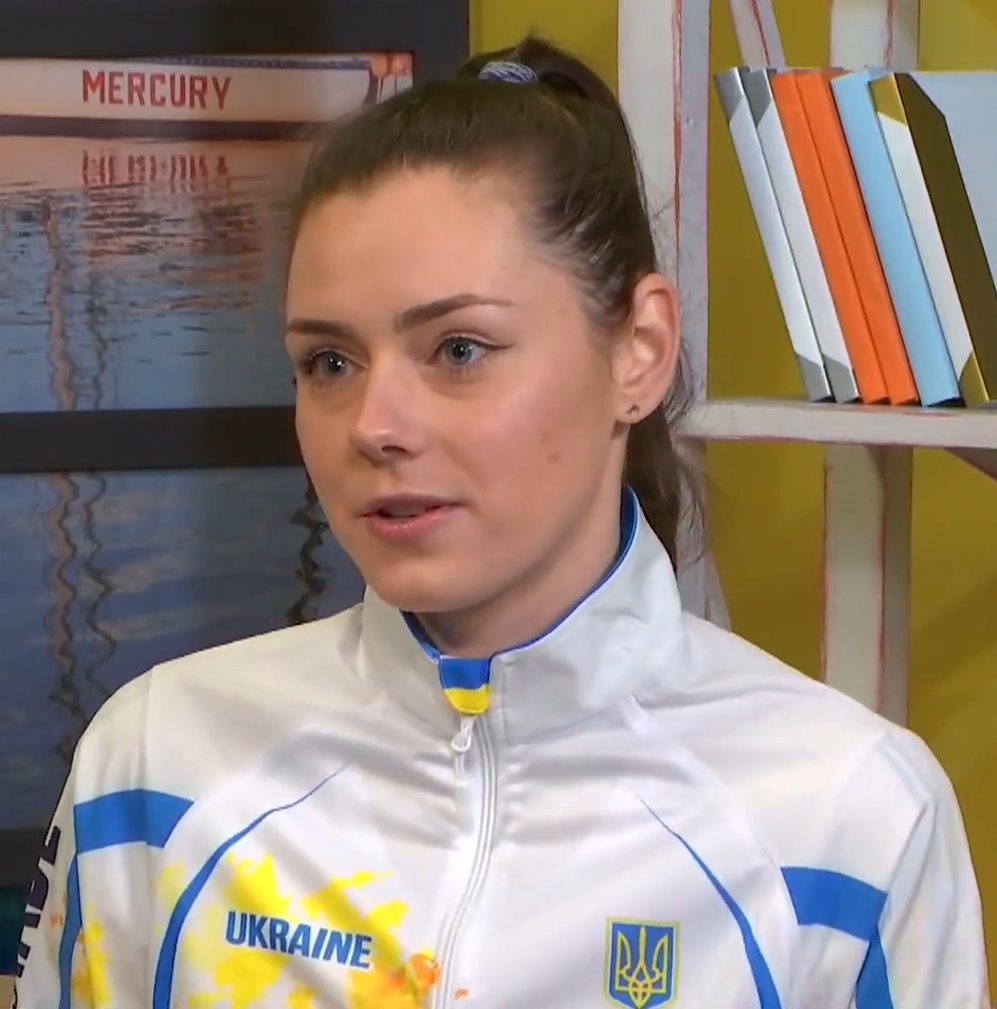
- Yuliya Chumachenko in February 2020

Personal information
- Nationality: Ukrainian
- Born: 2 October 1994 (age 31) Mykolaiv, Ukraine
- Height: 1.85 m (6 ft 1 in)
- Weight: 65 kg (143 lb)

Sport
- Country: Ukraine
- Sport: Track and field
- Event: High jump
Medal record
Women's athletics
Representing Ukraine
World University Games
Gold medal – first place	2019 Napoli	High jump

Yuliya Chumachenko or Yuliia Chumachenko (Ukrainian: Юлія Чумаченко; born 2 October 1994) is a Ukrainian athlete who specialises in the high jump. She has qualified for 2016 Summer Olympics, World Summer Universiade Winner 2019. Balkan Indoor Championships winner 2020.

== Personal bests ==
=== Outdoor ===
Event	Record	Venue	Date
High jump	1.94	Mykolaïv; Naples	18 May 2018; 13 July 2019

=== Indoor ===
Event	Record	Venue	Date
High jump	1.93	Kherson; Sumy	5 March 2016; 10 February 2018; 7 February 2019
