= Elisabeth Pihela =

Estonian athlete

Personal information
- Nationality: Estonia
- Born: 15 March 2004 (age 22)

Sport
- Sport: Athletics
- Event: High Jump

Achievements and titles
- Personal best: High jump: 1.92m (2023)
Medal record
Women's athletics
Representing Estonia
European U20 Championships
Silver medal – second place	2023 Jerusalem	High jump
Bronze medal – third place	2021 Tallinn	High jump

Elisabeth Pihela (born 15 March 2004) is an Estonian track and field athlete who competes in the high jump. She has represented Estonia at major championships including the 2024 Olympic Games and the 2023 and 2025 World Athletics Championships.

== Career ==
At the 2021 European Athletics U20 Championships, she won the bronze medal in the high jump with a new personal best clearance of 1.86 metres, in Tallinn, Estonia. At the same event in 2023 in Jerusalem, Israel, she won the silver medal, jumping 1.88 metres to finish runner-up behind Angelina Topić.

She finished in fourth place at the 2021 World Athletics U20 Championships in Nairobi, Kenya, with a jump of 1.87 metres. She finished sixth in the high jump at the 2022 World Athletics U20 Championships in Cali, Colombia, managing a clearance of 1.80 metres.

In June 2023, she set a new personal best clearing 1.92m in Pärnu. That month she also cleared 1.91m at the Diamond League event in Lausanne. Pihela competed at the 2023 World Athletics Championships in Budapest, Hungary, in August 2023 where she had a best jump of 1.89 metres, equal to the height with which some qualified for the final, but missed out on the last spot for the final through countback. The following week, she competed at the 2023 Xiamen Diamond League event, in Xiamen, China, in September 2023, and finished fourth in the high jump with a best height of 1.89 metres.

She competed in the high jump at the 2024 Olympic Games in Paris, France, clearing a best jump of 1.83 metres to finish 26th in qualification and not proceeding to the final.

She finished in sixth place at the 2025 European Athletics Indoor Championships in Apeldoorn, Netherlands, with a jump of 1.89 metres. She competed at the 2025 Xiamen Diamond League event in China, in April 2025. She was a finalist in September at the 2025 World Athletics Championships in Tokyo, Japan.
