= 2016 IAAF World U20 Championships – Women's high jump =

The women's high jump event at the 2016 IAAF World U20 Championships was held at Zdzisław Krzyszkowiak Stadium on 22 and 24 July.

== Medalists ==
Gold	Michaela Hrubá; Czech Republic
Silver	Ximena Esquivel; Mexico
Bronze	Yuliya Levchenko; Ukraine

== Records ==
Standing records prior to the 2016 IAAF World U20 Championships in Athletics
World Junior Record	Olga Turchak (URS)	2.01	Moscow, Soviet Union	7 July 1986
World Junior Record	Heike Balck (GDR)	2.01	Karl-Marx-Stadt, East Germany	18 June 1989
Championship Record	Alina Astafei (ROM)	2.00	Sudbury, Canada	29 July 1988
World Junior Leading	Vashti Cunningham (USA)	1.97	Eugene, United States	3 July 2016

== Results ==
=== Qualification ===
Qualification: 1.84 (Q) or at least 12 best performers (q) qualified for the final.

Rank	Group	Name	Nationality	1.70	1.74	1.77	1.80	Result	Note
1	A	Yuliya Levchenko	Ukraine	–	o	o	o	1.80	q
1	A	Lara Omerzu	Slovenia	o	o	o	o	1.80	q
1	A	Lada Pejchalová	Czech Republic	o	o	o	o	1.80	q
1	B	Michaela Hrubá	Czech Republic	–	o	o	o	1.80	q
1	B	Salome Lang	Switzerland	o	o	o	o	1.80	q
1	B	Mareike Max	Germany	o	o	o	o	1.80	q
1	B	Claire Orcel	Belgium	o	o	o	o	1.80	q
8	B	Ximena Esquivel	Mexico	o	o	xo	o	1.80	q
9	A	María Fernanda Murillo	Colombia	xxo	o	o	o	1.80	q
10	A	Nawal Meniker	France	o	o	o	xo	1.80	q
10	B	Nicole Greene	United States	o	o	o	xo	1.80	q
12	B	Liliya Klyntsova	Ukraine	o	o	xo	xo	1.80	q
13	A	Mona Gottschämmer	Germany	xo	o	xo	xo	1.80	q
14	A	Karla Terán	Mexico	o	xxo	xo	xxx	1.77	
15	B	Maryia Zhodzik	Belarus	xo	xxo	xo	xxx	1.77	
16	B	Nadezhda Dubovitskaya	Kazakhstan	o	o	xxx		1.74	
17	A	Saleta Fernández	Spain	xo	xo	xxx		1.74	

=== Final ===
Rank	Name	Nationality	1.74	1.79	1.83	1.86	1.89	1.91	1.95	Result	Note
1st place, gold medalist(s)	Michaela Hrubá	Czech Republic	o	o	o	o	o	xo	xxx	1.91	
2nd place, silver medalist(s)	Ximena Esquivel	Mexico	o	xo	o	xo	xxo	xxx		1.89	
3rd place, bronze medalist(s)	Yuliya Levchenko	Ukraine	o	o	o	o	xxx			1.86	
4	Lada Pejchalová	Czech Republic	o	xo	xo	o	xxx			1.86	
5	Nicole Greene	United States	o	o	o	xxx				1.83	
5	Mareike Max	Germany	o	o	o	xxx				1.83	
7	Salome Lang	Switzerland	o	xo	o	xxx				1.83	
8	Nawal Meniker	France	o	o	xo	xxx				1.83	
9	Liliya Klyntsova	Ukraine	o	o	xxo	xxx				1.83	PB
9	María Fernanda Murillo	Colombia	o	o	xxo	xxx				1.83	
11	Mona Gottschämmer	Germany	xo	o	xxx					1.79	
12	Lara Omerzu	Slovenia	xxo	o	xxx					1.79	
13	Claire Orcel	Belgium	o	xo	xxx					1.79	
