= Chuah =

Chuah may refer to:

- Chuah (state constituency), in Negeri Sembilan, Malaysia
- Chuah (surname), or Cai and other variants, including a list of people with the name
- Elizabeth Chuah Lamb (born 1991), New Zealand athlete
