= Athletics at the 2017 Summer Universiade – Women's high jump =

The women's high jump event at the 2017 Summer Universiade was held on 26 and 28 August in Taipei City.

== Medalists ==
Gold	Silver	Bronze
Oksana Okuneva; Ukraine	Iryna Herashchenko; Ukraine	Airinė Palšytė; Lithuania

== Results ==
=== Qualification ===
Qualification: 1.91 m (Q) or at least 12 best (q) qualified for the final.

Rank	Group	Athlete	Nationality	1.50	1.60	1.65	1.70	1.75	1.80	Result	Notes
1	B	Jossie Graumann	Germany	–	–	–	–	–	o	1.80	q
1	B	Airinė Palšytė	Lithuania	–	–	–	–	–	o	1.80	q
3	A	Julia du Plessis	South Africa	–	–	o	o	o	–	1.75	q
3	A	Ximena Esquivel	Mexico	–	–	–	–	o	–	1.75	q, =SB
3	A	Nicola McDermott	Australia	–	–	–	–	o	–	1.75	q
3	A	Oksana Okuneva	Ukraine	–	–	–	o	o	–	1.75	q
3	A	Marija Vuković	Montenegro	–	–	–	–	o	–	1.75	q
3	B	Iryna Herashchenko	Ukraine	–	–	–	–	o	–	1.75	q
3	B	Hannah Joye	Australia	–	–	–	–	o	–	1.75	q
3	B	Gloria Alejandra Maldonado	Mexico	–	–	–	o	o	–	1.75	q, =PB
3	B	Yeung Man Wai	Hong Kong	–	–	–	o	o	–	1.75	q
12	B	Tatiana Dunajská	Slovakia	–	o	o	o	xxx		1.70	q
13	A	Teele Treiel	Estonia	–	o	xo	o	xxx		1.70	=SB
14	A	Erika Seyama	Swaziland	–	o	xo	xxo	xxx		1.70	
15	B	Teele Palumaa	Estonia	–	o	o	xxx			1.65	
15	B	Veronika Podlesnik	Slovenia	–	o	o	xxx			1.65	
	A	Rehma Khalid	Pakistan	xxx						NM	

=== Final ===
Rank	Athlete	Nationality	1.70	1.75	1.80	1.84	1.88	1.91	1.94	1.97	2.00	Result	Notes
1st place, gold medalist(s)	Oksana Okuneva	Ukraine	–	–	o	o	xo	o	xxo	o	xxx	1.97	=SB
2nd place, silver medalist(s)	Iryna Herashchenko	Ukraine	–	–	o	o	o	o	xxx			1.91	
3rd place, bronze medalist(s)	Airinė Palšytė	Lithuania	–	–	o	o	o	xo	xx–	–	x	1.91	
4	Marija Vuković	Montenegro	–	o	o	o	xo	xxx				1.88	
4	Ximena Esquivel	Mexico	–	o	o	o	xo	xxx				1.88	SB
4	Jossie Graumann	Germany	–	–	o	o	xo	xxx				1.88	
7	Nicola McDermott	Australia	–	–	o	o	xxo	xxx				1.88	
8	Yeung Man Wai	Hong Kong	–	o	o	xo	xxx					1.84	
9	Hannah Joye	Australia	–	o	o	xxo	xxx					1.84	
10	Julia du Plessis	South Africa	o	o	o	xxx						1.80	
11	Gloria Alejandra Maldonado	Mexico	o	o	xxo	xxx						1.80	PB
12	Tatiana Dunajská	Slovakia	o	xxx								1.70	
