= Morgan Lake =

British athlete (born 1997)

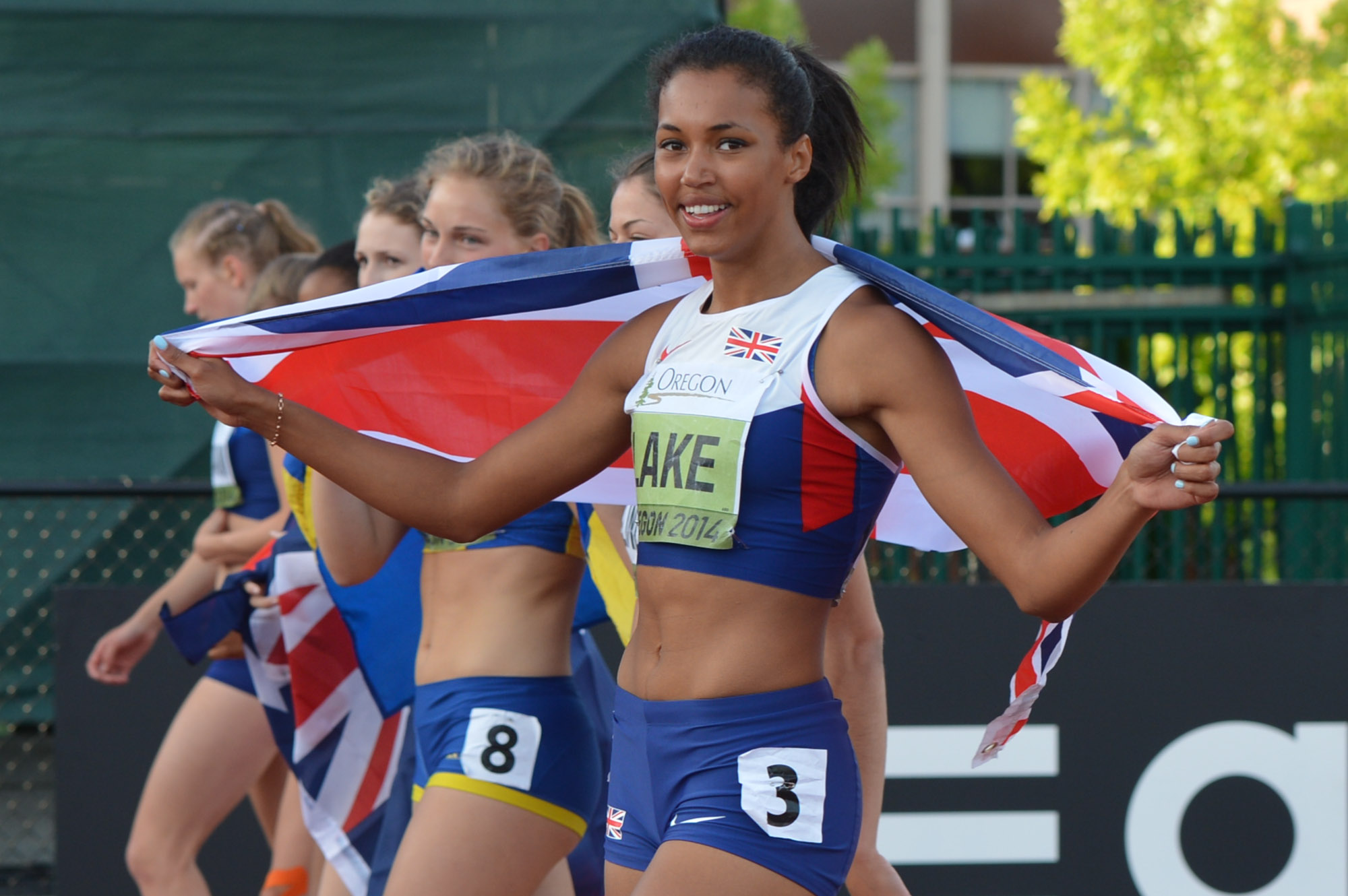
- Lake at the 2014 World Junior Championships in Eugene, United States

Personal information
- Full name: Morgan Alexandra Lake
- Born: 12 May 1997 (age 29) Milton Keynes, Buckinghamshire, England
- Height: 1.80 m (5 ft 11 in)
- Weight: 68 kg (150 lb)

Sport
- Country: Great Britain; England
- Sport: Athletics
- Event: High jump
- Club: Windsor, Slough, Eton and Hounslow AC

Achievements and titles
- Personal bests: High jump: 2.00 m NR (Zurich, 2025); Heptathlon: 6148 pts (Eugene, 2014); Indoors; High jump: 1.99 m NR (Hustopeče, 2023); Pentathlon: 4527 pts NU20R (Prague, 2015)
Medal record
Women's athletics
Representing Great Britain
Athletics World Cup
Silver medal – second place	2018 London	High jump
World Junior Championships
Gold medal – first place	2014 Oregon	High jump
Gold medal – first place	2014 Oregon	Heptathlon
European Junior Championships
Gold medal – first place	2015 Eskilstuna	High jump
Representing England
Commonwealth Games
Silver medal – second place	2018 Gold Coast	High jump

Morgan Alexandra Lake (born 12 May 1997) is a British high jumper. She won the silver medal at the 2018 Commonwealth Games and placed fourth at the 2022 Commonwealth Games. Lake finished sixth in the 2017 World Championships and fourth in the 2018 World Indoor Championships. She is the first British woman to break two metres, jumping 2.00 at the Zurich Diamond League, in August 2025.

In 2013, she broke the 29-year-old UK Under-17 high jump record, and the following year, she broke the 23-year-old UK U20 high jump record. A successful combined events athlete as a teenager, at age 17 Lake won the high jump and heptathlon titles at the 2014 World U20 Championships. She also broke the world indoor U18 pentathlon record that year. In 2015, she was the European U20 high jump champion. At the 2016 Rio Olympics, Lake became the first British woman to reach an Olympic high jump final since Debbie Marti in 1992. She holds the British record in the high jump. She has won 17 British national titles as of 2025, including ten successive outdoor national championships.

== Athletics career ==
Born in Reading, Berkshire, England, Lake began to compete competitively as an under-13 in 2008 at Slough Juniors Athletics Club. In 2009, she broke the UK U13 pentathlon record with 3046 points. In 2011, she broke the U15 record with 3755 points. At the English Schools Championships, she won the pentathlon and long jump in 2010 (U15) and the long jump in 2012 (U17). In 2013, the 15-year-old finished second in the high jump at the British Indoor Championships.

=== Coaching ===
Lake competes for Windsor, Slough, Eton and Hounslow Athletic Club and is coached by her father Eldon Lake. She also receives specialist coaching from Jeremy Tigar in the throw disciplines (shot put and javelin), Richard Aspden in the high jump and Ian Grant in the hurdles.

=== 2013 ===
At the 2013 World Youth Championships in Donetsk, Ukraine, Lake led after day one of the heptathlon by 192 points. The day included a UK Under 17 record of 1.90 m in the high jump, a height that would have been good enough to win the individual high jump event. The previous record of 1.89 m by Debbie Marti had stood for 29 years. However, on day two she could only manage 4.63 m in the long jump, followed by two fouls. Then in the javelin, she could only throw 30.81 m. These performances saw her drop down to sixth and she withdrew from the competition before the final event, the 800 metres race.

=== 2014 ===
In February 2014, Lake competed in an indoor athletics event in Vaxjo, Sweden, where she broke the World U18 record for the pentathlon, improving Carolina Klüft's score of 4261, with 4284 points.

On 2 and 3 May 2014, Lake won the prestigious Multistars international event in her debut at the senior heptathlon. Still 9 days short of her 17th birthday, she became by four years the youngest champion in the 27-year history of the event. Her score of 5896 points exceeded by 780 points the performance (5116 points) achieved by Olympic champion Jessica Ennis-Hill at the age of 17 when placing 13th in the same event in 2003. Lake's performance also exceeded by 415 points the previous UK Youth record for the heptathlon (5481 points), set in 2009 by Katarina Johnson-Thompson.

On 18 May, she broke the 23-year-old UK junior high jump record with a clearance of 1.93 m in Loughborough. The previous record of 1.91 m was set by Lea Haggett in 1991 and was equalled in 1997 by Susan Jones.

On 31 May and 1 June 2014, Lake competed at the Hypo-Meeting in Götzis, Austria, generally considered the premier multi-events meeting in the annual athletics calendar. She achieved 17th place, improving her lifetime best score and UK Youth record by 185 points to a total of 6081 points. This performance also ranked her second on the UK U20 all-time list, behind Johnson-Thompson, and improved by 90 points the European U18 record of 5991 points achieved in 2005 by Tatyana Chernova of Russia, the 2011 World Champion at heptathlon. Lake's individual performances in Götzis included three new personal bests in the shot put, a personal best in the 200 metres and two personal bests in the javelin throw.

In July 2014, Lake and her coaches initially planned to have her compete in the Glasgow Commonwealth Games, but decided against it and headed for the 2014 World Junior Championships in Eugene, United States instead. She began her campaign at the championships on 22 July with the 100 m hurdles, finishing 12th overall with a time of 14.29 s. She stormed to the top of the heptathlon table with 2096 points, setting a British junior record of 1.94 m in the high jump. The only athlete to have cleared 1.85 m, she attempted a world U18 record and British senior record height of 1.97 m, but failed to clear it. She began the afternoon session with a win in the shot put, throwing 14.17 m to take her total to 2901 points. She closed the day with the 200 m, finishing in third place behind German world youth champion Celina Leffler and Dutch athlete Nadine Visser to end with a total of 3821 points and remain at the top of the heptathlon table. Lake started the second day relatively poorly, finishing fourth in the long jump in with a distance of 5.90 m. However, her total rose to 4640 points, still enough to keep her at the top of the heptathlon table. She finished in sixth place in the javelin throw the same morning with a personal best of 41.66 m, but remained on top of the overall table. Lake then closed the day with a seventh-place finish in the 800 m with a personal best time of 2:21.06, but secured the gold medal with a final total of 6148 points, ahead of Cuban Yorgelis Rodríguez and Visser.

On 27 July, the final day of the championships, Lake competed in the individual high jump event, and took her second gold medal with a height of 1.93 m. She and silver medallist Michaela Hrubá of the Czech Republic were the only competitors to have managed to clear 1.91 m. Lake went on to make three attempts at 1.97 m as she did in the heptathlon high jump five days earlier, but again failed to set a new British senior record.

=== 2016–2018 ===
In August 2016, Lake competed for Team GB at the Rio Olympics in the individual high jump event, achieving a personal best of 1.94 m and reaching the final. In the finals, she finished joint 10th with a leap of 1.93 m.

In 2017, she jumped her personal best of 1.97 m in Birmingham, the second best jump ever by a British female.

Lake finished fourth at the 2018 World Indoor Championships, with a clearance of 1.93 metres, missing out on a medal on countback. A month later, she won a silver medal at the Commonwealth Games, with another clearance of 1.93 m.

=== 2019–2021 ===
Lake was selected to represent Great Britain at the 2019 World Athletics Championships in Doha, Qatar. She competed in the high jump and was eliminated during qualification after failing at 1.89 m.

In 2020, she became British champion for the fifth successive year when winning the high jump event at the British Athletics Championships with a jump of 1.80 metres. She also finished second in the indoor competition with 1.84 m.

In 2021, Lake once again won the British Championships with a leap of 1.93 m. At the postponed 2020 Tokyo Olympics, she qualified for the final with 1.95 m but withdrew due to injury.

=== 2022–present ===
In 2022, she won the British title again, finished fourth in the Birmingham Commonwealth Games and seventh at the European Championships in Munich.

On 4 February 2023, Lake broke the British indoor high jump record with a clearance of 1.99 metres in Hustopeče, Czech Republic.

After winning the high jump gold medal at the 2024 British Athletics Championships, Lake was subsequently named in the Great Britain team for the 2024 Summer Olympics. She failed to qualify for the final at the Games in Paris with a best clearance of 1.88 metres which was 4 cm short of the height required to get through.

On 19 July 2025, she won the high jump at the London Diamond League Meeting with a clearance of 1.96 metres. Lake then won her tenth consecutive British outdoor title at the 2025 UK Athletics Championships.

Lake set a new British record by clearing 2.00 metres at the first attempt as she finished third at the Diamond League final in Zurich on 27 August 2025.

== Statistics ==
=== International competitions ===
Representing Great Britain / England
Year	Competition	Venue	Position	Event	Result
2013	World Youth Championships	Donetsk, Ukraine	–	Heptathlon	DNF
2014	World Junior Championships	Eugene, United States	1st	High jump	1.93 m
2014	World Junior Championships	Eugene, United States	1st	Heptathlon	6148 PB
2014	European Championships	Zürich, Switzerland	17th (q)	High jump	1.85 m
2015	European Indoor Championships	Prague, Czech Republic	9th	Pentathlon	4527 PB
2015	European Junior Championships	Eskilstuna, Sweden	1st	High jump	1.91 m
2015	World Championships	Beijing, China	14th (q)	High jump	1.89 m
2016	World Indoor Championships	Portland, United States	6th	Pentathlon	4499
2016	European Championships	Amsterdam, Netherlands	–	Heptathlon	DNF
2016	Olympic Games	Rio de Janeiro, Brazil	10th	High jump	1.93 m
2017	European Indoor Championships	Belgrade, Serbia	8th	High jump	1.85 m
2017	European Team Championships Super League	Villeneuve-d'Ascq, France	7th	High jump	1.85 m
2017	World Championships	London, United Kingdom	6th	High jump	1.95 m
2018	World Indoor Championships	Birmingham, United Kingdom	4th	High jump	1.93 m SB
2018	Commonwealth Games	Gold Coast, Australia	2nd	High jump	1.93 m
2018	World Cup	London, United Kingdom	2nd	High jump	1.93 m
2018	European Championships	Berlin, Germany	7th	High jump	1.91 m
2019	European Indoor Championships	Glasgow, United Kingdom	9th	High jump	1.91 m
2019	European U23 Championships	Gävle, Sweden	6th	High jump	1.85 m
2019	World Championships	Doha, Qatar	18th	High jump	1.85 m
2021	European Indoor Championships	Toruń, Poland	13th	High jump	1.87 m
2021	Olympic Games	Tokyo, Japan	– (f)	High jump	DNS (q: 1.95)
2022	World Championships	Eugene, United States	– (q)	High jump	DNS
2022	Commonwealth Games	Birmingham, United Kingdom	4th	High jump	1.92 m
2022	European Championships	Munich, Germany	7th	High jump	1.90 m
2023	European Indoor Championships	Istanbul, Turkey	7th	High jump	1.86 m
2023	World Championships	Budapest, Hungary	4th	High jump	1.97 m
2024	World Indoor Championships	Glasgow, United Kingdom	6th	High jump	1.92 m
2024	European Championships	Rome, Italy	6th	High jump	1.90 m
2024	Olympic Games	Paris, France	15th (q)	High jump	1.88 m
2025	European Indoor Championships	Apeldoorn, Netherlands	5th	High jump	1.92 m
2025	World Championships	Tokyo, Japan	7th	High jump	1.93 m
2026	Commonwealth Games	Glasgow, United Kingdom	–	High jump	NM
2026	European Championships	Birmingham, United Kingdom	8th	High jump	1.88 m

=== National titles ===
- British Athletics Championships - 10 titles
  - High jump: 2016, 2017, 2018, 2019, 2020, 2021, 2022, 2023, 2024, 2025
- British Indoor Athletics Championships - 7 titles
  - High jump indoor: 2016, 2017, 2018, 2019, 2023, 2024, 2025
