= 2010 World Junior Championships in Athletics – Women's high jump =

Athletics event

The women's high jump at the 2010 World Junior Championships in Athletics was held at the Moncton 2010 Stadium on 23 & 25 July.

== Medalists ==
Gold	Silver	Bronze
Marija Vuković; Montenegro	Airinė Palšytė; Lithuania	Elena Vallortigara; Italy

== Records ==
Prior to the competition, the existing world junior and championship records were as follows.

	Name	Nationality	Time	Location	Date
World junior record	Olga Turchak; Heike Balck	Soviet Union; East Germany	2.01	Moscow; Karl-Marx-Stadt	July 7, 1986; June 18, 1989
World Leading	Airinė Palšytė	Lithuania	1.92	Budapest	20 June 2010

== Results ==
=== Final ===
25 July

Rank	Name	Nationality	Height	Notes
1st place, gold medalist(s)	Marija Vuković	Montenegro	1.91	NR
2nd place, silver medalist(s)	Airinė Palšytė	Lithuania	1.89	
3rd place, bronze medalist(s)	Elena Vallortigara	Italy	1.89	
4	Hanne Van Hessche	Belgium	1.86	
5	Hannah Willms	United States	1.82	
6	Sietske Noorman	Netherlands	1.82	
7	Victoria Dronsfield	Sweden	1.78	
8	Amy Pejkovic	Australia	1.78	
9	Elizabeth Lamb	New Zealand	1.78	
10	France Paul	France	1.78	
11	Chiara Vitobello	Italy	1.73	
12	Michalina Kwaśniewska	Poland	1.73	

=== Qualifications ===
23 July

Qualification standard 1.83 m or at least best 12 qualified.

==== Group A ====
Rank	Name	Nationality	Result	Notes
1	Chiara Vitobello	Italy	1.81	q
1	Airinė Palšytė	Lithuania	1.81	q
3	Marija Vuković	Montenegro	1.81	q
3	Elizabeth Lamb	New Zealand	1.81	q
3	Michalina Kwaśniewska	Poland	1.81	q
6	Victoria Dronsfield	Sweden	1.81	q
7	France Paul	France	1.78	q
8	Maya Pressley	United States	1.78	
9	Holly Parent	Canada	1.78	
10	Valeryia Bahdanovich	Belarus	1.78	
11	Betsabée Páez	Argentina	1.74	
11	Massiel Jiménez	Dominican Republic	1.74	
13	Wu Meng-Chia	Chinese Taipei	1.74	
14	Alexandra Plaza	Germany	1.74	
15	Emily Crutcher	Australia	1.65	

==== Group B ====
Rank	Name	Nationality	Result	Notes
1	Hanne Van Hessche	Belgium	1.81	q
1	Elena Vallortigara	Italy	1.81	q
1	Sietske Noorman	Netherlands	1.81	q
1	Hannah Willms	United States	1.81	q
5	Amy Pejkovic	Australia	1.78	q
6	Deborah Brodersen	Germany	1.78	
7	Isobel Pooley	United Kingdom	1.78	
7	Agnieszka Bukowczyk	Poland	1.78	
7	Maruša Černjul	Slovenia	1.78	
10	Leontia Kallenou	Cyprus	1.78	
11	Katarina Mögenburg	Norway	1.78	
12	Cristina Ferrando	Spain	1.74	
12	Keeley O'Hagan	New Zealand	1.74	
14	Lisa Egarter	Austria	1.74	
15	Alyxandria Treasure	Canada	1.70	

== Participation ==
According to an unofficial count, 30 athletes from 23 countries participated in the event.

- Argentina (1)
- Australia (2)
- Austria (1)
- Belarus (1)
- Belgium (1)
- Canada (2)
- Chinese Taipei (1)
- Cyprus (1)
- Dominican Republic (1)
- France (1)
- Germany (2)
- Italy (2)
- Lithuania (1)
- Montenegro (1)
- Netherlands (1)
- New Zealand (2)
- Norway (1)
- Poland (2)
- Slovenia (1)
- Spain (1)
- Sweden (1)
- United Kingdom (1)
- United States (2)
