= Athletics at the 2015 Summer Universiade – Women's high jump =

The women's high jump event at the 2015 Summer Universiade was held on 12 July at the Gwangju Universiade Main Stadium.

== Results ==
Rank	Athlete	Nationality	1.60	1.70	1.75	1.80	1.84	Result	Notes
1st place, gold medalist(s)	Airinė Palšytė	Lithuania	–	–	o	o	o	1.84	
2nd place, silver medalist(s)	Elizabeth Boyer	United States	o	o	o	o	xxx	1.80	
2nd place, silver medalist(s)	Madara Onužāne	Latvia	–	o	o	o	xxx	1.80	
4	Nicola McDermott	Australia	–	–	o	xo	xxx	1.80	
4	Marija Vuković	Montenegro	o	o	o	xo	xxx	1.80	
6	Katarina Mögenburg	Norway	–	o	o	xxo	xxx	1.80	
7	Katerina Fedotova	Russia	–	o	xo	xxo	xxx	1.80	
8	Elizabeth Chuah Lamb	New Zealand	o	o	o	xxx		1.75	
8	Keeley O'Hagan	New Zealand	o	o	o	xxx		1.75	
8	Linda Sandblom	Finland	o	o	o	xxx		1.75	
8	Grete Udras	Estonia	–	o	o	xxx		1.75	
8	Zhang Luyu	China	o	o	o	xxx		1.75	
14	Linn Vikan	Norway	xo	xo	o	xxx		1.75	PB
15	Rebecca Haworth	Canada	xo	o	xo	xxx		1.75	
16	Alejandra Maldonado	Mexico	o	o	xxo	xxx		1.75	
16	Joel Walker	United States	o	o	xxo	xxx		1.75	
