= 2014 World Junior Championships in Athletics – Women's high jump =

The women's high jump at the 2014 World Junior Championships in Athletics will be held at Hayward Field on 25 and 27 July.

== Medalists ==
Gold	Morgan Lake; Great Britain
Silver	Michaela Hrubá; Czech Republic
Bronze	Irina Ilieva; Russia

== Records ==
Standing records prior to the 2014 World Junior Championships in Athletics
World Junior Record	Olga Turchak (URS)	2.01	Moscow, Soviet Union	7 July 1986
World Junior Record	Heike Balck (GDR)	2.01	Karl-Marx-Stadt, East Germany	18 June 1989
Championship Record	Alina Astafei (ROU)	2.00	Sudbury, Canada	29 July 1988
World Junior Leading	Eleanor Patterson (AUS)	1.94	Gold Coast, Australia	13 July 2014

== Results ==
=== Qualification ===
1.85 m (Q) or at least best 12 qualified (q)

Rank	Group	Name	Nationality	1.65	1.70	1.75	1.79	1.82	1.85	Result	Notes
1	A	Iryna Gerashchenko	Ukraine	–	–	o	o	o	o	1.85	Q
1	B	Akela Jones	Barbados	–	–	o	o	–	o	1.85	SB, Q
3	A	Daniellys Dutil	Cuba	–	o	o	o	xo	o	1.85	Q
4	A	Cassie Purdon	Australia	–	xo	o	o	xo	o	1.85	PB, Q
4	B	Rachel McCoy	United States	o	o	o	xo	xo	o	1.85	PB, Q
6	B	Morgan Lake	Great Britain	–	–	o	o	o	xo	1.85	Q
7	A	Erika Furlani	Italy	–	o	o	o	xo	xxo	1.85	Q
8	B	Michaela Hrubá	Czech Republic	–	o	o	o	o	–	1.82	q
9	B	Krista-Gay Taylor	Jamaica	–	o	o	o	xo	xxx	1.82	PB, q
9	B	Lin Wang	China	–	o	o	o	xo	–	1.82	q
11	A	Irina Ilieva	Russia	–	o	o	xo	xo	xxx	1.82	q
12	A	Lucija Zubcic	Croatia	–	o	xo	xxo	xo	xxx	1.82	SB, q
13	A	Paulina Borys	Poland	–	o	o	xo	xxo	xxx	1.82	PB
13	B	Elina Kakko	Finland	–	o	o	xo	xxo	xxx	1.82	SB
15	B	Eleonora Omoregie	Italy	o	o	xo	xo	xxo	xxx	1.82	
16	B	Gintaré Nesteckyté	Lithuania	–	o	o	o	xxx		1.79	
16	B	Sophie Frank	Germany	o	o	o	o	xxx		1.79	
16	B	Nicola McDermott	Australia	–	o	o	o	xxx		1.79	
16	B	Yorgelis Rodríguez	Cuba	–	o	o	o	xxx		1.79	
20	B	Valerie Bonnet	France	–	o	xo	o	xxx		1.79	
20	A	Rhizlane Siba	Morocco	–	o	xo	o	xxx		1.79	
22	A	Leonie Reuter	Germany	o	o	o	xo	xxx		1.79	
22	B	Ana Paula De Oliveira	Brazil	–	o	o	xo	xxx		1.79	
24	A	Heta Tuuri	Finland	o	o	xo	xo	xxx		1.79	
25	A	Elodie Tshilumba	Luxembourg	–	o	o	xxo	xxx		1.79	
26	A	Ximena Lizbeth Esquivel	Mexico	–	o	xo	xxo	xxx		1.79	
27	A	Petra Luterán	Hungary	o	o	xo	xxx			1.75	
27	A	Bailey Weiland	United States	o	o	xo	xxx			1.75	
29	A	Eliška Buchlovská	Czech Republic	o	o	xxx				1.70	
	B	Lara Omerzu	Slovenia	–	xxx					NM	

=== Final ===
Rank	Name	Nationality	1.73	1.78	1.82	1.85	1.88	1.91	1.93	1.97	Result	Notes
1st place, gold medalist(s)	Morgan Lake	Great Britain	–	o	o	xo	o	o	xo	xxx	1.93	
2nd place, silver medalist(s)	Michaela Hrubá	Czech Republic	–	o	o	xo	o	xxo	xxx		1.91	NJR
3rd place, bronze medalist(s)	Irina Ilieva	Russia	o	o	o	xxo	xo	xxx			1.88	
4	Rachel McCoy	United States	o	o	xo	o	xxo	xxx			1.88	PB
5	Iryna Gerashchenko	Ukraine	–	o	o	o	xxx				1.85	
6	Cassie Purdon	Australia	o	o	o	o	xxx				1.85	=PB
7	Erika Furlani	Italy	o	o	o	xxo	xxx				1.85	
8	Lin Wang	China	xo	o	xo	xxx					1.82	
9	Lucija Zubcic	Croatia	o	o	xxo	xxx					1.82	=SB
10	Daniellys Dutil	Cuba	o	o	xxx						1.78	
11	Krista-Gay Taylor	Jamaica	o	xxx							1.73	
	Akela Jones	Barbados									DNS	
