= Elena Vallortigara =

Italian high jumper

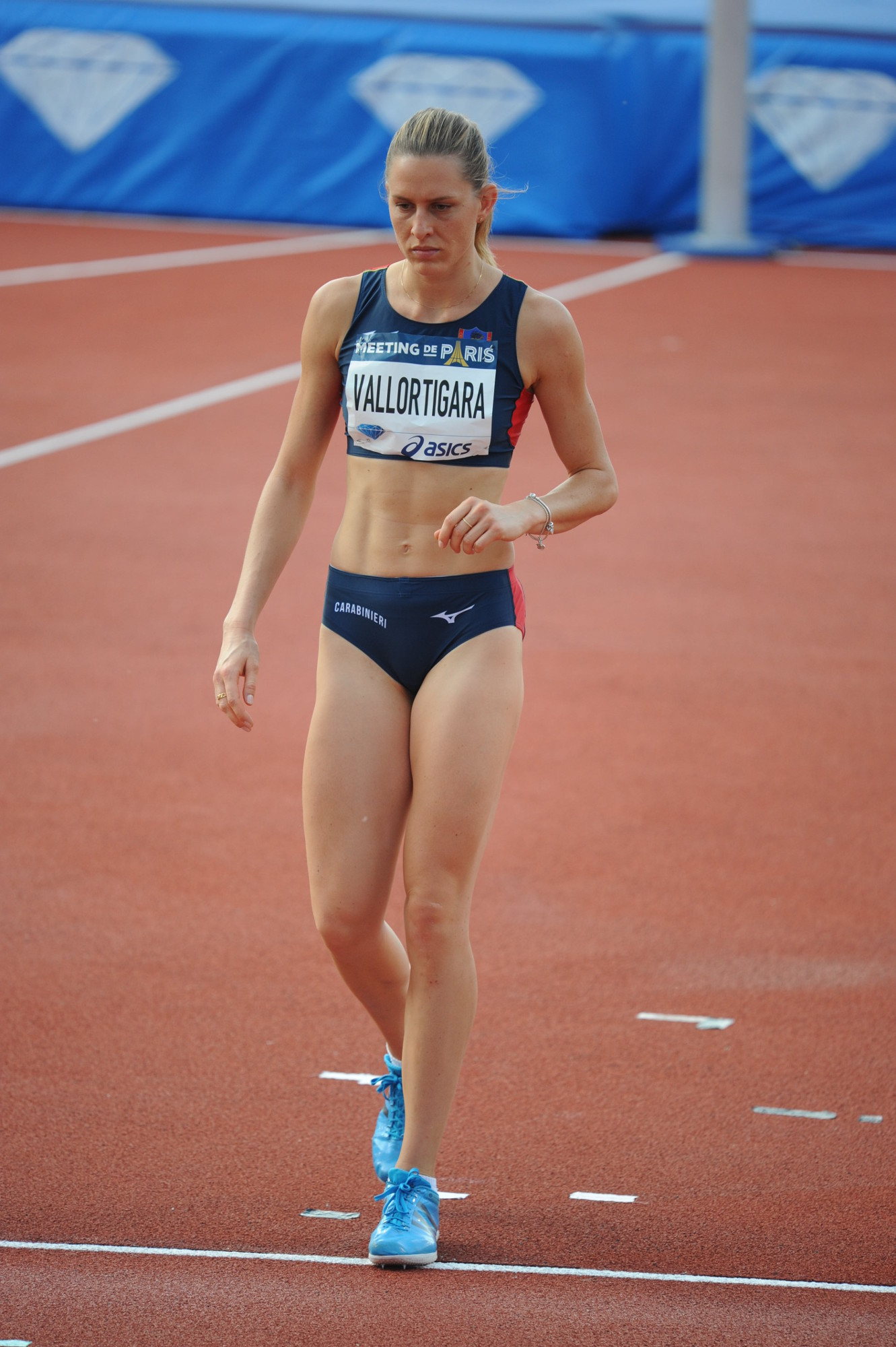
- Elena Vallortigara Meeting de Paris 2018

Personal information
- Nationality: Italian
- Born: 21 September 1991 (age 34) Schio, Italy
- Height: 1.84 m (6 ft 0 in)
- Weight: 68 kg (150 lb)

Sport
- Country: Italy
- Sport: Athletics
- Event: High jump
- Club: C.S. Carabinieri
- Coached by: Stefano Giardi

Achievements and titles
- Personal best: High jump: 2.02 m (2018)
Medal record
Women's athletics
Representing Italy
World Championships
Bronze medal – third place	2022 Eugene	High jump
World U20 Championships
Bronze medal – third place	2010 Moncton	High jump
World U18 Championships
Bronze medal – third place	2007 Ostrava	High jump

Elena Vallortigara (born 21 September 1991) is an Italian high jumper who won the bronze medal at the 2022 World Athletics Championships in Eugene, Oregon.

== Career ==
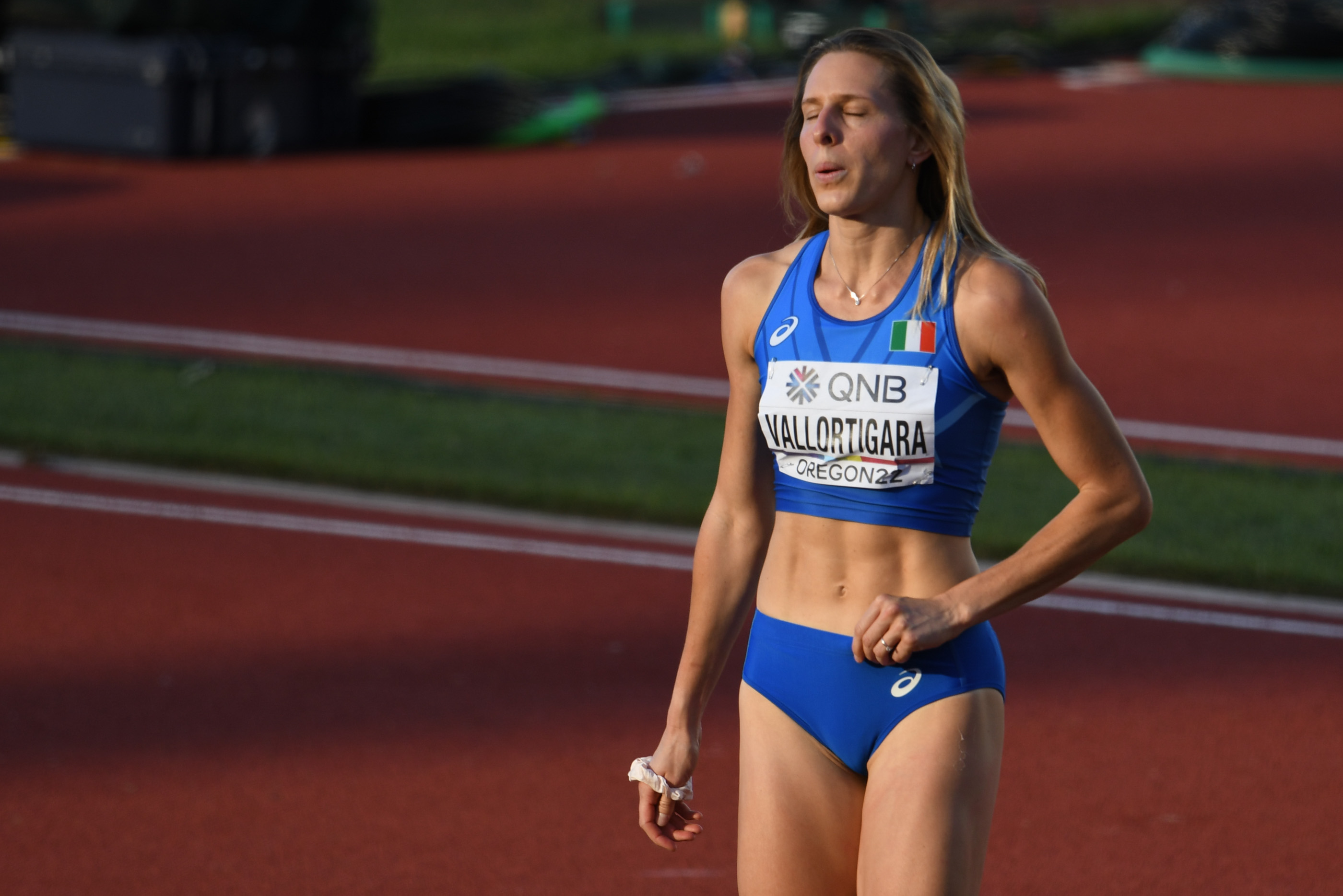
Vallortigara at Oregon22

Vallortigara has won two bronze medals at the youth world level and eight national championship at senior level. She competed at the 2020 Summer Olympics, in High jump.

=== 2018 progression ===
Prior to 2018 Vallortigara had a best of 1.91 m established in 2010 at the age of 18. In 2018 she improved to 2.02 m for the second best performance for the year, behind the 2.04 m of Mariya Lasitskene. During the season she had seven competitions with a result of at least 1.94 m.

Competitions over 1.94 m

Date	Competition	Venue	Position	Measure	Note
25 April	Trofeo della Liberazione	(Italy) Siena	1st	1.94 m	
1 May	Meeting Città di Palmanova	(Italy) Palmanova	1st	1.90 m	
5 May	Regional Championships	(Italy) Caorle	1st	1.95 m	
31 May	Golden Gala Pietro Mennea	(Italy) Rome	3rd	1.94 m	
3 June	FBK Games	(Netherlands) Hengelo	4th	1.91 m	
6 June	Klaverblad High Jump Meeting	(Netherlands) Zoetermeer	1st	1.96 m	
23 June	Italian Athletics Clubs Championships	(Italy) Modena	1st	1.94 m	
30 June	Meeting de Paris	(France) Paris	5th	1.94 m	
18 July	Meeting International d'Athlétisme	(Belgium) Liège	1st	1.91 m	
22 July	London Anniversary Games	(United Kingdom) London	2nd	2.02 m	
9 September	Italian Championships	(Italy) Pescara	1st	1.91 m	

== Personal bests ==
- High jump: 2.02 m ( (United Kingdom) London, 22 July 2018)
- High jump indoor: 1.96 m ( (Italy) Ancona, 23 February 2020)

== Achievements ==
Year	Competition	Venue	Position	Event	Performance	Notes
2018	European Championships	(Germany) Berlin	15th	High jump	1.86 m	
2018	Diamond League		4th	High jump	21 pts	
2019	European Indoor Championships	(United Kingdom) Glasgow	17th	High jump	1.89 m	
2019	World Championships	(Qatar) Doha	17th	High jump	1.90 m	
2021	European Indoor Championships	(Poland) Toruń	14th	High jump	1.87 m	
2022	World Championships	(United States) Eugene	3rd	High jump	2.00 m	SB

== Progression ==
Personal Best
Top 10 World Rank

Year	Age	Outdoor	Indoor	Venue	Date	World Rank
2022	31	2.00 m		(United States) Eugene	19 July	2
2022	31		1.92 m	(Italy) Ancona	27 February	15
2021	30	1.96 m		(France) Sotteville-lès-Rouen	11 July	10
2021	30		1.93 m	(Slovakia) Banská Bystrica	2 February	11
2020	29	1.88 m		(Italy) Padua	30 August	22
2020	29		1.96 m	(Italy) Ancona	23 February	5
2019	28	1.91 m		(Switzerland) Bellinzona	1 September	32
2019	28		1.92 m	(Italy) Ancona	15 February	21
2018	27	2.02 m		(United Kingdom) London	22 July	2
2018	27		1.84 m	(Switzerland) Sainte-Croix	3 February	73
2017	26	1.86 m		(Italy) Catania	16 June	79
2017	26		1.87 m	(Italy) Ancona	18 February	48
2016	25	1.82 m		(Italy) Modena	17 June	159
2016	25		1.83 m	(Italy) Florence	15 February	108
2015	24	1.84 m		(Italy) Cles	28 Augu	126
2015	24		1.86 m	(Italy) Pordenone	31 January	49
2014	23	1.84 m		(Italy) Cles	29 Augu	128
2014	23		1.78 m	(Italy) Padua	11 January	212
2013	22	1.85 m		(Italy) Milan	27 July	108
2013	22		not disputed			
2012	21	1.86 m		(Italy) Misano Adriatico	16 June	105
2012	21		not disputed			
2011	20			injured		
2011	20		1.90 m	(Italy) Padua	29 January	22
2010	19	1.91 m		(France) Annecy	11 September	32
2010	19		1.87 m	(Italy) Ancona	31 January	50
2009	18	1.87 m		(Italy) Milan	2 Augu	70
2009	18		1.72 m	(Italy) Padua	17 January	-
2008	17	1.82 m		(Italy) Chiuro	14 June	161
2008	17		1.85 m	(Italy) Ancona	10 February	61
2007	16	1.86 m		(Serbia) Beograd	26 July	88
2007	16		1.74 m	(Italy) Genoa	24 February	-
2006	15	1.75 m		(Italy) Brixen	4 June	-
2006	15		not disputed			

== National titles ==
Vallortigara has won 10 national championships at individual senior level.

- Italian Athletics Championships
  - High jump: 2018, 2020, 2021, 2022, 2023 (5)
- Italian Indoor Athletics Championships
  - High jump: 2017, 2019, 2020, 2022, 2023 (5)

== See also ==
- Female two metres club
- Italian all-time lists - High jump
