= 2018 IAAF World Indoor Championships – Women's high jump =

Women's high jump at the 2018 IAAF World Indoor Championships
- Venue: Arena Birmingham
- Dates: 1 March
- Competitors: 13 from 10 nations
- Winning height: 2.01

Medalists
gold medal	Mariya Lasitskene	Authorised Neutral Athletes
silver medal	Vashti Cunningham	United States
bronze medal	Alessia Trost	Italy

The women's high jump at the 2018 IAAF World Indoor Championships took place at Arena Birmingham in Birmingham, United Kingdom, on 1 March 2018.

With the pits back to back in the center of the arena and no events on the track, the Women shared center stage with the Men's high jump.

== Summary ==
Russian Mariya Lasitskene, competing as an Authorised Neutral Athlete, led the field of thirteen women that year through her clearance of 2.04 m (6 ft 8 1/4 in) at the Stalingrad Cup. She was the strong favourite, having gone unbeaten since 2016 and as the two-time reigning World Champion outdoors. American Vashti Cunningham returned to defend her title and 2017 World runner-up, Yuliya Levchenko of Ukraine, also entered the event.

The overall performance of the field was poor. Seven athletes were eliminated after clearing the opening height of 1.84 m (6 ft 1/4 in) only. Levchenko and Mirela Demireva of Bulgaria were eliminated next, with three failures at 1.93 m (6 ft 3 3/4 in). Of the remaining four athletes only Lasitskene had achieved a clean scorecard after three heights. She then cleared the following height of 1.96 m (6 ft 5 in), which none of the other athletes managed to achieve, becoming world indoor champion for a second time. The 20-year-old Cunningham took the silver medal by virtue of having only one failure before that height. Alessia Trost of Italy edged out Great Britain's Morgan Lake on countback to win the bronze medal – her first at senior world level. Lasitskene ended the competition on her own, clearing 2.01 m (6 ft 7 in) before three failed attempts at a personal best and the championship record of Stefka Kostadinova (unbeaten since 1987).

== Records ==
Standing records prior to the 2018 IAAF World Indoor Championships
World indoor record	Kajsa Bergqvist (SWE)	2.08	Arnstadt, Germany	4 February 2006
Championship record	Stefka Kostadinova (BUL)	2.05	Indianapolis, United States	8 March 1987
World Leading	Mariya Lasitskene (ANA)	2.04	Volgograd, Russia	27 January 2018

== Results ==
The final was started at 18:45.

Rank	Name	Nationality	1.84	1.89	1.93	1.96	2.01	2.07	Mark	Notes
1st place, gold medalist(s)	Mariya Lasitskene	Authorised Neutral Athletes (ANA)	o	o	o	o	xo	xxx	2.01	
2nd place, silver medalist(s)	Vashti Cunningham	United States (USA)	o	o	xo	xxx			1.93	
3rd place, bronze medalist(s)	Alessia Trost	Italy (ITA)	xo	o	xo	xxx			1.93	SB
4	Morgan Lake	Great Britain (GBR)	xxo	o	xo	xxx			1.93	SB
5	Yuliya Levchenko	Ukraine (UKR)	o	xo	xxx				1.89	
6	Mirela Demireva	Bulgaria (BUL)	o	xxo	xxx				1.89	
7	Erika Kinsey	Sweden (SWE)	o	xxx					1.84	
7	Iryna Gerashchenko	Ukraine (UKR)	o	xxx					1.84	
7	Inika McPherson	United States (USA)	o	xxx					1.84	
10	Sofie Skoog	Sweden (SWE)	xo	xxx					1.84	
10	Michaela Hrubá	Czech Republic (CZE)	xo	xxx					1.84	
10	Levern Spencer	Saint Lucia (LCA)	xo	xxx					1.84	
13	Yorgelis Rodríguez	Cuba (CUB)	xxo	xxx					1.84	
