= Isobel Pooley =

British high jumper

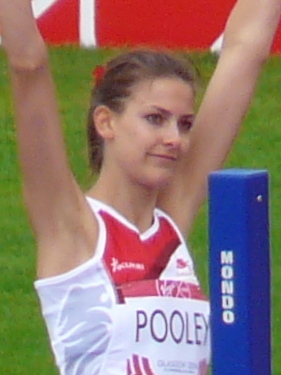
- Pooley at the 2014 Commonwealth Games

Personal information
- Nationality: British
- Born: 21 December 1992 (age 33) London, England
- Education: University of Nottingham
- Height: 192 cm (6 ft 3 ½ in)

Sport
- Country: Great Britain
- Event: High Jump
- Club: Aldershot, Farnham & District AC
- Coached by: Fayyaz Ahmed

Achievements and titles
- Personal best: 1.97 m (6 ft 5 1/2 in) (2015)
Medal record
Representing England
Commonwealth Games
Silver medal – second place	2014 Glasgow	High Jump

Isobel Pooley (born 21 December 1992) is a former British track and field athlete who specialises in the high jump. She won a silver medal at the 2014 Commonwealth Games in Glasgow.

== Career ==
Pooley's first high jump was in the gymnasium at Court Moor School.

As a teenager, Pooley competed at both the World Junior Championships and European Junior Championships, failing to reach the final. In 2012, she improved her best from 1.86m, first to 1.88 m indoors then to 1.90m, which she cleared at the Bedford Games in June. She competed at that year's European Championships in Helsinki, where she was eliminated in the qualifying round with a best of 1.78m. In July 2013, she finished fourth in the final at the European Under 23 Championships in Tampere, clearing 1.90m. A month later, she improved her personal best to 1.91m.

In June 2014 Pooley won the UK Championships with 1.90m. In August she won a silver medal at the Commonwealth Games in Glasgow, with a new best of 1.92m. Three weeks later, she broke the UK outdoor record, when she improved her best by 4 cm to 1.96m in Eberstadt, Germany. The previous UK record of 1.95m had first been set by Diana Davies (then Elliott) in 1982. It was then equalled in 2001 by Susan Moncrieff and again in 2007 by Olympic Heptathlon Champion Jessica Ennis, before Pooley finally surpassed it.

In 2015 Pooley broke the UK outdoor record, and equalled the indoor record set by Katerina Johnson-Thompson earlier in the year, with 1.97m.

Pooley withdrew from the Rio 2016 Olympics selection process due to injury.

She moved to Germany in November 2017 and announced her retirement in September 2018, at the age of 25.

Pooley graduated from the University of Nottingham in 2014 with first class honours. In August 2016 she undertook the Macmillan "Brave the Shave" charity challenge by having her head shaved.

== International competitions ==
Year	Competition	Venue	Position	Notes
Representing Great Britain / England
2010	World Junior Championships	Moncton, Canada	14th (q)	1.78 m
2011	European Junior Championships	Tallinn, Estonia	13th (q)	1.80 m
2012	European Championships	Helsinki, Finland	21st (q)	1.78 m
2013	European U23 Championships	Tampere, Finland	4th	1.90 m
2014	Commonwealth Games	Glasgow, United Kingdom	2nd	1.92 m
2015	European Indoor Championships	Prague, Czech Republic	17th (q)	1.82 m
2015	World Championships	Beijing, China	19th (q)	1.89 m
2016	World Indoor Championships	Portland, Oregon	10th	1.89 m
2016	European Championships	Amsterdam, Netherlands	16th (q)	1.85 m

Note: Results with a q, indicate overall position in qualifying round.

== National titles ==
- English Schools Championships - 2009, 2010
- England Under 20 Championships - 2010, 2011
- England Under 23 Championships - 2013
- UK Championships & trials - 2014, 2015
