= Serena Capponcelli =

Italian athlete

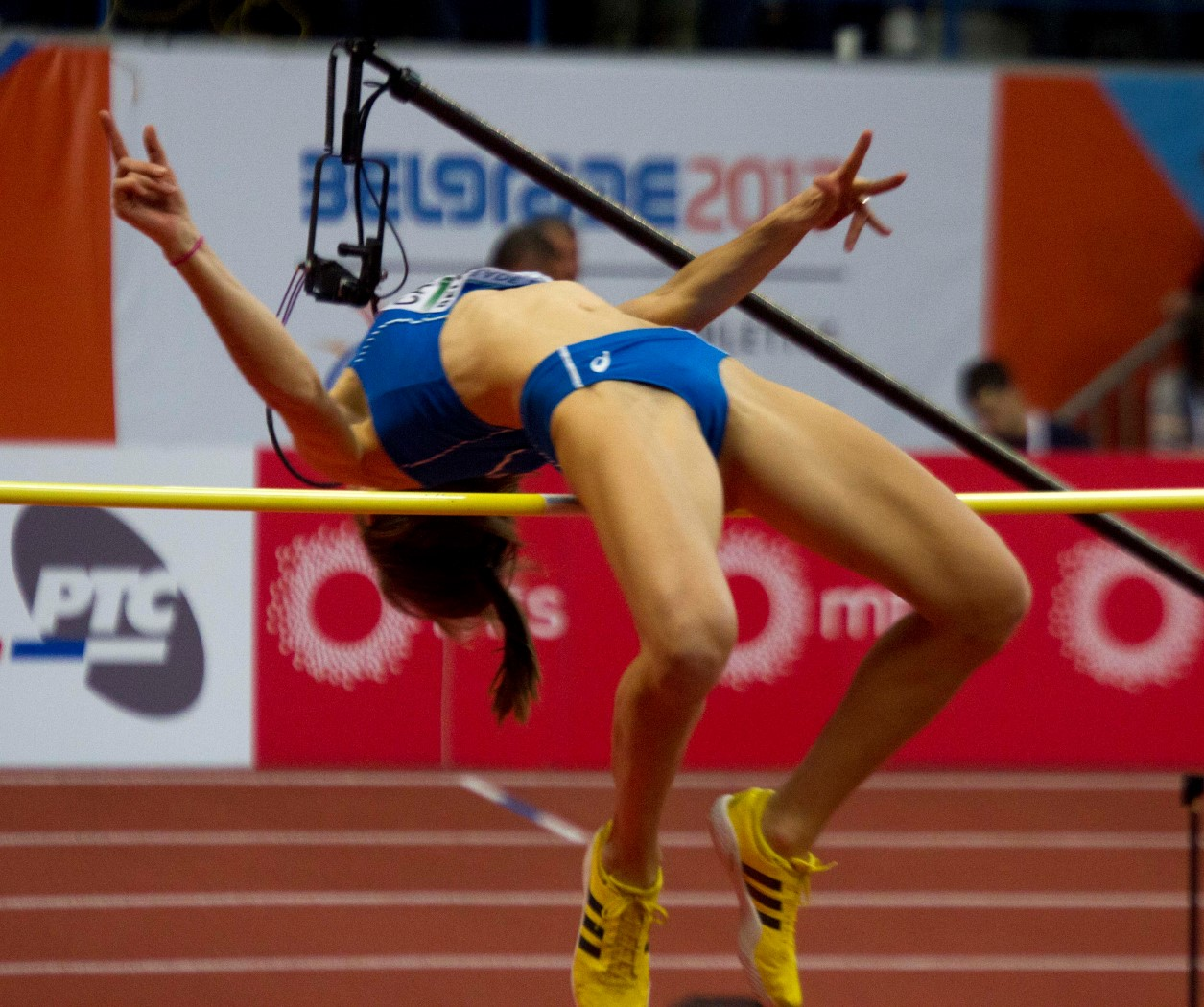

Personal information
- National team: Italy: 2 caps
- Born: 24 January 1989 (age 37) San Giovanni in Persiceto, Italy
- Height: 1.84 m (6 ft 0 in)
- Weight: 73 kg (161 lb)

Sport
- Sport: Athletics; Bobsleigh
- Event(s): High jump Shot put Javelin throw
- Club: Vlierzele Sportief
- Coached by: Stefaan Vanderstichelen

Achievements and titles
- Personal bests: High jump: 1.90 m (2018); Shot put: 15.10 m (2012); Javelin throw: 49.30 m (2012); Heptathlon: 5302 pts (2008)
Medal record
Gymnasiade
Gold medal – first place	2006 Thessaloniki	High jump

Serena Capponcelli (born 24 January 1989) is an Italian female high jumper, shot putter, javelin thrower and former bobsledder, who finished at 20th place in the 2018 indoor seasonal world lists in the high jump.

== Biography ==
In 2011 she started to practice the bob as a pilot, until the Olympic call for the 2014 Winter Games, living in Verbania where she met Arno, Belgian amateur cyclist and long-distance mountain runner; they married in September 2015 in Osmate (Varese). She moved to Belgium, in Lede, resuming practicing the high jump for fun, and on 29 January 2017 in Ghent exceeded the quota of 1.89 improving a personal record (1.87 outdoors) that dated back to 2008.

After her national team debut in 2017, she continued by opening the season in 2018 with a personal record: 1.90 m, made on the occasion of the provincial championships in Ghent. At the end of the indoor season she stopped her high jumping activities for pregnancy; in November 2018, Dennis was born. During 2019, she resumed high jumping, with a seasonal best of 1.80 m.

== Personal best ==
- High jump: 1.90 m (indoor), (Belgium) Ghent, 6 January 2018
- Shot put: 15.10 m (indoor), (Italy) Ancona, 25 February 2018
- Javelin throw: 49.30 m, (Italy) Turin, 26 June 2011

== International results ==
Year	Competition	Venue	Position	Event	Measure	Notes
2017	European Championships	(Serbia) Belgrade	Qual (18th)	High jump	1.86 m	

== National championships ==
Senior

Year	Competition	Venue	Position	Event	Measure	Notes
2007	Italian Indoor Championships	(Italy) Ancona	7th	High jump	1.75 m	
2007	Italian Championships	(Italy) Padua	4th	High jump	1.85 m	PB
2009	Italian Championships	(Italy) Milan	5th	High jump	1.78 m	SB
2010	Italian Indoor Championships	(Italy) Ancona	7th	High jump	1.74 m	
2010	Italian Indoor Championships	(Italy) Ancona	5th	Shot put	13.06 m	
2011	Italian Championships	(Italy) Turin	4th	Shot put	14.37 m	
2011	Italian Championships	(Italy) Turin	5th	Javelin throw	49.30 m	PB
2012	Italian Indoor Championships	(Italy) Ancona	3rd	Shot put	15.10 m	PB
2012	Italian Championships	(Italy) Brixen	4th	High jump	1.80 m	
2012	Italian Championships	(Italy) Brixen	6th	Shot put	13.73 m	
2013	Italian Championships	(Italy) Milan	4th	Shot put	14.29 m	
2013	Italian Championships	(Italy) Milan	6th	Javelin throw	47.89 m	
2014	Italian Indoor Championships	(Italy) Ancona	4th	High jump	1.82 m	SB
2014	Italian Indoor Championships	(Italy) Ancona	4th	Shot put	13.89 m	
2014	Italian Championships	(Italy) Rovereto	4th	High jump	1.82 m	
2014	Italian Championships	(Italy) Rovereto	Final	Javelin throw	DNS	
2017	Italian Indoor Championships	(Italy) Ancona	3rd	High jump	1.81 m	
