= 2016 European Athletics Championships – Women's high jump =

Women's high jump at the European Athletics Championships
- Venue: Olympic Stadium
- Location: Amsterdam
- Dates: 6 July (qualification); 7 July (final)
- Competitors: 26 from 20 nations
- Winning height: 1.98 m

Medalists
gold medal	Ruth Beitia	Spain
silver medal	Mirela Demireva	Bulgaria
bronze medal	Airinė Palšytė	Lithuania

The women's high jump at the 2016 European Athletics Championships took place at the Olympic Stadium on 6 and 7 July.

== Records ==
Standing records prior to the 2016 European Athletics Championships
World record	Stefka Kostadinova (BUL)	2.09 m	Rome, Italy	30 August 1987
European record	Stefka Kostadinova (BUL)	2.09 m	Rome, Italy	30 August 1987
Championship record	Tia Hellebaut (BEL)	2.03 m	Gothenburg, Sweden	9 August 2006
Championship record	Venelina Veneva-Mateeva (BUL)	2.03 m	Gothenburg, Sweden	9 August 2006
Championship record	Blanka Vlašić (CRO)	2.03 m	Barcelona, Spain	1 August 2010
World Leading	Kamila Lićwinko (POL)	1.99 m	Szczecin, Poland	18 June 2016
European Leading	Kamila Lićwinko (POL)	1.99 m	Szczecin, Poland	18 June 2016

== Schedule ==
Date	Time	Round
6 July 2016	11:05	Qualification
7 July 2016	17:30	Final

All times are local times (UTC+2)

== Results ==
=== Qualification ===
Qualification: 1.92 m (Q) or best 12 performances (q)

Rank	Group	Name	Nationality	1.70	1.75	1.80	1.85	1.89	1.92	Result	Note
1	A	Michaela Hrubá	Czech Republic	–	–	o	o	o	o	1.92	Q
1	A	Airinė Palšytė	Lithuania	–	–	o	o	o	o	1.92	Q, SB
3	B	Ruth Beitia	Spain	–	–	–	o	xo	o	1.92	Q
4	B	Mirela Demireva	Bulgaria	–	–	o	o	xo	xxo	1.92	Q
5	A	Marie-Laurence Jungfleisch	Germany	–	–	o	o	o	xx	1.89	q
5	B	Sofie Skoog	Sweden	–	o	o	o	o	xxx	1.89	q
5	A	Barbara Szabó	Hungary	–	–	o	o	o	xx	1.89	q, SB
5	B	Nafissatou Thiam	Belgium	–	–	o	o	o	x–	1.89	q
5	A	Alessia Trost	Italy	–	o	o	o	o	xx	1.89	q
10	A	Oksana Okuneva	Ukraine	–	o	o	o	xo	xx	1.89	q
10	A	Desirée Rossit	Italy	o	o	o	o	xo	xx	1.89	
12	A	Maruša Černjul	Slovenia	–	xo	o	o	xo	xxx	1.89	q
13	B	Linda Sandblom	Finland	–	o	o	xxo	xxo	xxx	1.89	
14	B	Ana Šimić	Croatia	–	–	xo	xxo	xxo	xxx	1.89	
15	A	Yuliya Chumachenko	Ukraine	–	o	o	o	xxx		1.85	
16	B	Erika Furlani	Italy	–	o	xo	o	xxx		1.85	
16	B	Isobel Pooley	Great Britain	–	o	xo	o	xxx		1.85	
18	A	Eleriin Haas	Estonia	–	o	o	xo	xxx		1.85	
18	B	Iryna Herashchenko	Ukraine	–	–	o	xo	xxx		1.85	
18	A	Katarina Mögenburg	Norway	–	o	o	xo	xxx		1.85	
18	B	Marija Vuković	Montenegro	–	o	o	xo	xxx		1.85	
22	A	Erika Kinsey	Sweden	–	o	o	xxo	xxx		1.85	
23	B	Anna Iljuštšenko	Estonia	–	o	o	xxx			1.80	
23	A	Valentina Liashenko	Georgia	o	o	o	xxx			1.80	
25	B	Ma'ayan Shahaf	Israel	o	o	xo	xxx			1.80	
26	B	Claudia Guri	Andorra	o	xxo	xxx				1.75	

=== Final ===
Rank	Name	Nationality	1.84	1.89	1.93	1.96	1.98	2.00	Mark	Note
1st place, gold medalist(s)	Ruth Beitia	Spain	o	o	xo	o	o	xxx	1.98	=SB
2nd place, silver medalist(s)	Mirela Demireva	Bulgaria	o	o	o	o	xxx		1.96	
2nd place, silver medalist(s)	Airinė Palšytė	Lithuania	o	o	o	o	xxx		1.96	SB
4	Nafissatou Thiam	Belgium	o	xo	xo	xxx			1.93	
5	Marie-Laurence Jungfleisch	Germany	o	o	xxo	xxx			1.93	=SB
6	Alessia Trost	Italy	o	o	xxx				1.89	
6	Desirée Rossit	Italy	o	o	xxx				1.89	
6	Oksana Okuneva	Ukraine	o	o	xxx				1.89	
9	Sofie Skoog	Sweden	o	xo	xxx				1.89	
9	Maruša Černjul	Slovenia	o	xo	xxx				1.89	
11	Barbara Szabó	Hungary	xxo	xo	xxx				1.89	=SB
12	Michaela Hrubá	Czech Republic	o	xxx					1.84	
