= Lada Pejchalová =

Czech high jumper (born 1998)

Lada Pejchalová (born 15 November 1998) is a Czech high jumper.

She won the bronze medal at the 2015 World Youth Championships and finished fourth at the 2016 World U20 Championships. She also competed at the 2018 European Championships without reaching the final.

Her personal best jump is 1.90 metres, achieved in July 2016 in Miskolc.
