= Bořitov =

- Municipality
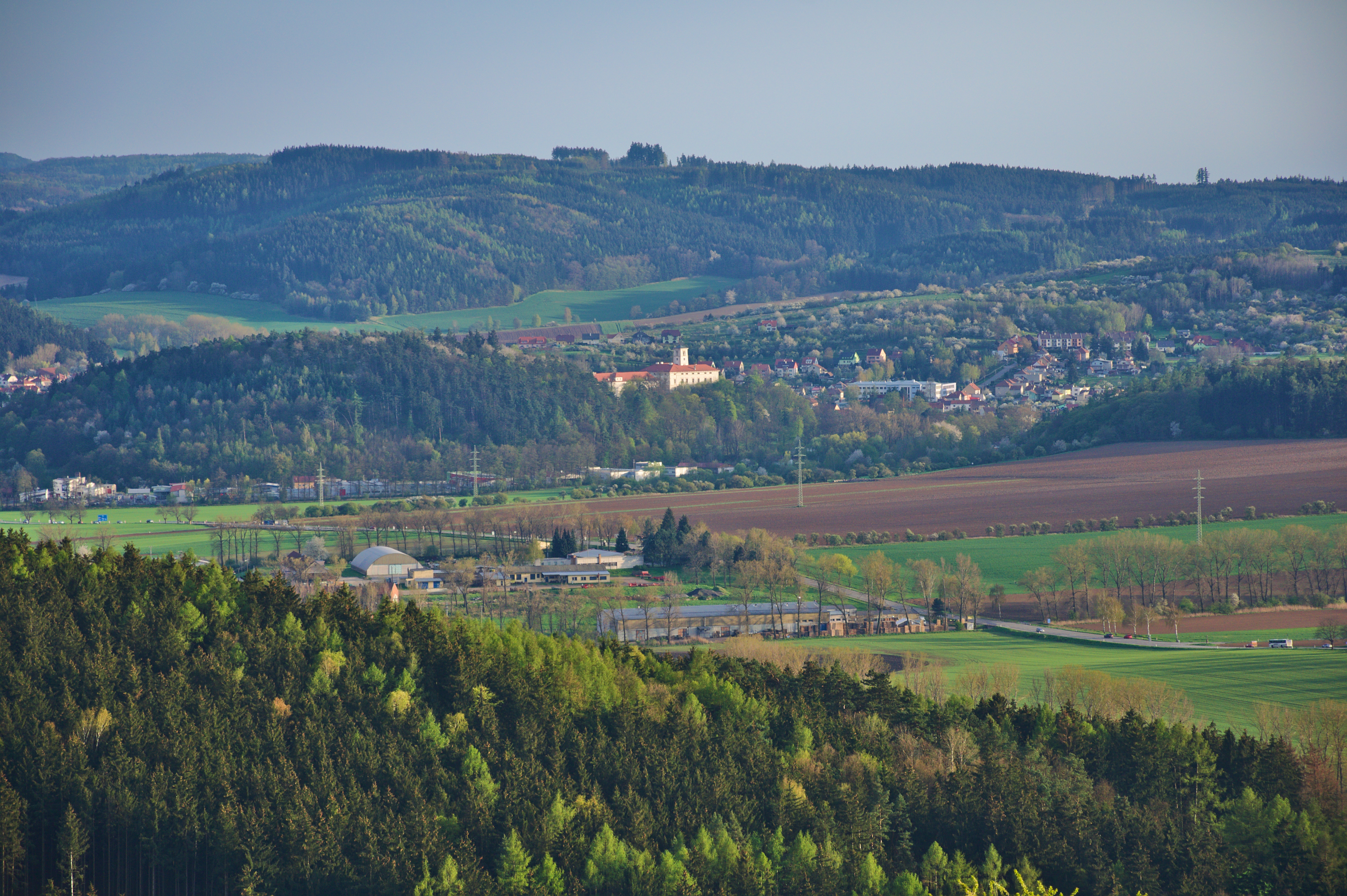
- View from the north

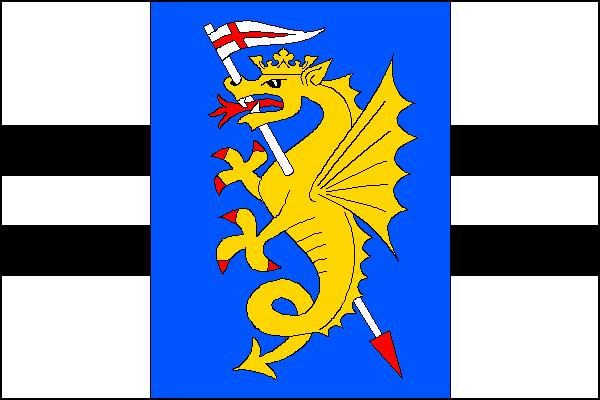
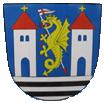
- Flag Coat of arms

- Location in the Czech Republic
- Coordinates: 49°25′30″N 16°35′28″E
- Country: Czech Republic
- Region: South Moravian
- District: Blansko
- First mentioned: 1173

Area
  - Total: 9.98 km^{2} (3.85 sq mi)
- Elevation: 310 m (1,020 ft)

Population (2026-01-01)
  - Total: 1,290
  - Density: 129/km^{2} (335/sq mi)
- Time zone: UTC+1 (CET)
  - Summer (DST): UTC+2 (CEST)
- Postal code: 679 21
- Website: www.boritov.cz

Bořitov is a municipality and village in Blansko District in the South Moravian Region of the Czech Republic. It has about 1,300 inhabitants.

Bořitov lies approximately 9 kilometres (6 mi) north-west of Blansko, 26 km (16 mi) north of Brno, and 173 km (107 mi) south-east of Prague.

== Demographics ==
Historical population
Year	Pop.	±%
1869	910	—
1880	971	+6.7%
1890	1,032	+6.3%
1900	1,086	+5.2%
1910	1,126	+3.7%
1921	1,260	+11.9%
1930	1,310	+4.0%
1950	1,217	−7.1%
1961	1,243	+2.1%
1970	1,187	−4.5%
1980	1,222	+2.9%
1991	1,211	−0.9%
2001	1,224	+1.1%
2011	1,273	+4.0%
2021	1,228	−3.5%
Source: Censuses

== Notable people ==
- Michaela Hrubá (born 1998), athlete
