= 2019 European Athletics Indoor Championships – Women's high jump =

The women's high jump event at the 2019 European Athletics Indoor Championships was held on 1 March at 19:00 (qualification) and 3 March at 19:15 (final) local time.

== Medalists ==
Gold	Silver	Bronze
Mariya Lasitskene; Authorised Neutral Athletes	Yuliya Levchenko; Ukraine	Airinė Palšytė; Lithuania

== Records ==
Standing records prior to the 2019 European Athletics Indoor Championships
World record	Kajsa Bergqvist (SWE)	2.08	Arnstadt, Germany	4 February 2006
European record	Kajsa Bergqvist (SWE)	2.08	Arnstadt, Germany	4 February 2006
Championship record	Tia Hellebaut (BEL)	2.05	Birmingham, Great Britain	3 March 2005
World Leading	Mariya Lasitskene (ANA)	2.04	Moscow, Russia	3 February 2019
European Leading	Mariya Lasitskene (ANA)	2.04	Moscow, Russia	3 February 2019

== Results ==
=== Qualification ===
Qualification: Qualifying performance 1.96 (Q) or at least 8 best performers (q) advance to the Final

Rank	Group	Athlete	Nationality	1.75	1.81	1.85	1.89	1.93	Result	Note
1	B	Mariya Lasitskene	Authorised Neutral Athletes	–	–	o	o	xo	1.93	q
1	B	Yuliya Levchenko	Ukraine	–	o	o	o	xo	1.93	q
3	A	Erika Kinsey	Sweden	o	o	xo	xxo	xo	1.93	q, =PB
4	B	Airinė Palšytė	Lithuania	–	o	o	o	xxo	1.93	q
5	B	Morgan Lake	Great Britain	–	o	xo	o	xxo	1.93	q
5	B	Kateryna Tabashnyk	Ukraine	–	o	xo	o	xxo	1.93	q
7	A	Maruša Černjul	Slovenia	o	o	o	o	xxx	1.89	q
7	A	Iryna Herashchenko	Ukraine	–	o	o	o	xxx	1.89	q
7	B	Michaela Hrubá	Czech Republic	o	o	o	o	xxx	1.89	q
7	A	Imke Onnen	Germany	–	o	o	o	xxx	1.89	q
7	A	Daniela Stanciu	Romania	–	o	o	o	xxx	1.89	q
7	A	Karina Taranda	Belarus	–	o	o	o	xxx	1.89	q
13	A	Marija Vuković	Montenegro	o	xo	xo	o	xxx	1.89	
14	B	Tonje Angelsen	Norway	o	o	o	xo	xxx	1.89	
14	A	Sofie Skoog	Sweden	o	o	o	xo	xxx	1.89	
16	B	Prisca Duvernay	France	o	xxo	o	xo	xxx	1.89	
17	A	Elena Vallortigara	Italy	o	xo	xxo	xxo	xxx	1.89	
18	B	Ana Šimić	Croatia	–	o	o	x-	xx	1.85	
18	B	Alessia Trost	Italy	o	o	o	xxx		1.85	
20	B	Salome Lang	Switzerland	o	o	xo	xxx		1.85	
20	A	Claire Orcel	Belgium	o	o	xo	xxx		1.85	
20	B	Bianca Salming	Sweden	o	o	xo	xxx		1.85	
23	A	Tatiana Gousin	Greece	–	xo	xxo	xxx		1.85	
23	B	Jessica Kähärä	Finland	xo	o	xxo	xxx		1.85	
25	A	Ella Junnila	Finland	xxo	o	xxo	xxx		1.85	
26	A	Sommer Lecky	Ireland	o	xxx				1.75	

=== Final ===
Rank	Athlete	Nationality	1.79	1.83	1.87	1.91	1.94	1.97	1.99	2.01	2.05	Result	Note
1st place, gold medalist(s)	Mariya Lasitskene	Authorised Neutral Athletes	–	–	o	o	o	o	o	xo	xxx	2.01	
2nd place, silver medalist(s)	Yuliya Levchenko	Ukraine	o	o	o	o	o	o	xo	xxx		1.99	
3rd place, bronze medalist(s)	Airinė Palšytė	Lithuania	o	o	o	o	o	o	xxx			1.97	
4	Kateryna Tabashnyk	Ukraine	–	o	o	o	o	xxo	xxx			1.97	
5	Iryna Herashchenko	Ukraine	–	o	o	o	xo	xxx				1.94	
6	Michaela Hrubá	Czech Republic	o	o	xo	o	xxo	xxx				1.94	SB
7	Erika Kinsey	Sweden	o	o	o	o	xxx					1.91	
7	Imke Onnen	Germany	o	o	o	o	xxx					1.91	
9	Morgan Lake	Great Britain	–	o	o	xxo	xxx					1.91	
10	Maruša Černjul	Slovenia	o	o	xxo	xxo	xxx					1.91	PB
11	Daniela Stanciu	Romania	–	o	o	xxx						1.87	
12	Karina Taranda	Belarus	o	o	xo	xxx						1.87	
