= 2017 European Athletics U23 Championships – Women's high jump =

The women's high jump event at the 2017 European Athletics U23 Championships was held in Bydgoszcz, Poland, at Zdzisław Krzyszkowiak Stadium on 14 and 16 July.

== Medalists ==
Gold	Yuliya Levchenko; Ukraine
Silver	Iryna Herashchenko; Ukraine
Bronze	Erika Furlani; Italy

== Results ==
=== Qualification ===
14 July

Qualification rule: 1.82 (Q) or the 12 best results (q) qualified for the final.

Rank	Group	Name	Nationality	1.60	1.65	1.70	1.75	1.79	Results	Notes
1	A	Kadriye Aydın	Turkey	–	–	o	o	o	1.79	q
1	A	Erika Furlani	Italy	–	–	–	o	o	1.79	q
1	A	Iryna Herashchenko	Ukraine	–	–	–	–	o	1.79	q
1	A	Anne Klebsch	Germany	–	–	o	o	o	1.79	q
1	A	Liliya Klintsova	Ukraine	–	–	–	o	o	1.79	q
1	A	Salome Lang	Switzerland	–	–	o	o	o	1.79	q
1	B	Elina Kakko	Finland	–	o	o	o	o	1.79	q
1	B	Yuliya Levchenko	Ukraine	–	–	–	–	o	1.79	q
1	B	Maryia Zhodzik	Belarus	–	–	–	o	o	1.79	q
10	B	Saleta Fernández	Spain	–	o	o	xxo	o	1.79	q
11	A	Lisanne Hagens	Netherlands	–	–	o	xo	xxo	1.79	q
12	B	Laura Salin-Eyike	France	–	–	xo	o	xxx	1.75	q
13	A	Gabriela Kosonen	Finland	–	o	o	xxo	xxx	1.75	
14	B	Caroline Fleischer	Norway	o	o	o	xxx		1.70	
15	B	Esmanur Alkaç	Turkey	–	–	xo	xxx		1.70	
15	B	Ellen Ekholm	Sweden	–	o	xo	xxx		1.70	

=== Final ===
16 July

Rank	Name	Nationality	1.68	1.72	1.76	1.79	1.82	1.84	1.86	1.88	1.92	1.94	1.96	1.98	Result	Notes
1st place, gold medalist(s)	Yuliya Levchenko	Ukraine	–	–	–	o	–	o	o	o	o	o	o	xxx	1.96	=EL
2nd place, silver medalist(s)	Iryna Herashchenko	Ukraine	–	–	–	o	–	o	o	o	xo	xxx			1.92	
3rd place, bronze medalist(s)	Erika Furlani	Italy	–	–	o	o	o	xxo	o	xxx					1.86	
4	Salome Lang	Switzerland	–	o	o	o	o	o	xxo	xxx					1.86	=PB
5	Maryia Zhodzik	Belarus	–	–	–	xo	xo	o	xxo	xxx					1.86	=PB
6	Liliya Klintsova	Ukraine	–	–	o	o	–	o	xxx						1.84	
7	Anne Klebsch	Germany	–	–	o	xo	xxo	xxx							1.82	
8	Lisanne Hagens	Netherlands	–	o	o	o	xxx								1.79	
9	Elina Kakko	Finland	o	o	xo	o	xxx								1.79	
10	Kadriye Aydın	Turkey	o	o	o	xxx									1.76	
11	Saleta Fernández	Spain	o	o	xo	xxx									1.76	
11	Laura Salin-Eyike	France	–	o	xo	xxx									1.76	
