= Yuliya Levchenko =

Ukrainian high jumper (born 1997)

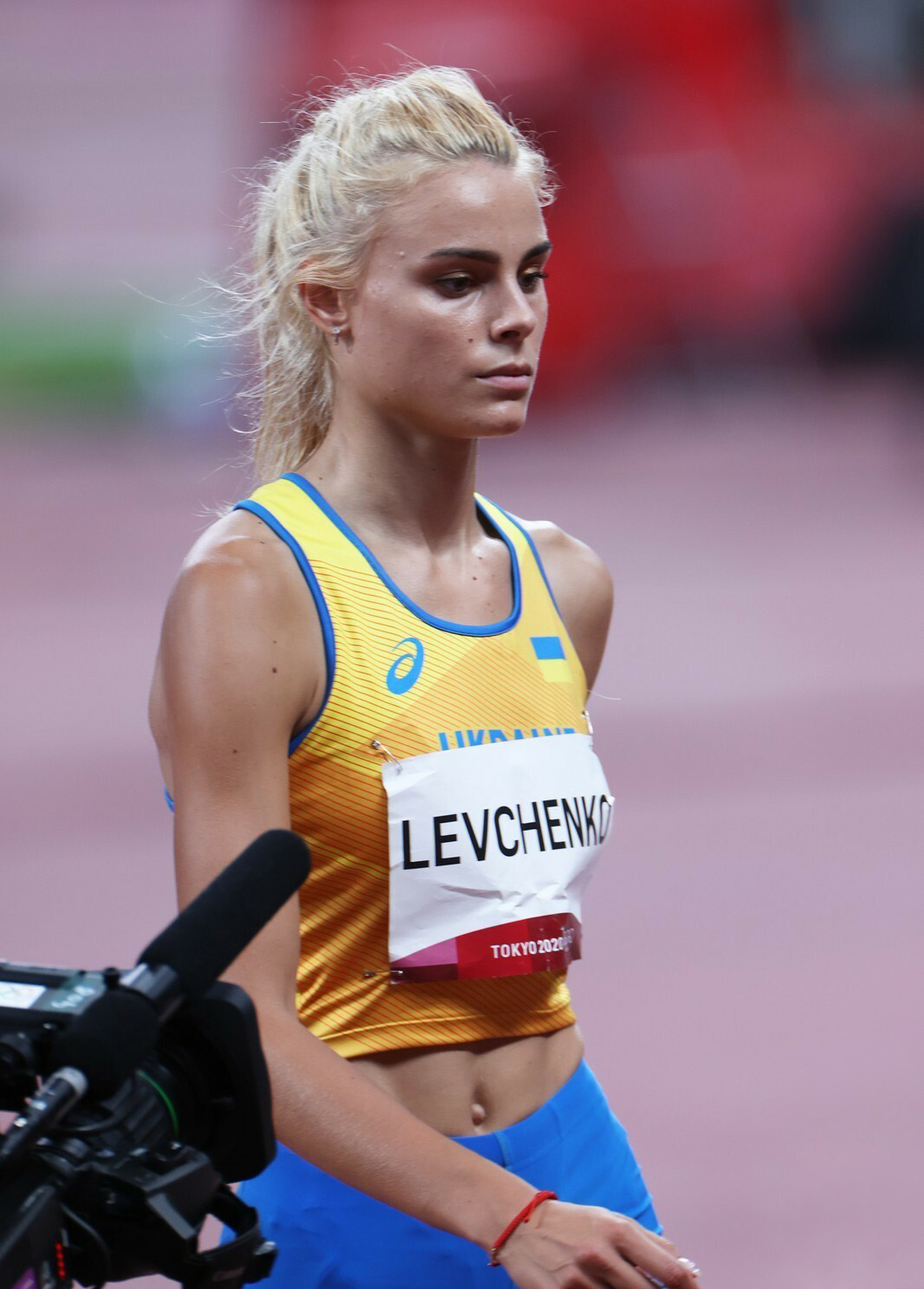
- Levchenko at the 2020 Tokyo Olympics

Personal information
- Full name: Yuliya Andriyivna Levchenko
- Born: 28 November 1997 (age 28) Bakhmut, Donetsk Oblast, Ukraine
- Height: 1.79 m (5 ft 10 in)
- Weight: 60 kg (132 lb)

Sport
- Country: Ukraine
- Sport: Athletics
- Event: High jump

Achievements and titles
- Personal bests: 2.02 m (6 ft 7 1/2 in) (Minsk 2019); Indoors; 2.00 m (6 ft 6 1/2 in) (Eaubonne 2019)
Medal record
Women's athletics
Representing Ukraine
World Championships
Silver medal – second place	2017 London	High jump
World Indoor Championships
Silver medal – second place	2026 Toruń	High jump
Diamond League
Second place	2017	High jump
Second place	2018	High jump
Second place	2019	High jump
European Indoor Championships
Silver medal – second place	2019 Glasgow	High jump
Bronze medal – third place	2017 Belgrade	High jump
European Team Championships
Gold medal – first place	2019 Bydgoszcz	High jump
Military World Games
Silver medal – second place	2019 Wuhan	High jump
European U23 Championships
Gold medal – first place	2017 Bydgoszcz	High jump
Gold medal – first place	2019 Gävle	High jump
World U20 Championships
Bronze medal – third place	2016 Bydgoszcz	High jump
Youth Olympic Games
Gold medal – first place	2014 Nanjing	High jump

Yuliya Andriyivna Levchenko or Yuliia Andriivna Levchenko (Ukrainian: Юлія Андріївна Левченко, pronounced [ˈjul⁽ʲ⁾ijɐ leu̯ˈtʃɛnko]; born 28 November 1997) is a Ukrainian high jumper. She won the silver medal at the 2017 World Championships in Athletics. Indoors at European level, Levchenko claimed bronze in 2017 and silver in 2019. She was the 2017 European Under-23 champion.

Levchenko earned gold at the 2014 Youth Olympics and bronze at the 2016 World U20 Championships. She won five Ukrainian national titles.

== Career ==
Yuliya Levchenko competed in the high jump at the 2016 Olympics Games in Rio de Janeiro, where she did not reach the final.

She was the 2017 European Under-23 Championships gold medalist and the 2017 World Championships silver medalist. She was ranked second in the world for the 2017 season. Also in 2017, she was named the European Athletics Rising Star of the Year.

Levchenko competed at the postponed 2020 Tokyo Olympics in 2021, where she finished eighth.

Her personal bests in the high jump are 2.02 metres outdoors (Minsk 2019) and 2.00 metres indoors (Eaubonne 2019).

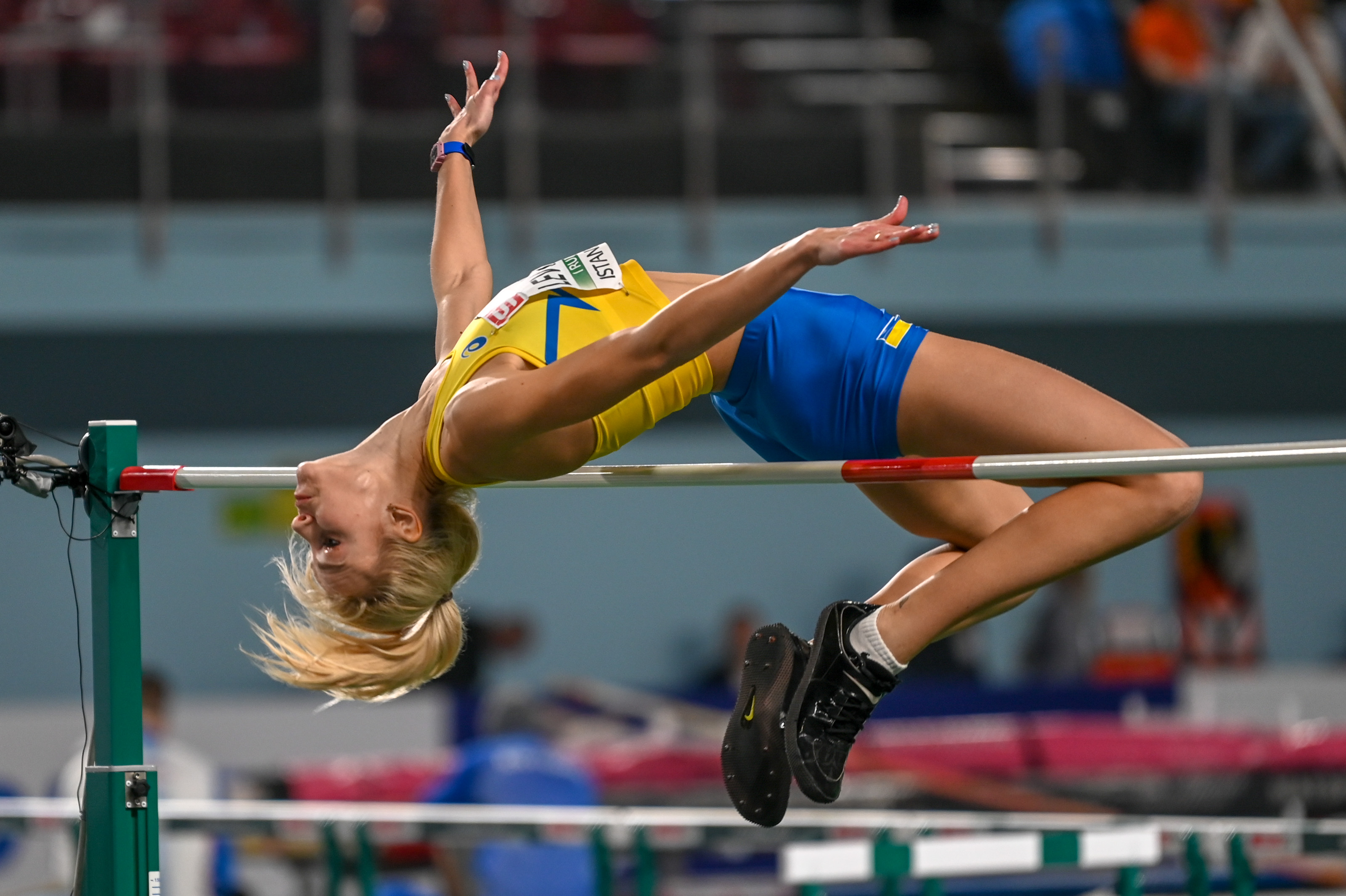
Levchenko jumps at the 2023 European Indoor Championships in Istanbul.

== Statistics ==
=== International competitions ===
Representing Ukraine
Year	Competition	Venue	Position	Notes
2013	World Youth Championships	Donetsk, Ukraine	13th	1.70 m
2014	Youth Olympic Games	Nanjing, China	1st	1.89 m
2015	World Championships	Beijing, China	24th (q)	1.85 m
2016	World U20 Championships	Bydgoszcz, Poland	3rd	1.86 m
2016	Olympic Games	Rio de Janeiro, Brazil	19th (q)	1.92 m
2017	European Indoor Championships	Belgrade, Serbia	3rd	1.94 m
2017	European U23 Championships	Bydgoszcz, Poland	1st	1.96 m
2017	World Championships	London, United Kingdom	2nd	2.01 m
2018	World Indoor Championships	Birmingham, United Kingdom	5th	1.89 m
2018	European Championships	Berlin, Germany	9th	1.91 m
2019	European Indoor Championships	Glasgow, United Kingdom	2nd	1.99 m
2019	World Championships	Doha, Qatar	4th	2.00 m
2021	European Indoor Championships	Toruń, Poland	4th	1.94 m
2021	Olympic Games	Tokyo, Japan	8th	1.96 m
2022	World Championships	Eugene, United States	15th (q)	1.90 m
2022	European Championships	Munich, Germany	9th	1.86 m
2023	European Indoor Championships	Istanbul, Turkey	5th	1.94 m
2023	World Championships	Budapest, Hungary	17th (q)	1.89 m
2024	World Indoor Championships	Glasgow, United Kingdom	9th	1.84 m
2024	European Championships	Rome, Italy	23rd (q)	1.81 m
2024	Olympic Games	Paris, France	— (q)	NM
2025	World Championships	Tokyo, Japan	5th	1.97 m
2026	World Indoor Championships	Toruń, Poland	2nd	1.99 m
2026	World Ultimate Championship	Budapest, Hungary	6th	1.86 m

=== National titles ===
- Ukrainian Athletics Championships
  - High jump: 2018, 2019
- Ukrainian Indoor Athletics Championships
  - High jump: 2018, 2019, 2023
