= 2018 European Athletics Championships – Women's high jump =

Women's high jump at the 2018 European Athletics Championships
- Venue: Olympic Stadium
- Location: Berlin
- Dates: August 8 (qualification); August 10 (final)
- Competitors: 25 from 16 nations
- Winning height: 2.00

Medalists
gold medal	Mariya Lasitskene; Authorised Neutral Athletes
silver medal	Mirela Demireva; Bulgaria
bronze medal	Marie-Laurence Jungfleisch; Germany

The women's high jump at the 2018 European Athletics Championships took place at the Olympic Stadium on 8 and 10 August.

== Records ==
Standing records prior to the 2018 European Athletics Championships
World record	Stefka Kostadinova (BUL)	2.09 m	Rome, Italy	30 August 1987
European record	Stefka Kostadinova (BUL)	2.09 m	Rome, Italy	30 August 1987
Championship record	Tia Hellebaut (BEL)	2.03 m	Gothenburg, Sweden	9 August 2006
Championship record	Venelina Veneva-Mateeva (BUL)	2.03 m	Gothenburg, Sweden	9 August 2006
Championship record	Blanka Vlašić (CRO)	2.03 m	Barcelona, Spain	1 August 2010
World Leading	Mariya Lasitskene (ANA)	2.04 m	Paris, France	30 June 2018
European Leading	Mariya Lasitskene (ANA)	2.04 m	London, Great Britain	22 July 2018

== Schedule ==
Date	Time	Round
8 August 2018	19:25	Qualification
10 August 2018	19:22	Final

All times are local times (UTC+2)

== Results ==
=== Qualification ===
Qualification: 1.92 m (Q) or best 12 performances (q)

Rank	Group	Name	Nationality	1.76	1.81	1.86	1.90	Result	Notes
1	A	Mirela Demireva	Bulgaria	–	–	o	o	1.90	q
1	B	Marie-Laurence Jungfleisch	Germany	–	o	o	o	1.90	q
1	B	Morgan Lake	Great Britain	–	o	o	o	1.90	q
1	B	Mariya Lasitskene	Authorised Neutral Athletes	–	o	o	o	1.90	q
1	B	Airinė Palšytė	Lithuania	–	o	o	o	1.90	q
1	B	Kateryna Tabashnyk	Ukraine	–	o	o	o	1.90	q
7	A	Imke Onnen	Germany	–	o	o	xo	1.90	q
7	A	Ana Šimić	Croatia	–	o	o	xo	1.90	q
9	A	Erika Kinsey	Sweden	o	o	o	xxo	1.90	q
9	A	Yuliya Levchenko	Ukraine	–	o	o	xxo	1.90	q
9	A	Alessia Trost	Italy	o	o	o	xxo	1.90	q
12	B	Michaela Hrubá	Czech Republic	o	o	o	xxx	1.86	q
12	A	Oksana Okunyeva	Ukraine	o	o	o	xxx	1.86	q
12	B	Karina Taranda	Belarus	o	o	o	xxx	1.86	q
15	B	Elena Vallortigara	Italy	o	o	xo	xxx	1.86	
16	B	Sofie Skoog	Sweden	–	xo	xo	xxx	1.86	
17	A	Ella Junnila	Finland	xo	o	xxo	xxx	1.86	
18	A	Nikki Manson	Great Britain	o	o	xxx		1.81	
18	A	Lada Pejchalová	Czech Republic	o	o	xxx		1.81	
18	A	Desirée Rossit	Italy	o	o	xxx		1.81	
18	B	Daniela Stanciu	Romania	o	o	xxx		1.81	
18	B	Marija Vuković	Montenegro	–	o	xxx		1.81	
23	A	Claire Orcel	Belgium	xo	o	xxr		1.81	
24	B	Tonje Angelsen	Norway	o	xxo	xxr		1.81	
25	A	Eleriin Haas	Estonia	o	xxx			1.76	

=== Final ===
Rank	Name	Nationality	1.82	1.87	1.91	1.94	1.96	1.98	2.00	2.02	2.04	Result	Notes
1st place, gold medalist(s)	Mariya Lasitskene	Authorised Neutral Athletes	–	o	o	o	xo	o	xo	–	xxx	2.00	
2nd place, silver medalist(s)	Mirela Demireva	Bulgaria	–	o	o	xo	–	–	xxo	–	xxx	2.00	=PB
3rd place, bronze medalist(s)	Marie-Laurence Jungfleisch	Germany	o	o	o	o	o	xxx				1.96	=SB
4	Airinė Palšytė	Lithuania	o	xo	o	o	xo	xxx				1.96	SB
5	Kateryna Tabashnyk	Ukraine	o	o	o	o	xxx					1.94	
6	Michaela Hrubá	Czech Republic	o	xxo	o	xxx						1.91	SB
7	Morgan Lake	Great Britain	o	o	xo	xxx						1.91	
8	Alessia Trost	Italy	o	o	xxo	xxx						1.91	=SB
9	Yuliya Levchenko	Ukraine	o	xo	xxo	xxx						1.91	
10	Oksana Okunyeva	Ukraine	o	o	xxx							1.87	
10	Ana Šimić	Croatia	o	o	xxx							1.87	
12	Karina Taranda	Belarus	xo	xo	xxx							1.87	
13	Erika Kinsey	Sweden	o	xxo	xxx							1.87	
14	Imke Onnen	Germany	xxo	xxx								1.82	
