= 2013 European Athletics U23 Championships – Women's high jump =

The Women's high jump event at the 2013 European Athletics U23 Championships was held in Tampere, Finland, at Ratina Stadium on 11 and 13 July.

== Medalists ==
Gold	Alessia Trost; Italy
Silver	Airinė Palšytė; Lithuania
Bronze	Oksana Krasnokutskaya; Russia

== Results ==
=== Final ===
13 July 2013

Rank	Name	Nationality	Attempts										Result	Notes
Rank	Name	Nationality	1.71	1.76	1.80	1.84	1.87	1.90	1.92	1.94	1.96	1.98	Result	Notes
1st place, gold medalist(s)	Alessia Trost	Italy	-	o	o	o	o	xxo	o	o	-	xxo	1.98	=CUR
2nd place, silver medalist(s)	Airinė Palšytė	Lithuania	o	o	o	o	o	o	o	xx-	x		1.92	=SB
3rd place, bronze medalist(s)	Oksana Krasnokutskaya	Russia	o	o	xo	xo	o	o	xxx				1.90	=PB
4	Isobel Pooley	United Kingdom	-	o	o	o	xo	xxo	xxx				1.90	=PB
5	Nele Hollmann	Germany	o	o	o	o	o	xxx					1.87	PB
6	Eleriin Haas	Estonia	-	o	o	o	xo	xxx					1.87	SB
7	Hanne Van Hessche	Belgium	o	o	xo	o	xo	xxx					1.87	=PB
8	Chiara Vitobello	Italy	o	o	o	o	xxo	xxx					1.87	SB
9	Anastasiya Andreeva	Russia	-	o	o	o	xxx						1.84	
10	Sietske Noorman	Netherlands	o	o	o	xo	xxx						1.84	=SB
11	Valeryia Bahdanovich	Belarus	-	o	o	xxx							1.80	
11	Agnieszka Borowska	Poland	o	o	o	xxx							1.80	
11	Senni Ronkainen	Finland	o	o	o	xxx							1.80	=SB

=== Qualifications ===
Qualified: qualifying perf. 1.86 (Q) or 12 best performers (q) advance to the Final

==== Summary ====
Rank	Name	Nationality	Result	Notes
1	Eleriin Haas	Estonia	1.84	q
1	Airinė Palšytė	Lithuania	1.84	q
1	Alessia Trost	Italy	1.84	q
4	Valeryia Bahdanovich	Belarus	1.84	q
4	Nele Hollmann	Germany	1.84	q
4	Sietske Noorman	Netherlands	1.84	q SB
4	Isobel Pooley	United Kingdom	1.84	q
4	Hanne Van Hessche	Belgium	1.84	q =SB
9	Anastasiya Andreeva	Russia	1.84	q
10	Oksana Krasnokutskaya	Russia	1.84	q
11	Agnieszka Borowska	Poland	1.84	q
11	Senni Ronkainen	Finland	1.84	q PB
11	Chiara Vitobello	Italy	1.84	q
14	Patricia Bihari	Hungary	1.82	PB
15	Victoria Dronsfield	Sweden	1.82	
15	Michalina Kwaśniewska	Poland	1.82	
15	Magdaléna Nová	Czech Republic	1.82	
18	Ekateríni Kiriakopoúlou	Greece	1.80	
19	Claudia García	Spain	1.80	=SB
20	Taisiya Roslava	Belarus	1.80	
21	Cristina Ferrando	Spain	1.77	
21	Nadja Kampschulte	Germany	1.77	
23	Katarina Mögenburg	Norway	1.77	

==== Details ====
===== Group A =====
11 July 2013 / 13:00

Rank	Name	Nationality	Attempts						Result	Notes
Rank	Name	Nationality	1.69	1.73	1.77	1.80	1.82	1.84	Result	Notes
1	Eleriin Haas	Estonia	-	o	o	o	o	o	1.84	q
1	Alessia Trost	Italy	-	o	o	o	o	o	1.84	q
3	Valeryia Bahdanovich	Belarus	-	-	o	xo	o	o	1.84	q
3	Hanne Van Hessche	Belgium	-	o	o	xo	o	o	1.84	q =SB
5	Anastasiya Andreeva	Russia	-	o	o	o	xxo	o	1.84	q
6	Agnieszka Borowska	Poland	-	o	o	xo	xo	xo	1.84	q
6	Senni Ronkainen	Finland	-	xo	o	xo	o	xo	1.84	q PB
8	Patricia Bihari	Hungary	o	o	o	o	o	xxx	1.82	PB
9	Ekateríni Kiriakopoúlou	Greece	-	o	o	o	xxx		1.80	
10	Claudia García	Spain	o	o	o	xo	xxx		1.80	=SB
11	Nadja Kampschulte	Germany	o	o	o	xxx			1.77	

===== Group B =====
11 July 2013 / 13:00

Rank	Name	Nationality	Attempts						Result	Notes
Rank	Name	Nationality	1.69	1.73	1.77	1.80	1.82	1.84	Result	Notes
1	Airinė Palšytė	Lithuania	-	o	o	o	o	o	1.84	q
2	Nele Hollmann	Germany	o	o	xo	o	o	o	1.84	q
2	Sietske Noorman	Netherlands	-	o	o	xo	o	o	1.84	q SB
2	Isobel Pooley	United Kingdom	-	o	o	xo	-	o	1.84	q
5	Oksana Krasnokutskaya	Russia	o	o	o	o	o	xo	1.84	q
6	Chiara Vitobello	Italy	o	o	o	xo	xo	xo	1.84	q
7	Victoria Dronsfield	Sweden	-	o	o	xo	o	xxx	1.82	
7	Michalina Kwaśniewska	Poland	o	o	o	xo	o	xxx	1.82	
7	Magdaléna Nová	Czech Republic	-	xo	o	o	o	xxx	1.82	
10	Taisiya Roslava	Belarus	-	xo	o	xo	xxx		1.80	
11	Cristina Ferrando	Spain	o	o	o	xxx			1.77	
12	Katarina Mögenburg	Norway	xo	o	xxo	xxx			1.77	

== Participation ==
According to an unofficial count, 23 athletes from 17 countries participated in the event.

- Belarus (2)
- Belgium (1)
- Czech Republic (1)
- Estonia (1)
- Finland (1)
- Germany (2)
- Greece (1)
- Hungary (1)
- Italy (2)
- Lithuania (1)
- Netherlands (1)
- Norway (1)
- Poland (2)
- Russia (2)
- Spain (2)
- Sweden (1)
- United Kingdom (1)
