= Eleriin Haas =

Estonian high jumper

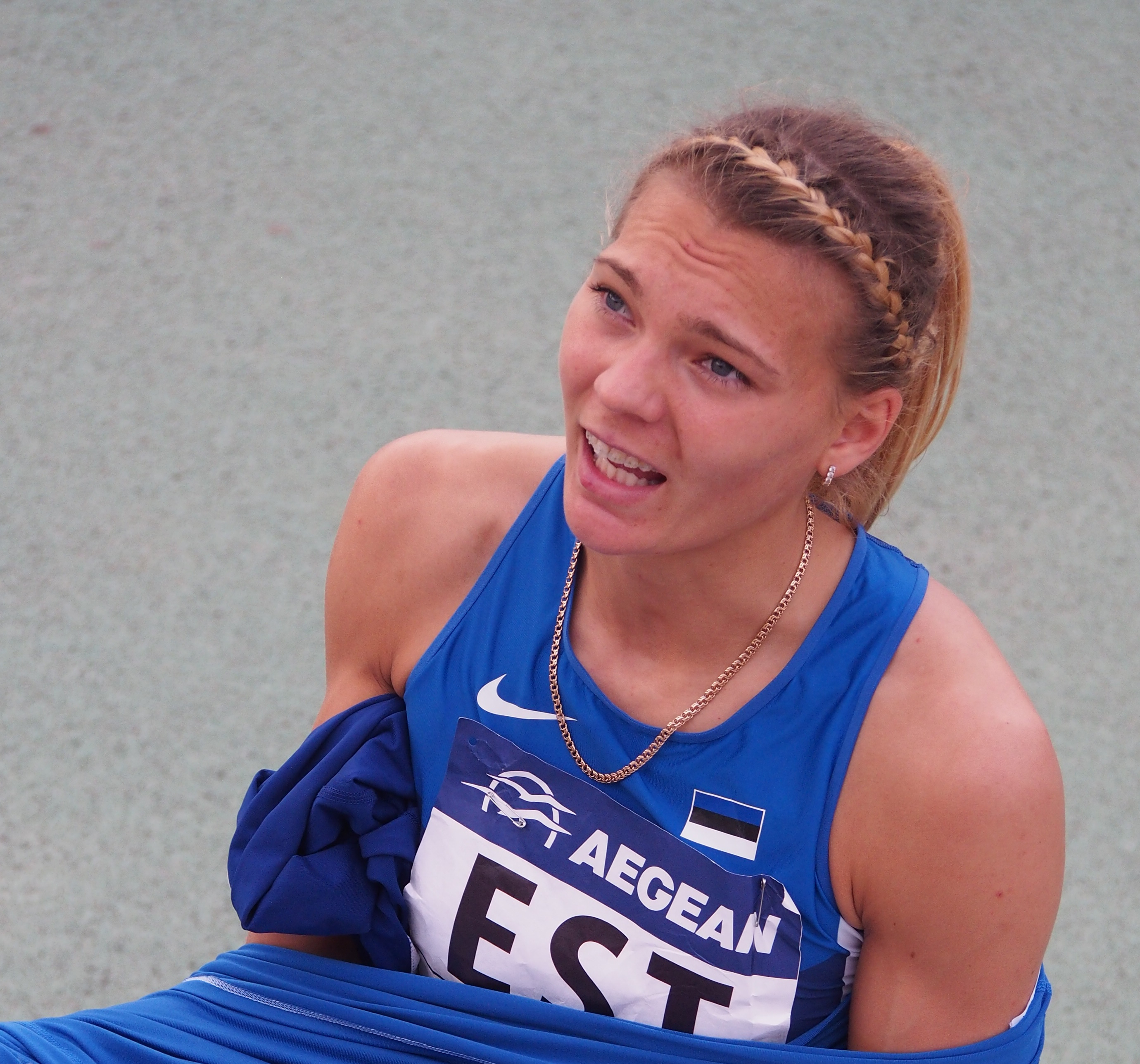
- Eleriin Haas in 2015

Personal information
- Born: 4 July 1992 (age 33) Pärnu, Estonia
- Height: 1.80 m (5 ft 11 in)

Sport
- Sport: Track and field
- Event: High jump
- Club: Kristiinan Urheilijat
- Coached by: Reijo Jokela

Eleriin Haas (born 4 July 1992 in Pärnu) is an Estonian athlete specialising in the high jump. She represented her country at the 2015 World Championships without qualifying for the final.

Her personal bests in the event are 1.94 metres outdoors (Zürich 2014) and 1.90 metres indoors (Pärnu 2012).

She has a son Kristofer, born in 2010.

== Competition record ==
Year	Competition	Venue	Position	Result
Representing Estonia
2009	World Youth Championships	Brixen, Italy	17th (q)	1.74 m
2009	European Youth Olympic Festival	Tampere, Finland	7th	1.75 m
2011	European Junior Championships	Tallinn, Estonia	11th	1.77 m
2012	European Championships	Helsinki, Finland	18th (q)	1.83 m
2013	European Indoor Championships	Gothenburg, Sweden	14th (q)	1.89 m
2013	European U23 Championships	Tampere, Finland	6th	1.87 m
2014	European Championships	Zürich, Switzerland	7th	1.94 m
2015	World Championships	Beijing, China	25th (q)	1.85 m
2016	European Championships	Amsterdam, Netherlands	18th (q)	1.85 m
2018	European Championships	Berlin, Germany	25th (q)	1.76 m
