= 2017 European Athletics Indoor Championships – Women's high jump =

The women's high jump event at the 2017 European Athletics Indoor Championships was held on 3 March at 17:30 (qualification) and 4 March at 16:30 (final) local time.

== Medalists ==
Gold	Silver	Bronze
Airine Palsyte; Lithuania	Ruth Beitia; Spain	Yuliya Levchenko; Ukraine

== Records ==
Standing records prior to the 2017 European Athletics Indoor Championships
World record	Kajsa Bergqvist (SWE)	2.08	Arnstadt, Germany	4 February 2006
European record	Kajsa Bergqvist (SWE)	2.08	Arnstadt, Germany	4 February 2006
Championship record	Tia Hellebaut (BEL)	2.05	Birmingham, Great Britain	3 March 2005
World Leading	Airinė Palšytė (LTU)	2.00	Vilnius, Lithuania	28 January 2017
European Leading	Airinė Palšytė (LTU)	2.00	Vilnius, Lithuania	28 January 2017

== Results ==
=== Qualification ===
Qualification: Qualifying performance 1.93 (Q) or at least 8 best performers (q) advance to the Final.

Rank	Athlete	Nationality	1.70	1.76	1.81	1.86	1.90	Result	Note
1	Ruth Beitia	Spain	–	–	–	o	o	1.90	q
1	Ana Šimić	Croatia	–	–	o	o	o	1.90	q
3	Morgan Lake	Great Britain	–	–	o	xo	o	1.90	q
4	Jossie Graumann	Germany	–	o	o	o	xo	1.90	q
4	Yuliya Levchenko	Ukraine	–	o	o	o	xo	1.90	q
4	Oksana Okuneva	Ukraine	o	o	o	o	xo	1.90	q
4	Airinė Palšytė	Lithuania	–	–	o	o	xo	1.90	q
8	Michaela Hrubá	Czech Republic	o	o	o	xo	xxo	1.90	q
9	Maruša Černjul	Slovenia	–	o	o	o	xxx	1.86	
9	Yuliya Chumachenko	Ukraine	–	o	o	o	xxx	1.86	
9	Erika Furlani	Italy	–	o	o	o	xxx	1.86	
9	Kamila Lićwinko	Poland	–	–	–	o	xxx	1.86	
9	Linda Sandblom	Finland	–	o	o	o	xxx	1.86	
9	Sofie Skoog	Sweden	–	o	o	o	xxx	1.86	
9	Maryia Zhodzik	Belarus	o	o	o	o	xxx	1.86	
16	Marie-Laurence Jungfleisch	Germany	–	–	xo	o	xxx	1.86	
17	Marija Vuković	Montenegro	o	o	o	xo	xxx	1.86	
18	Serena Capponcelli	Italy	o	o	xxo	xo	xxx	1.86	
19	Emma Green	Sweden	–	o	xo	xxo	xxx	1.86	
20	Ekaterina Krasovskiy	Austria	o	o	o	xxx		1.81	
21	Claudia Guri	Andorra	xo	xo	xxx			1.76	

=== Final ===
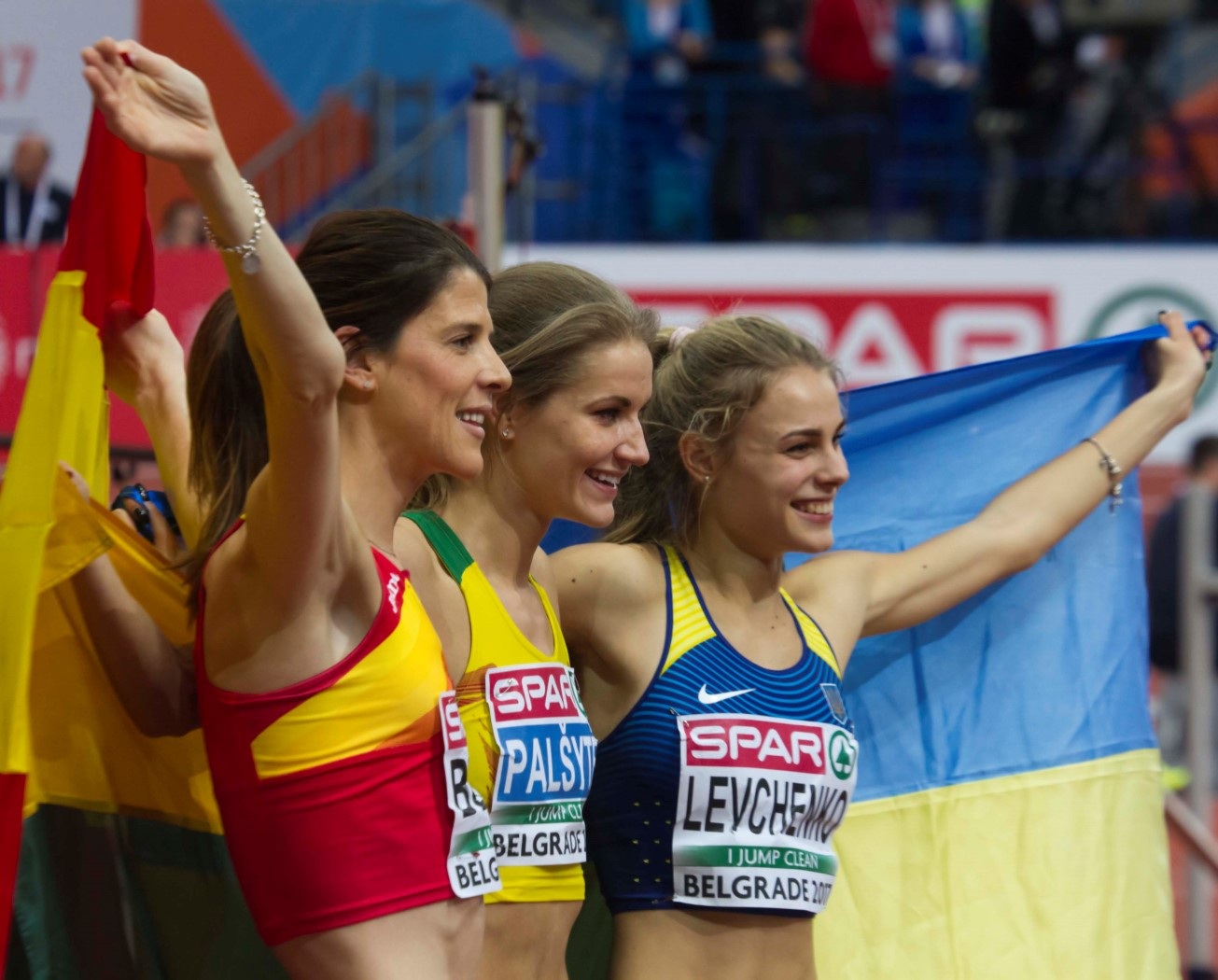
The medallists

Rank	Athlete	Nationality	1.80	1.85	1.89	1.92	1.94	1.96	1.98	2.01	Result	Note
1st place, gold medalist(s)	Airinė Palšytė	Lithuania	o	o	o	o	o	o	—	xo	2.01	WL, NR
2nd place, silver medalist(s)	Ruth Beitia	Spain	—	o	—	o	o	xxx			1.94	
3rd place, bronze medalist(s)	Yuliya Levchenko	Ukraine	o	xo	o	o	xxo	xxx			1.94	PB
4	Oksana Okuneva	Ukraine	o	o	o	o	xxx				1.92	
5	Jossie Graumann	Germany	o	o	o	xxo	xxx				1.92	=PB
6	Michaela Hrubá	Czech Republic	o	o	xxo	xxo	xxx				1.92	SB
7	Ana Šimić	Croatia	o	xo	o	xxx					1.89	
8	Morgan Lake	United Kingdom	o	o	xxx						1.85	
