= Marija Vuković =

Montenegrin high jumper

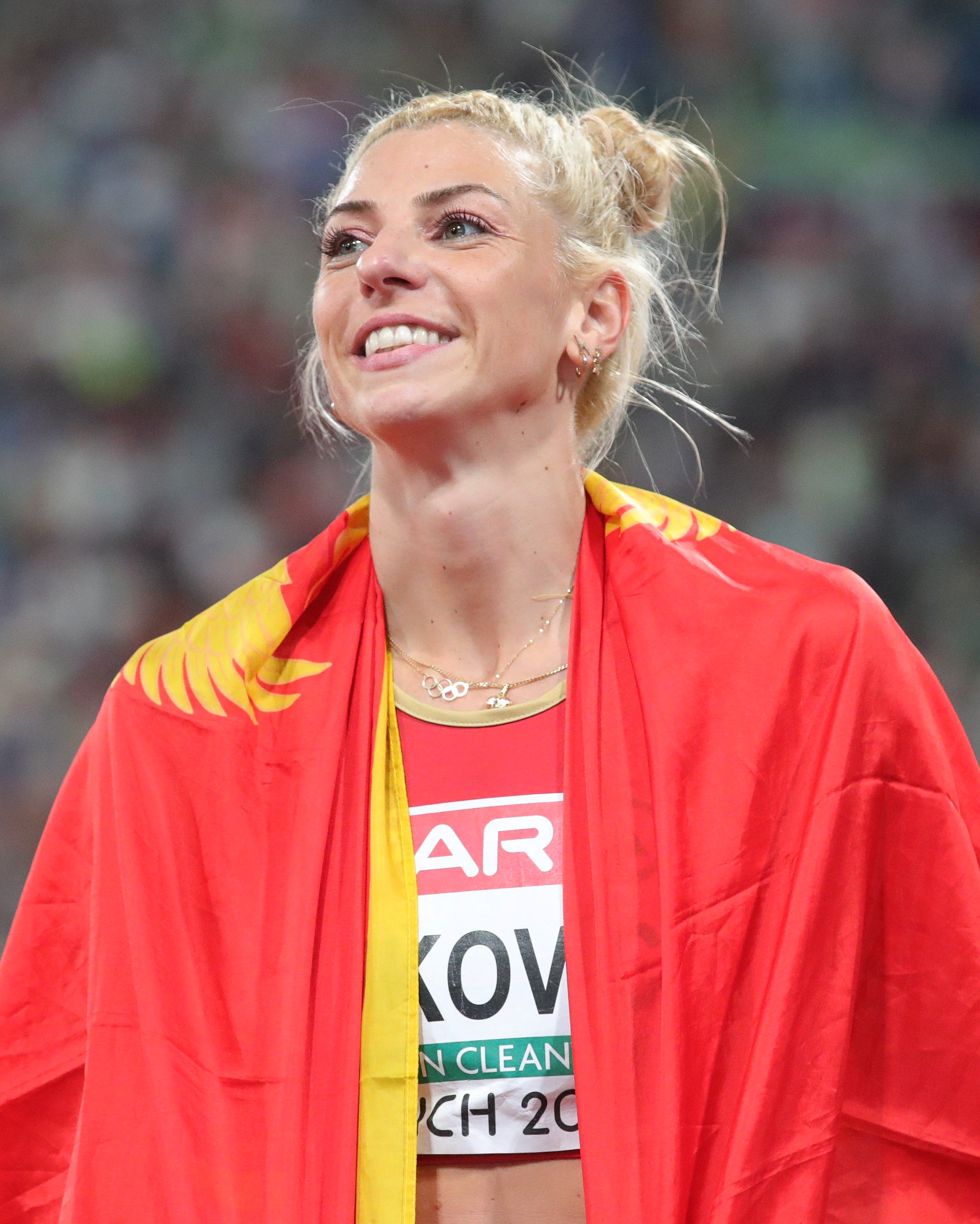
- Vuković in 2022

Personal information
- Nationality: Montenegrin
- Born: 21 January 1992 (age 34) Knin, Croatia
- Height: 1.94 m (6 ft 4 in)

Sport
- Country: Montenegro
- Sport: Athletics
- Event: High jump

Achievements and titles
- Olympic finals: 2020 Tokyo; High jump, 9th
- Personal bests: High jump: 1.97 m (6 ft 5 1/2 in) NR (Smederevo 2021); Indoors; High jump: 1.96 m (6 ft 5 in) NR (Banská Bystrica 2022)
Medal record
Women's athletics
Representing Montenegro
European Championships
Silver medal – second place	2022 Munich	High jump
Bronze medal – third place	2026 Birmingham	High jump
Games of the Small States of Europe
Gold medal – first place	2011 Schaan	High jump
Gold medal – first place	2013 Luxembourg	High jump
Gold medal – first place	2015 Reykjavík	High jump
Gold medal – first place	2017 San Marino	High jump
Gold medal – first place	2019 Bar	High jump
Gold medal – first place	2025 Andorra la Vella	High jump
Mediterranean Games
Gold medal – first place	2022 Oran	High jump
Gold medal – first place	2026 Taranto	High jump
World Junior Championships
Gold medal – first place	2010 Moncton	High jump
European Junior Championships
Silver medal – second place	2009 Novi Sad	High jump

Marija Vuković (Serbian Cyrillic: Марија Вуковић; born 21 January 1992) is a Montenegrin athlete specializing in the high jump. She won Montenegro's first ever European Athletics Championship medal with silver in the high jump at Munich 2022.

As a 17-year-old Vuković was the 2009 European Junior Championship silver medallist. By winning the 2010 World Junior Championships, she became her country's first ever medallist in a global athletics competition.

== Biography ==
Marija Vuković was born in Knin, the then-capital of unrecognized Republic of Serbian Krajina. In 1995 her family settled as refugees in Cetinje.

She won the silver medal in high jump competition at the 2009 European Junior Championships in Novi Sad, Serbia, and gold at the 2010 World Junior Championships held in Moncton, Canada, which was the first medal won by a Montenegrin athlete in global competition.

Vuković competed at the 2020 Tokyo Olympics and finished ninth.

Her personal bests are: 1.97 m (6 ft 5 1/2 in) in the high jump (Smederevo 2021, NR), 1.96 m (6 ft 5 in) in the indoor high jump (Banská Bystrica 2022, NR), and 11.55 m (37 ft 10 1/2 in) in the triple jump (+1.0 m/s, Bar 2008, NU18R NU20R).

She won the bronze medal at high jump at the 2026 European Championship in Birmingham. At a Diamond League meeting, she cleared 1.98 metres, equalling her personal best. She also won gold at the Mediterranean Games and was subsequently named the best female athlete in the Balkans.

== Competition record ==
Representing Montenegro
Year	Competition	Venue	Position	Notes
2007	World Youth Championships	Ostrava, Czech Republic	26th (q)	1.65 m
2007	Balkan U20 Championships	Kragujevac, Serbia	2nd	1.78 m
2008	World Junior Championships	Bydgoszcz, Poland	18th (q)	1.78 m
2009	Balkan Indoor Championships	Piraeus, Greece	3rd	1.80 m i
2009	Mediterranean Games	Pescara, Italy	5th	1.75 m
2009	World Youth Championships	Brixen, Italy	9th	1.75 m
2009	European Junior Championships	Novi Sad, Serbia	2nd	1.89 m
2010	World Junior Championships	Moncton, Canada	1st	1.91 m
2010	European Championships	Barcelona, Spain	21st (q)	1.87 m
2011	Games of the Small States of Europe	Schaan, Liechtenstein	1st	1.86 m
2011	European Junior Championships	Tallinn, Estonia	8th	1.81 m
2011	World Championships	Daegu, South Korea	28th (q)	1.80 m
2013	Balkan Indoor Championships	Istanbul, Turkey	5th	1.74 m i
2013	Games of the Small States of Europe	Luxembourg, Luxembourg	1st	1.77 m
2013	Balkan Championships	Stara Zagora, Bulgaria	7th	1.75 m
2015	Balkan Indoor Championships	Istanbul, Turkey	3rd	1.82 m i
2015	European Indoor Championships	Prague, Czech Republic	20th (q)	1.77 m i
2015	Games of the Small States of Europe	Reykjavík, Iceland	1st	1.80 m
2015	European Games (Note: The third league of the 2015 European Team Championships)	Baku, Azerbaijan	1st	1.86 m
2015	Universiade	Gwangju, South Korea	4th	1.80 m
2015	Balkan Championships	Pitești, Romania	3rd	1.87 m
2016	Balkan Indoor Championships	Istanbul, Turkey	2nd	1.84 m i
2016	Balkan Championships	Pitești, Romania	2nd	1.88 m
2016	European Championships	Amsterdam, Netherlands	18th (q)	1.85 m
2017	Balkan Indoor Championships	Belgrade, Serbia	2nd	1.86 m i
2017	European Indoor Championships	Belgrade, Serbia	17th (q)	1.86 m i
2017	Games of the Small States of Europe	Serravalle, San Marino	1st	1.91 m
2017	European Team Championships Third League	Marsa, Malta	1st	1.90 m
2017	Balkan Championships	Novi Pazar, Serbia	3rd	1.84 m
2017	World Championships	London, United Kingdom	21st (q)	1.85 m
2017	Universiade	Taipei, Taiwan	4th	1.88 m
2018	Balkan Indoor Championships	Istanbul, Turkey	2nd	1.89 m i
2018	Championships of the Small States of Europe	Schaan, Liechtenstein	1st	1.86 m
2018	Balkan Championships	Stara Zagora, Bulgaria	5th	1.80 m
2018	European Championships	Berlin, Germany	18th (q)	1.81 m
2019	Balkan Indoor Championships	Istanbul, Turkey	2nd	1.92 m i
2019	European Indoor Championships	Glasgow, United Kingdom	13th (q)	1.89 m i
2019	Games of the Small States of Europe	Bar, Montenegro	1st	1.86 m
2019	European Team Championships Third League	Skopje, North Macedonia	1st	1.84 m
2019	World Championships	Doha, Qatar	18th (q)	1.85 m
2020	Balkan Indoor Championships	Istanbul, Turkey	2nd	1.88 m i
2020	Balkan Championships	Cluj-Napoca, Romania	4th	1.84 m
2021	Balkan Indoor Championships	Istanbul, Turkey	1st	1.90 m i
2021	European Indoor Championships	Toruń, Poland	7th	1.92 m i
2021	Championships of the Small States of Europe	Serravalle, San Marino	1st	1.86 m
2021	European Team Championships Third League	Limassol, Cyprus	1st	1.90 m
2021	Balkan Championships	Smederevo, Serbia	1st	1.97 m PB
2021	Olympic Games	Tokyo, Japan	9th	1.96 m
2022	Balkan Indoor Championships	Istanbul, Turkey	2nd	1.90 m
2022	World Indoor Championships	Belgrade, Serbia	4th	1.95 m i
2022	Mediterranean Games	Oran, Algeria	1st	1.92 m
2022	World Championships	Eugene, OR, United States	14th (q)	1.90 m
2022	European Championships	Munich, Germany	2nd	1.95 m
2023	European Indoor Championships	Istanbul, Turkey	10th (q)	1.87 m i
2023	World Championships	Budapest, Hungary	25th (q)	1.85 m
2024	European Championships	Rome, Italy	–	NM
2024	Championships of the Small States of Europe	Gibraltar	2nd	1.77 m
2025	European Indoor Championships	Apeldoorn, Netherlands	8th	1.85 m
2025	Games of the Small States of Europe	Andorra la Vella, Andorra	1st	1.85 m
2025	World Championships	Tokyo, Japan	12th	1.88 m
2026	World Indoor Championships	Toruń, Poland	10th	1.85 m
2026	European Championships	Birmingham, United Kingdom	3rd	1.95 m
2026	Mediterranean Games	Taranto, Italy	1st	1.94 m

== Notes ==
1. At the time of her birth, Knin was part of the self-proclaimed Republic of Serbian Krajina.
