= Maruša Černjul =

Slovenian high jumper

Personal information
- Born: 30 June 1992 (age 34) Celje, Slovenia
- Education: University of Nebraska–Lincoln
- Height: 1.77 m (5 ft 10 in)
- Weight: 56 kg (123 lb)

Sport
- Sport: Athletics
- Event: High jump
- College team: Nebraska Cornhuskers

Maruša Černjul (born 30 June 1992) is a Slovenian athlete specialising in the high jump. She represented her country at the 2016 Summer Olympics in Rio de Janeiro without qualifying for the final.

Her personal bests in the event are 1.93 metres outdoors (Celje 2016) and 1.90 metres indoors (Lincoln 2016).

== International competitions ==
Year	Competition	Venue	Position	Notes
Representing Slovenia
2009	World Youth Championships	Brixen, Italy	22nd (q)	1.70 m
2009	European Youth Olympic Festival	Tampere, Finland	10th	1.70 m
2010	World Junior Championships	Moncton, Canada	14th (q)	1.78 m
2011	European Junior Championships	Tallinn, Estonia	13th (q)	1.80 m
2016	European Championships	Amsterdam, Netherlands	9th	1.89 m
2016	Olympic Games	Rio de Janeiro, Brazil	21st (q)	1.92 m
2017	European Indoor Championships	Belgrade, Serbia	9th (q)	1.86 m
2017	World Championships	London, United Kingdom	13th (q)	1.89 m
2019	European Indoor Championships	Glasgow, United Kingdom	10th	1.91 m
2019	World Championships	Doha, Qatar	16th (q)	1.90 m
