= Airinė Palšytė =

Lithuanian high jumper

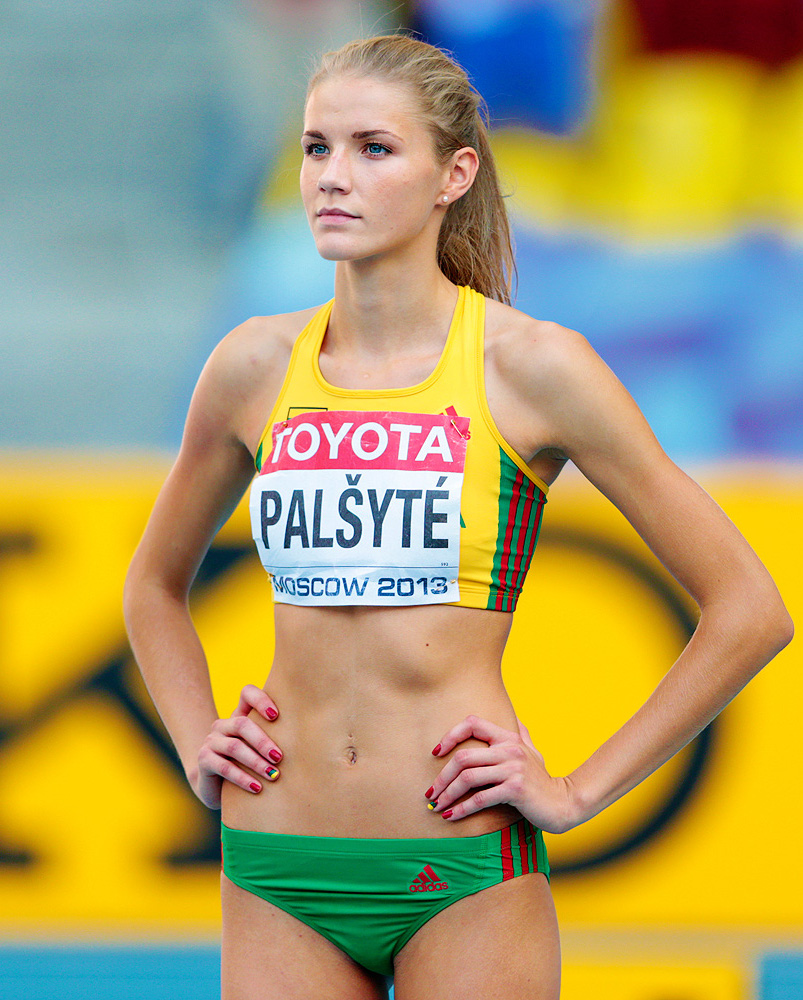
- A.Palšytė at World Championships Moscow 2013

Personal information
- Nationality: Lithuanian
- Born: 13 July 1992 (age 34) Kaunas, Lithuania
- Education: Vilnius University
- Height: 1.86 m (6 ft 1 in)
- Weight: 63 kg (139 lb)

Sport
- Country: Lithuania
- Sport: Track and field
- Event: High jump
- Club: SC COSMA

Achievements and titles
- Olympic finals: 2012: 10th 2016: T13th
- Personal bests: Outdoor: 1.98 m NR; Indoor: 2.01 m NR
Medal record
Women's athletics
Representing Lithuania
European Championships
Silver medal – second place	2016 Amsterdam	High jump
European Indoor Championships
Gold medal – first place	2017 Belgrade	High jump
Bronze medal – third place	2019 Glasgow	High jump
Summer Universiade
Gold medal – first place	2015 Gwangju	High jump
Silver medal – second place	2011 Shenzhen	High jump
Bronze medal – third place	2017 Taipei	High jump
European U23 Championships
Silver medal – second place	2013 Tampere	High jump
World Junior Championships
Silver medal – second place	2010 Moncton	High jump

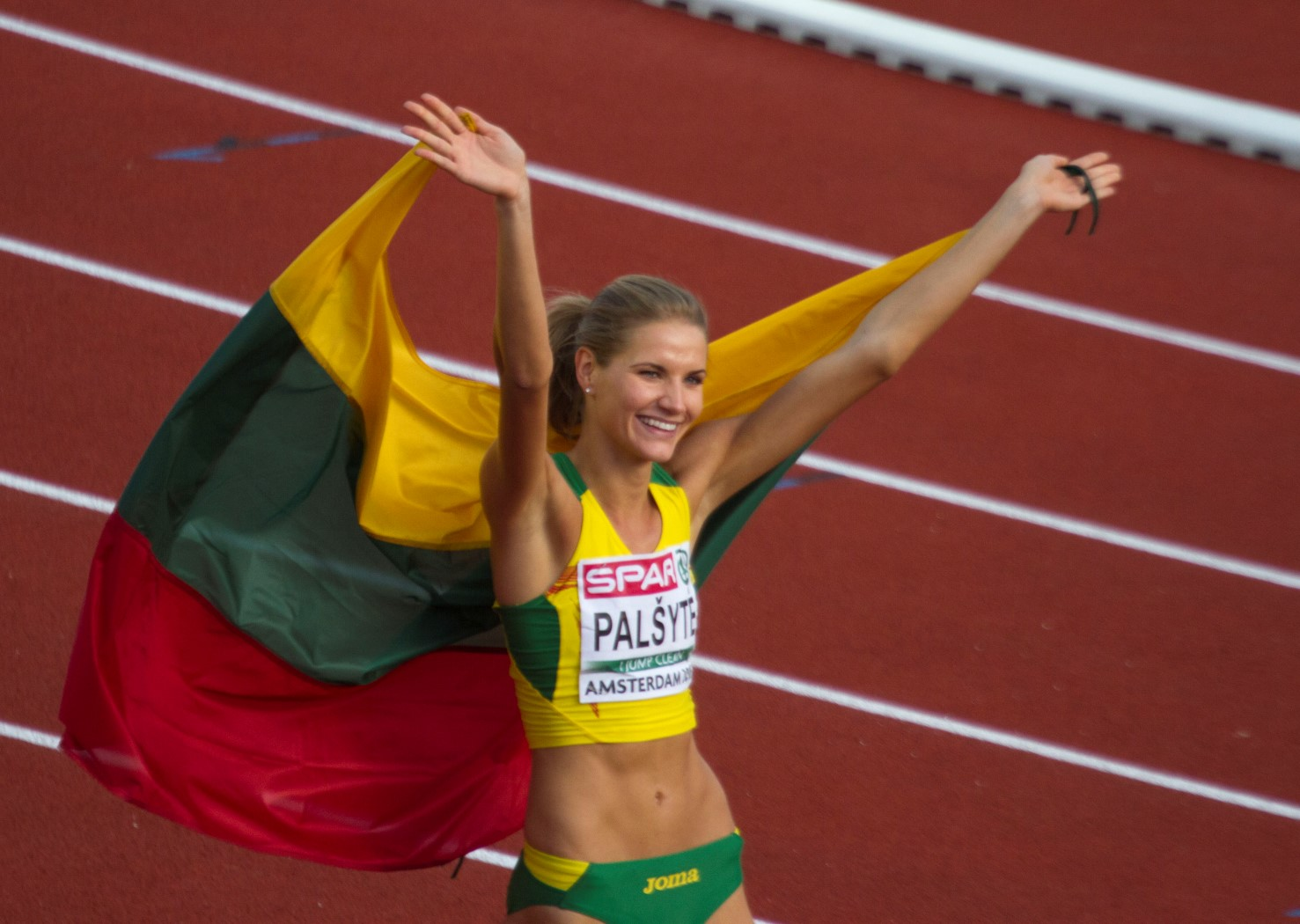

Airinė Palšytė (born 13 July 1992) is a Lithuanian high jumper. She won the gold medal at the 2017 European Indoor Championships.

== Personal life ==
Palšytė was born in Kaunas, Lithuania. Her father Aurimas Palšis was a professional basketball player.

In 1998, Palšytė enrolled at the Simono Stanevičiaus Secondary School in Vilnius. From 2006 to 2010, she studied at Žemyna's gymnasium, also in Vilnius. In 2010, she started studying business information management at Vilnius University, Faculty of Communications. After completing her undergraduate degree, she began her Master's studies at Vilnius University, Faculty of Economics (marketing and integrated communications). Her boyfriend is a Lithuanian sprinter (specialising in 60, 100 and 200 meters) Kostas Skrabulis.

== Athletic career ==
At the 2008 Lithuanian Athletics Championships, Palšytė finished second and won her first senior national championships medal. At the 2010 Lithuanian Athletics Championships, she won her first national gold medal.

Palšytė competed at the Olympic Games in 2012, 2016, 2021, and 2024. She won the silver medal at the 2016 European Championships. She won the gold medal at the 2017 European Indoor Championships and the bronze medal at the 2019 European Indoor Championships.

Her personal best is 2.01 metres, achieved in March 2017 when she won gold at the European Indoor Championships. It was also a new national high jump record. Her personal best outdoors jump is 1.98 metres, achieved in both July and August 2014 in Kaunas and Eberstadt.

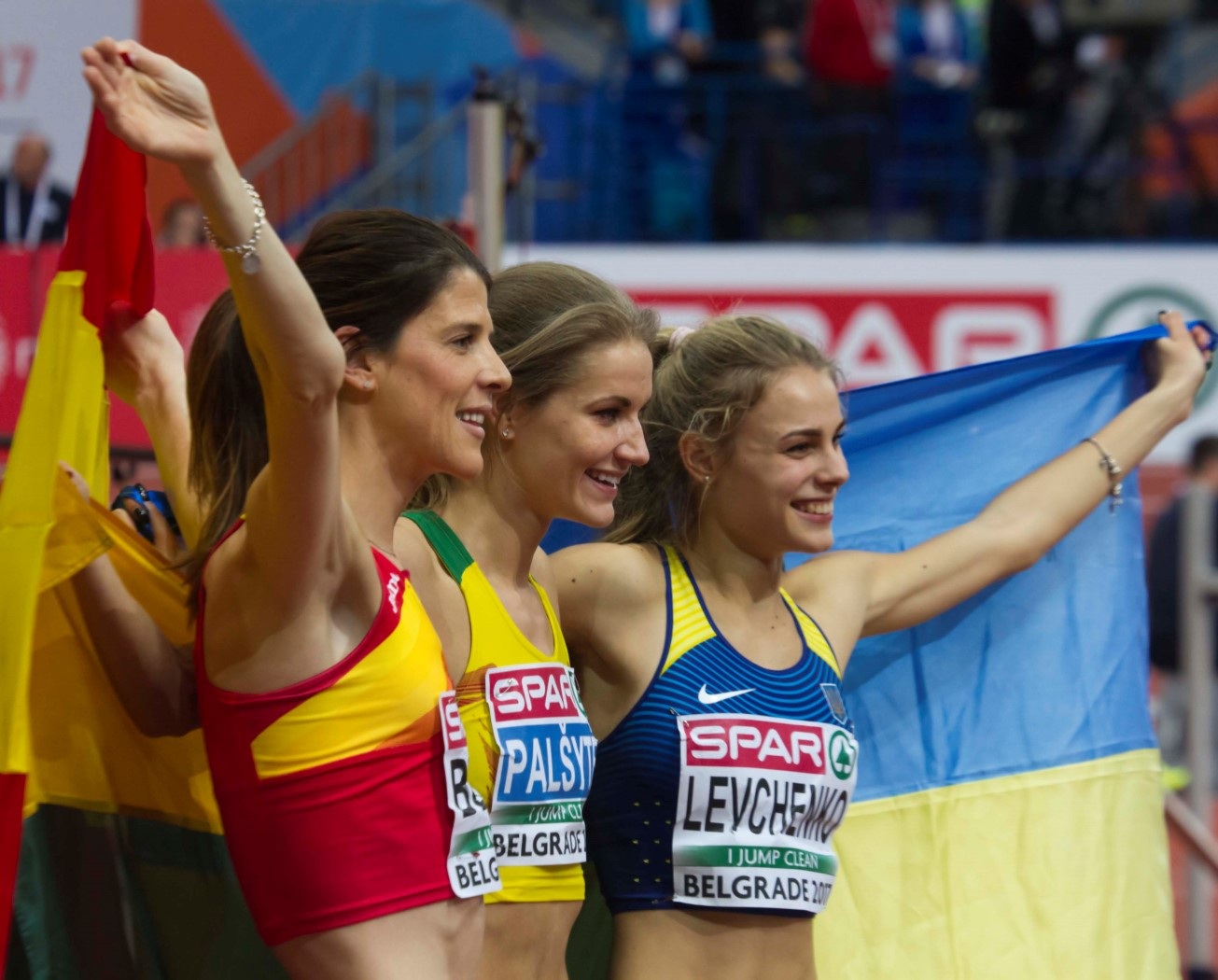
2017 European Indoor Championships podium (R.Beitia, A.Palšytė, Y. Levchenko)

== Achievements ==
Year	Competition	Venue	Position	Notes
Representing Lithuania
2008	World Junior Championships	Bydgoszcz, Poland	19th (q)	1.74 m
2009	World Youth Championships	Brixen, Italy	4th	1.82 m
2010	World Indoor Championships	Doha, Qatar	16th (q)	1.85 m
2010	World Junior Championships	Moncton, Canada	2nd	1.89 m
2011	Universiade	Shenzhen, China	2nd	1.96 m
2011	European Indoor Championships	Paris, France	19th (q)	1.85 m
2012	World Indoor Championships	Istanbul, Turkey	9th (q)	1.92 m
2012	European Championships	Helsinki, Finland	9th	1.89 m
2012	Olympic Games	London, United Kingdom	10th	1.89 m
2013	European U23 Championship	Tampere, Finland	2nd	1.92 m
2013	World Championships	Moscow, Russia	11th	1.89 m
2014	World Indoor Championships	Sopot, Poland	10th (q)	1.92 m
2014	European Championships	Zürich, Switzerland	13th	1.90 m
2015	European Indoor Championships	Prague, Czech Republic	4th	1.94 m
2015	Universiade	Gwangju, South Korea	1st	1.84 m
2015	World Championships	Beijing, China	14th (q)	1.89 m
2016	World Indoor Championships	Portland, United States	4th	1.96 m
2016	European Championships	Amsterdam, Netherlands	2nd	1.96 m
2016	Olympic Games	Rio de Janeiro, Brazil	13th	1.88 m
2017	European Indoor Championships	Belgrade, Serbia	1st	2.01 m
2017	World Championships	London, United Kingdom	7th	1.92 m
2017	Universiade	Taipei, Taiwan	3rd	1.91 m
2018	European Championships	Berlin, Germany	4th	1.96 m
2019	European Indoor Championships	Glasgow, United Kingdom	3rd	1.97 m
2019	World Championships	Doha, Qatar	22nd (q)	1.85 m
2021	Olympic Games	Tokyo, Japan	28th (q)	1.86 m
2023	World Championships	Budapest, Hungary	20th (q)	1.85 m
2024	European Championships	Rome, Italy	13th (q)	1.89 m
2024	Olympic Games	Paris, France	15th (q)	1.88 m
