= Michaela Hrubá =

Czech high jumper (born 1998)

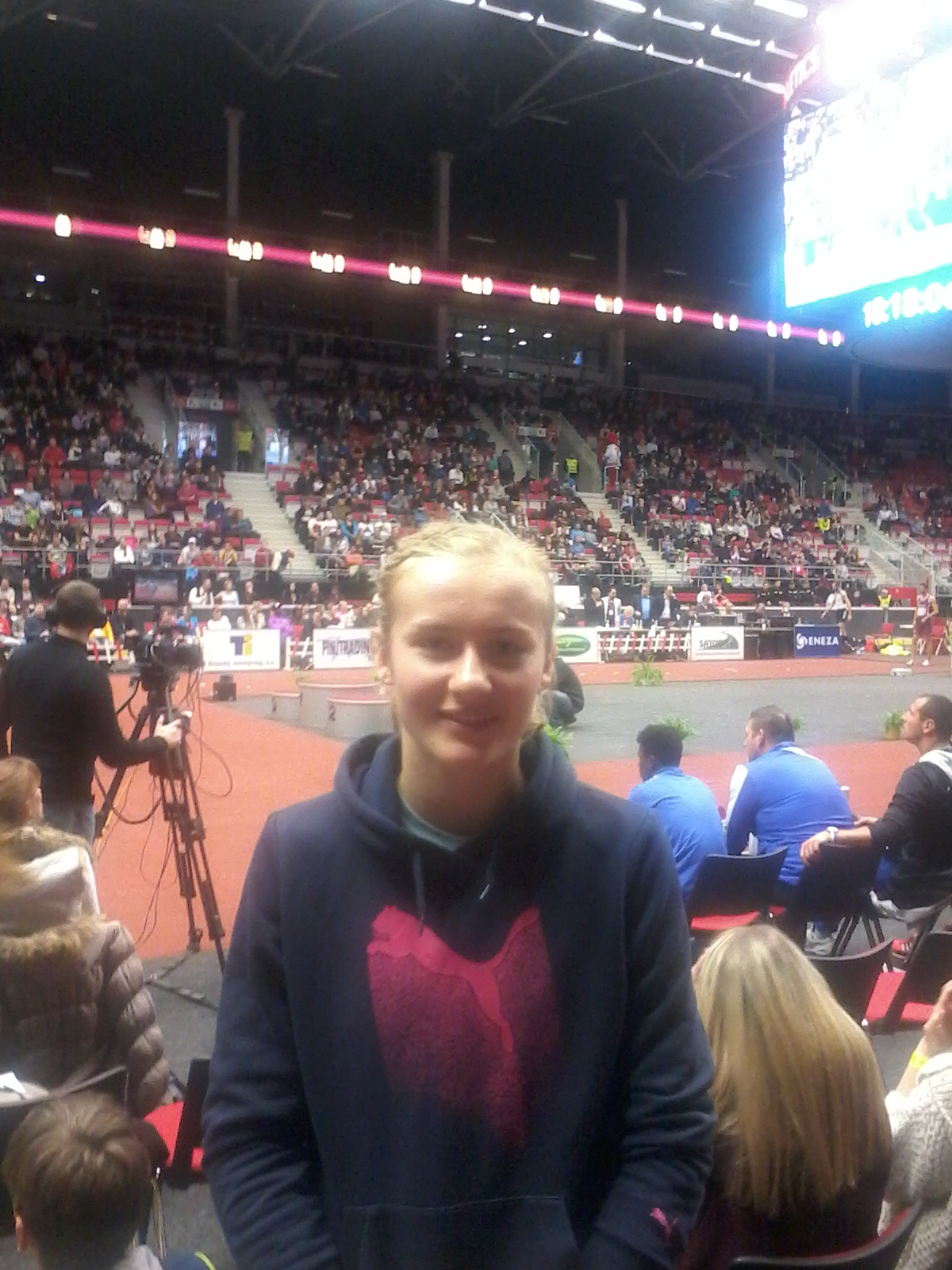
- Hrubá in Třinec at Beskydská laťka in 2016.

Personal information
- Born: 21 February 1998 (age 28) Bořitov, Czech Republic
- Height: 1.88 m (6 ft 2 in)
- Weight: 75 kg (165 lb)

Sport
- Country: Czech Republic
- Sport: Athletics
- Event: High jump

Achievements and titles
- Personal bests: High jump (outdoor): 1.94 m (Villeneuve, 2017); High jump (indoor): 1.95 m (Prague, 2016); Triple jump: 12.89 m (Hodonín, 2015)
Medal record
Women's athletics
World Junior Championships
Gold medal – first place	2016 Bydgoszcz	High jump
Silver medal – second place	2014 Oregon	High jump
World Youth Championships
Gold medal – first place	2015 Cali	High jump
Youth Olympics
Bronze medal – third place	2014 Nanjing	High jump

Michaela Hrubá (Czech pronunciation: [ˈmɪxaɛla ˈɦrubaː]; born 21 February 1998) is a Czech athlete who specializes in the high jump. She also occasionally competes in the triple jump and heptathlon.

== Achievements ==
Year	Competition	Venue	Position	Notes
Representing Czech Republic
2014	World U20 Championships	Eugene, United States	2nd	1.91 m
2014	Youth Olympic Games	Nanjing, China	3rd	1.85 m
2015	European Indoor Championships	Prague, Czech Republic	8th	1.85 m
2015	World Youth Championships	Cali, Colombia	1st	1.90 m
2016	European Championships	Amsterdam, Netherlands	12th	1.84 m
2016	World U20 Championships	Bydgoszcz, Poland	1st	1.91 m
2017	European Indoor Championships	Belgrade, Serbia	6th	1.92 m
2017	World Championships	London, United Kingdom	11th	1.92 m
2018	World Indoor Championships	Birmingham, United Kingdom	10th	1.84 m
2018	European Championships	Berlin, Germany	6th	1.91 m
2019	European Indoor Championships	Glasgow, United Kingdom	6th	1.94 m
2023	World Championships	Budapest, Hungary	20th (q)	1.85 m
2024	European Championships	Rome, Italy	19th (q)	1.85 m
2024	Olympic Games	Paris, France	15th (q)	1.88 m
2025	European Indoor Championships	Apeldoorn, Netherlands	10th (q)	1.85 m
2025	World Championships	Tokyo, Japan	12th	1.88 m
2026	European Championships	Birmingham, United Kingdom	22nd (q)	1.84 m

Awards
Preceded by Ester Ledecká; Jiří Janošek	Czech Junior Athlete of the Year; 2016; 2017 (with Filip Nepejchal)	Succeeded by Barbora Seemanová
