= Ximena Esquivel =

Mexican athletics competitor

Personal information
- Full name: Ximena Lizbeth Esquivel Guzmán
- Born: 22 August 1997 (age 28)

Sport
- Country: Mexico
- Sport: Track and field
- Event: High jump
Medal record
Track and field
Representing Mexico
NACAC Championships
Bronze medal – third place	2022 Freeport	High jump
Central American and Caribbean Games
Silver medal – second place	2018 Barranquilla	High jump
World U20 Championships
Silver medal – second place	2016 Bydgoszcz	High jump
Pan American U20 Championships
Silver medal – second place	2015 Edmonton	High jump

Ximena Lizbeth Esquivel Guzmán (born 22 August 1997) is a Mexican high jumper and former sprinter who competes in international elite competitions. She is a World and Pan American U20 silver medalist and has competed at the 2014 Summer Youth Olympics.

She is originally from Querétaro.
