= Elizabeth Lamb (athlete) =

New Zealand high jumper (born 1991)

Elizabeth Chuah Lamb (now Gapes; born 12 May 1991) is a high jumper from New Zealand.

Lamb won a gold medal at the 2008 Commonwealth Youth Games in Pune, India and has also represented New Zealand at the 2010 Commonwealth Games and the 2015 Summer Universiade.

Lamb is also a fashion model and holds both a Commerce and a Science Degree from the University of Auckland.

She is married to Sam Gapes, a professional stuntman from Auckland, New Zealand.
