= 2024 Meeting de Paris =

29th edition of the annual Meeting de Paris

- Dates: 7 July 2024
- Host city: Paris, France
- Venue: Stade Sébastien Charléty
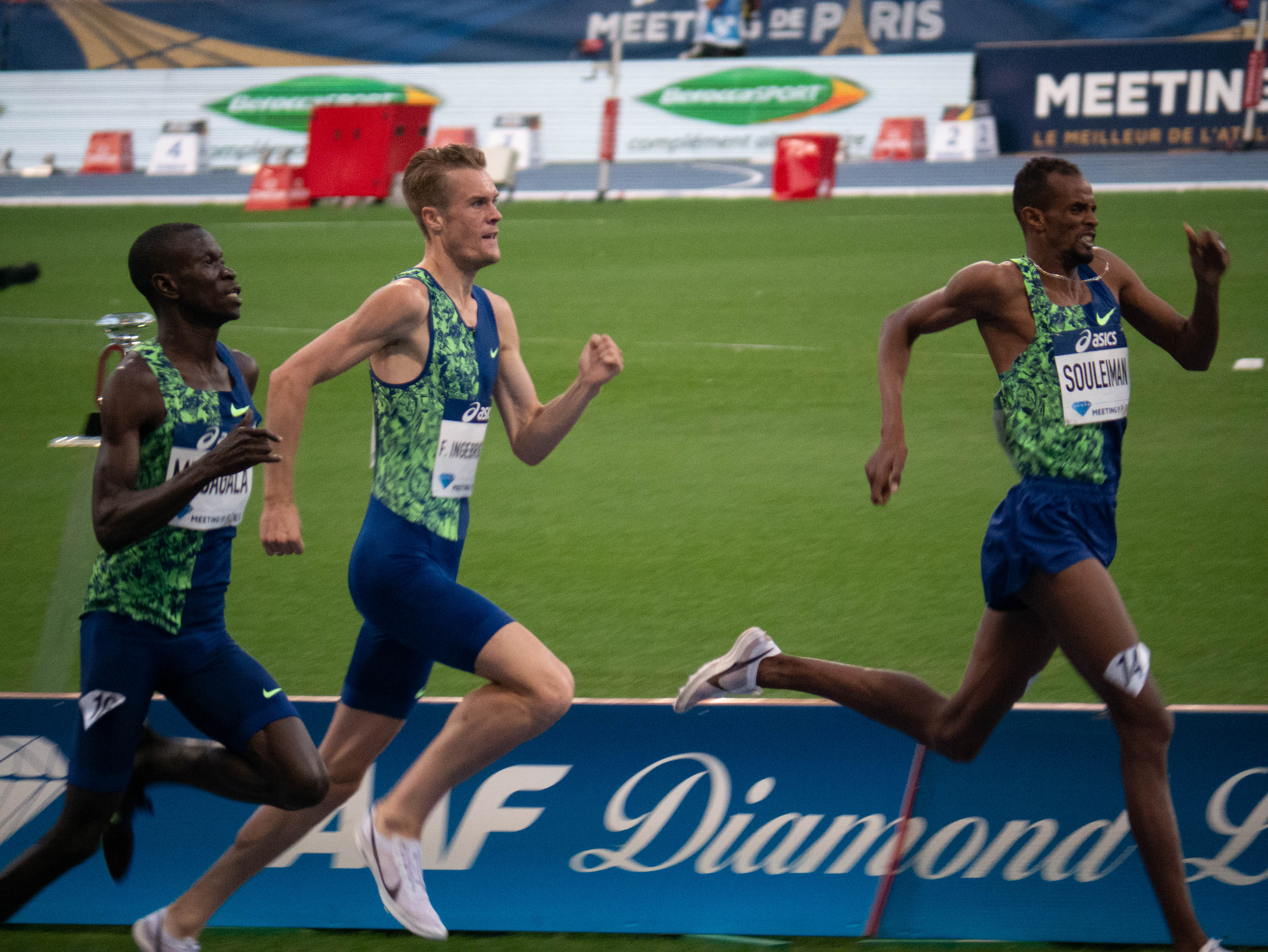
- Level: 2024 Diamond League

The 2024 Meeting de Paris was the 29th edition of the annual outdoor track and field meeting in Paris, France. Though held in the same city as the 2024 Summer Olympics, the meeting was not held at the Olympic stadium track, the Stade de France.

Held on 7 July at the Stade Sébastien Charléty, it was the eighth leg of the 2024 Diamond League – the highest level international track and field circuit. This was the fifth time the meeting was held on the stadium's renovated blue running track.

== Highlights ==
At the meeting, two world records were broken in the women's high jump (by Yaroslava Mahuchikh) and women's 1500 m (by Faith Kipyegon).

Other notable performances occurred in the men's 800 meters, where three athletes ran under the 1:42 barrier; France's Gabriel Tual (1:41.61), Kenya's Emmanuel Wanyonyi (1:41.58), who previously broke the 1:42 barrier at the 2024 Kenyan Olympic Trials, and Algeria's Djamel Sedjati (1:41.56).

== Results ==
Athletes competing in the Diamond League disciplines earned extra compensation and points which went towards qualifying for the 2024 Diamond League finals. First place earned 8 points, with each step down in place earning one less point than the previous, until no points are awarded in 9th place or lower. In the case of a tie, each tying athlete earns the full amount of points for the place.

=== Diamond Discipline ===
Men's 200 Metres (−0.4 m/s)
Place	Athlete	Age	Country	Time	Points
1st place, gold medalist(s)	Alexander Ogando	24	Dominican Republic	19.98	8
2nd place, silver medalist(s)	Tarsis Orogot	21	Uganda	20.18	7
3rd place, bronze medalist(s)	Ryan Zeze	26	France	20.46	6
4	Filippo Tortu	26	Italy	20.53	5
5	Jerome Blake	28	Canada	20.82	4
6	William Reais	25	Switzerland	20.89	3
	Cheickna Traore	23	Ivory Coast	DNF	

Men's 800 Metres
Place	Athlete	Age	Country	Time	Points
1st place, gold medalist(s)	Djamel Sedjati	25	Algeria	1:41.56	8
2nd place, silver medalist(s)	Emmanuel Wanyonyi	19	Kenya	1:41.58	7
3rd place, bronze medalist(s)	Gabriel Tual	26	France	1:41.61	6
4	Aaron Cheminingwa	26	Kenya	1:42.08	5
5	Wyclife Kinyamal	27	Kenya	1:42.08	4
6	Eliott Crestan	25	Belgium	1:42.43	3
7	Andreas Kramer	27	Sweden	1:43.66	2
8	Azeddine Habz	30	France	1:43.79	1
9	Benjamin Robert	26	France	1:44.30	
10	Tshepiso Masalela	25	Botswana	1:44.96	
	Yanis Meziane	22	France	DNF	
	Patryk Sieradzki	25	Poland	DNF	

Men's 110 Metres Hurdles (−0.6 m/s)
Place	Athlete	Age	Country	Time	Points
1st place, gold medalist(s)	Sasha Zhoya	22	France	13.15	8
2nd place, silver medalist(s)	Trey Cunningham	25	United States	13.15	7
3rd place, bronze medalist(s)	Shunsuke Izumiya	24	Japan	13.16	6
4	Enrique Llopis	23	Spain	13.21	5
5	Dylan Beard	25	United States	13.21	4
6	Michael Obasuyi	24	Belgium	13.29	3
7	Asier Martínez	24	Spain	13.35	2
	Rachid Muratake	22	Japan	DNS	

Men's 110 Metres Hurdles Round 1 - Heat
Place	Athlete	Age	Country	Time	Heat
1	Rachid Muratake	22	Japan	13.15	1
2	Trey Cunningham	25	United States	13.20	1
3	Michael Obasuyi	24	Belgium	13.22	1
4	Enrique Llopis	23	Spain	13.23	1
5	Cordell Tinch	23	United States	13.33	1
6	Jason Joseph	25	Switzerland	13.41	1
7	Raphaël Mohamed	26	France	13.45	1
8	Romain Lecoeur	26	France	13.47	1
1	Shunsuke Izumiya	24	Japan	13.16	2
2	Dylan Beard	25	United States	13.25	2
3	Asier Martínez	24	Spain	13.32	2
4	Sasha Zhoya	22	France	13.33	2
5	Lorenzo Simonelli	22	Italy	13.33	2
6	Michael Dickson	27	United States	13.60	2
7	Damian Czykier	31	Poland	13.67	2
8	Jamal Britt	25	United States	15.73	2

Men's 400 Metres Hurdles
Place	Athlete	Age	Country	Time	Points
1st place, gold medalist(s)	Alison dos Santos	24	Brazil	47.78	8
2nd place, silver medalist(s)	Rasmus Mägi	32	Estonia	47.95	7
3rd place, bronze medalist(s)	Malik James-King	25	Jamaica	48.37	6
4	Wilfried Happio	25	France	48.56	5
5	Gerald Drummond	29	Costa Rica	48.68	4
6	Carl Bengtström	24	Sweden	48.68	3
7	Ismail Abakar	20	Qatar	48.79	2
8	Berke Akçam	22	Turkey	49.23	1

Men's 3000 Metres Steeplechase
Place	Athlete	Age	Country	Time	Points
1st place, gold medalist(s)	Abrham Sime	22	Ethiopia	8:02.36	8
2nd place, silver medalist(s)	Amos Serem	21	Kenya	8:02.36	7
3rd place, bronze medalist(s)	Abraham Kibiwot	28	Kenya	8:06.70	6
4	Mohamed Amin Jhinaoui	27	Tunisia	8:09.41	5
5	Geordie Beamish	27	New Zealand	8:09.64	4
6	Avinash Sable	29	India	8:09.91	3
7	Ryuji Miura	22	Japan	8:10.52	2
8	Leonard Bett	23	Kenya	8:12.97	1
9	Jean-Simon Desgagnés	25	Canada	8:13.11	
10	Mohamed Tindouft	31	Morocco	8:14.10	
11	Anthony Rotich	33	United States	8:14.22	
12	Luc le Baron	22	France	8:15.29	
13	Louis Gilavert	26	France	8:18.83	
14	Baptiste Fourmont	25	France	8:18.91	
15	Samuel Duguna	20	Ethiopia	8:27.16	
	Lawrence Kemboi	31	Kenya	DNF	
	Wilberforce Chemiat Kones	30	Kenya	DNF	

Men's Pole Vault
Place	Athlete	Age	Country	Mark	Points
1st place, gold medalist(s)	Armand Duplantis	24	Sweden	6.00 m	8
2nd place, silver medalist(s)	Sam Kendricks	31	United States	5.95 m	7
3rd place, bronze medalist(s)	Thibaut Collet	25	France	5.85 m	6
4	EJ Obiena	28	Philippines	5.75 m	5
4	Emmanouil Karalis	24	Greece	5.75 m	5
6	Kurtis Marschall	27	Australia	5.75 m	3
7	KC Lightfoot	24	United States	5.75 m	2
7	Piotr Lisek	31	Poland	5.75 m	2
9	Ben Broeders	29	Belgium	5.65 m	
10	Renaud Lavillenie	37	France	5.65 m	
11	Jacob Wooten	27	United States	5.50 m	
12	Anthony Ammirati	20	France	5.50 m	
12	Robin Emig	23	France	5.50 m	
	Chris Nilsen	26	United States	NM	

Men's Javelin Throw
Place	Athlete	Age	Country	Mark	Points
1st place, gold medalist(s)	Julian Weber	29	Germany	85.91 m	8
2nd place, silver medalist(s)	Anderson Peters	26	Grenada	85.19 m	7
3rd place, bronze medalist(s)	Jakub Vadlejch	33	Czech Republic	85.04 m	6
4	Arshad Nadeem	27	Pakistan	84.21 m	5
5	Artur Felfner	20	Ukraine	80.48 m	4
6	Andrian Mardare	29	Moldova	79.30 m	3
7	Toni Keränen	26	Finland	79.22 m	2
8	Kishore Jena	28	India	78.10 m	1
9	Edis Matusevičius	28	Lithuania	77.36 m	
10	Marcin Krukowski	32	Poland	75.52 m	

Women's 100 Metres (−2.0 m/s)
Place	Athlete	Age	Country	Time	Points
1st place, gold medalist(s)	Patrizia van der Weken	24	Luxembourg	11.06	8
2nd place, silver medalist(s)	Gina Mariam Bass Bittaye	29	Gambia	11.09	7
3rd place, bronze medalist(s)	Ewa Swoboda	26	Poland	11.16	6
4	Mujinga Kambundji	32	Switzerland	11.22	5
5	Tamara Clark	25	United States	11.32	4
6	Zaynab Dosso	24	Italy	11.36	3
7	Gémima Joseph	22	France	11.43	2
8	Chloé Galet	22	France	11.51	1

Women's 400 Metres
Place	Athlete	Age	Country	Time	Points
1st place, gold medalist(s)	Marileidy Paulino	27	Dominican Republic	49.20	8
2nd place, silver medalist(s)	Natalia Kaczmarek	26	Poland	49.82	7
3rd place, bronze medalist(s)	Salwa Eid Naser	26	Bahrain	49.82	6
4	Alexis Holmes	24	United States	50.02	5
5	Laviai Nielsen	28	Great Britain	50.67	4
6	Lieke Klaver	25	Netherlands	50.89	3
7	Andrea Miklós	25	Romania	51.08	2
8	Amandine Brossier	28	France	51.27	1

Women's 1500 Metres
Place	Athlete	Age	Country	Time	Points
1st place, gold medalist(s)	Faith Kipyegon	30	Kenya	3:49.04 WR	8
2nd place, silver medalist(s)	Jessica Hull	27	Australia	3:50.83	7
3rd place, bronze medalist(s)	Laura Muir	31	Great Britain	3:53.79	6
4	Linden Hall	33	Australia	3:56.40	5
5	Georgia Bell	30	Great Britain	3:56.54	4
6	Susan Ejore	28	Kenya	3:57.26	3
7	Sarah Healy	23	Ireland	3:57.46	2
8	Agathe Guillemot	24	France	3:58.05	1
9	Katie Snowden	30	Great Britain	3:58.13	
10	Ciara Mageean	32	Ireland	3:58.69	
11	Nigist Getachew	22	Ethiopia	3:58.98	
12	Esther Guerrero	34	Spain	3:59.74	
13	Cory McGee	32	United States	4:01.18	
	Martyna Galant	29	Poland	DNF	
	Daniela García	22	Spain	DNF	
	Charlotte Pizzo	27	France	DNF	

Women's 3000 Metres Steeplechase
Place	Athlete	Age	Country	Time	Points
1st place, gold medalist(s)	Winfred Yavi	24	Bahrain	9:03.68	8
2nd place, silver medalist(s)	Alice Finot	33	France	9:05.01	7
3rd place, bronze medalist(s)	Elizabeth Bird	29	Great Britain	9:09.07	6
4	Olivia Markezich	23	United States	9:14.67	5
5	Lea Meyer	26	Germany	9:15.48	4
6	Marwa Bouzayani	27	Tunisia	9:15.54	3
7	Alicja Konieczek	29	Poland	9:17.20	2
8	Daisy Jepkemei	28	Kazakhstan	9:21.75	1
9	Beatrice Chepkoech	33	Kenya	9:27.21	
10	Adva Cohen	28	Israel	9:35.45	
	Jackline Chepkoech	20	Kenya	DNF	

Women's High Jump
Place	Athlete	Age	Country	Mark	Points
1st place, gold medalist(s)	Yaroslava Mahuchikh	22	Ukraine	2.10 m WR	8
2nd place, silver medalist(s)	Nicola Olyslagers	27	Australia	2.01 m	7
3rd place, bronze medalist(s)	Angelina Topić	18	Serbia	1.98 m	6
4	Lamara Distin	24	Jamaica	1.95 m	5
5	Eleanor Patterson	28	Australia	1.95 m	4
6	Nawal Meniker	26	France	1.95 m	3
7	Iryna Herashchenko	29	Ukraine	1.95 m	2
8	Britt Weerman	21	Netherlands	1.92 m	1
9	Morgan Lake	27	Great Britain	1.92 m	
10	Solène Gicquel	29	France	1.92 m	
11	Nadezhda Dubovitskaya	26	Kazakhstan	1.88 m	
12	Christina Honsel	27	Germany	1.88 m	
13	Nafissatou Thiam	29	Belgium	1.88 m	
	Kateryna Tabashnyk	30	Ukraine	NM	

Women's Long Jump
Place	Athlete	Age	Country	Mark	Points
1st place, gold medalist(s)	Larissa Iapichino	21	Italy	6.82 m (±0.0 m/s)	8
2nd place, silver medalist(s)	Plamena Mitkova	19	Bulgaria	6.78 m (+2.2 m/s)	7
3rd place, bronze medalist(s)	Quanesha Burks	29	United States	6.73 m (+0.5 m/s)	6
4	Marthe Koala	30	Burkina Faso	6.67 m (−1.1 m/s)	5
5	Hilary Kpatcha	26	France	6.65 m (+1.2 m/s)	4
6	Natalia Linares	21	Colombia	6.62 m (+0.4 m/s)	3
7	Malaika Mihambo	30	Germany	6.60 m (+0.6 m/s)	2
8	Milica Gardašević	25	Serbia	6.54 m (+0.8 m/s)	1
9	Mikaelle Assani	21	Germany	6.38 m (+0.9 m/s)	
10	Ivana Španović	34	Serbia	6.17 m (+0.7 m/s)	
11	Auriana Lazraq-Khlass	25	France	5.77 m (+0.8 m/s)	
Best wind-legal performances
	Plamena Mitkova	19	Bulgaria	6.60 m (+0.3 m/s)	

Women's Discus Throw
Place	Athlete	Age	Country	Mark	Points
1st place, gold medalist(s)	Valarie Allman	29	United States	68.07 m	8
2nd place, silver medalist(s)	Jorinde van Klinken	24	Netherlands	67.23 m	7
3rd place, bronze medalist(s)	Alida van Daalen	22	Netherlands	65.78 m	6
4	Marike Steinacker	32	Germany	64.64 m	5
5	Sandra Elkasević	34	Croatia	64.42 m	4
6	Liliana Cá	37	Portugal	61.96 m	3
7	Kristin Pudenz	31	Germany	61.49 m	2
8	Mélina Robert-Michon	44	France	60.88 m	1
9	Amanda Ngandu-Ntumba	24	France	59.60 m	
10	Shanice Craft	31	Germany	59.36 m	

=== Promotional events ===
Men's 3000 Metres
Place	Athlete	Age	Country	Time
1st place, gold medalist(s)	Jacob Krop	23	Kenya	7:28.83
2nd place, silver medalist(s)	Stewart McSweyn	29	Australia	7:29.46
3rd place, bronze medalist(s)	Sean McGorty	29	United States	7:35.63
4	Charles Philibert-Thiboutot	33	Canada	7:35.73
5	Thomas Ratcliffe	26	United States	7:37.92
6	Thomas Fafard	25	Canada	7:38.07
7	Matthew Wilkinson	25	United States	7:38.18
8	Santiago Catrofe	25	Uruguay	7:38.95
9	Isaac Kibet Ndiema	25	Kenya	7:39.12
10	Teddese Lemi	25	Ethiopia	7:42.42
11	Adisu Girma	24	Ethiopia	7:42.42
12	Nassim Hassaous	30	Spain	7:43.22
13	Milkesa Fikadu	19	Ethiopia	7:53.51
	Mounir Akbache	38	France	DNF
	Benoît Campion	26	France	DNF
	Filip Ingebrigtsen	31	Norway	DNF

Men's Hammer Throw
Place	Athlete	Age	Country	Mark
1st place, gold medalist(s)	Paweł Fajdek	35	Poland	77.13 m
2nd place, silver medalist(s)	Wojciech Nowicki	35	Poland	75.17 m
3rd place, bronze medalist(s)	Mykhaylo Kokhan	23	Ukraine	75.13 m
4	Bence Halász	26	Hungary	74.56 m
5	Denzel Comenentia	28	Netherlands	71.67 m

Women's Hammer Throw
Place	Athlete	Age	Country	Mark
1st place, gold medalist(s)	Brooke Andersen	28	United States	73.27 m
2nd place, silver medalist(s)	Alexandra Tavernier	30	France	69.73 m
3rd place, bronze medalist(s)	Janee' Kassanavoid	29	United States	69.66 m
4	Rose Loga	21	France	68.59 m
5	Bianca Ghelber	34	Romania	67.85 m

=== National events ===
Men's 100 Metres (+1.3 m/s)
Place	Athlete	Age	Country	Time
1st place, gold medalist(s)	Jerome Blake	28	Canada	10.19
2nd place, silver medalist(s)	Méba-Mickaël Zeze	30	France	10.30
3rd place, bronze medalist(s)	Aymeric Priam	24	France	10.35
4	Pablo Matéo	23	France	10.38
5	Ryan Zeze	26	France	10.41
6	Harold Achi-Yao	27	France	10.47
7	Paul Lada	23	France	10.56

Women's 100 Metres (−2.3 m/s)
Place	Athlete	Age	Country	Time
1st place, gold medalist(s)	Orlann Oliere	33	France	11.39
2nd place, silver medalist(s)	Sarah Richard	26	France	11.43
3rd place, bronze medalist(s)	Marie-Ange Rimlinger	22	France	11.48
4	Mallory Leconte	23	France	11.57
5	Maroussia Paré	27	France	11.59
6	Amelie-Sophie Lederer	30	Germany	11.99

=== Regional races ===
Men's 200 Metres (+0.9 m/s)
Place	Athlete	Age	Country	Time
1st place, gold medalist(s)	Adama Jammeh	31	Gambia	21.00
2nd place, silver medalist(s)	Jean-david Zouzoua	20–21	France	21.14
3rd place, bronze medalist(s)	Maxime Lancelot	23	France	21.20
4	Toumany Coulibaly	36	France	21.23
5	Adzeu Yapo Jacky	26	Ivory Coast	21.37
6	Lilian Beltai	20	France	21.63
7	To Rangers Carson	26	France	22.02

Men's 400 Metres
Place	Athlete	Age	Country	Time
1st place, gold medalist(s)	Younes Chattoui	28	Morocco	46.55
2nd place, silver medalist(s)	Gilles Anthony Afoumba	28	Congo	46.98
3rd place, bronze medalist(s)	Allan Lacroix	19	France	47.28
4	Eymeric Ahoue	22	France	47.56
5	Ange Daniel Maxime Kouamé	24–25	Ivory Coast	47.75
6	Simon Rebeyrolles	25	France	47.93

Men's 800 Metres
Place	Athlete	Age	Country	Time
1st place, gold medalist(s)	Edgar Durieux	20	France	1:48.02
2nd place, silver medalist(s)	Edouard Lécrivain	22	France	1:48.71
3rd place, bronze medalist(s)	Abdelmounaim Imade	30	France	1:48.82
4	Christophe Delaunay-Belleville	22	France	1:49.26
5	Edmond Baudot	21	France	1:49.71
6	Benjamin Thomasset	22	France	1:50.50
7	Raphael Aureau	23	France	1:50.58
8	Anis Abdelkader	23	Algeria	1:50.59
9	Issa Mben	20–21	France	1:51.32
10	Hugo Monnier	27	France	1:51.62
11	Morgan Sarnel	22	France	1:54.72
12	Aurelien Vaudois	26	France	1:58.70
	Cyril Straub	22	France	DNF

Men's 3000 Metres
Place	Athlete	Age	Country	Time
1st place, gold medalist(s)	Nicolas Rifflard	33	France	8:33.55
2nd place, silver medalist(s)	Alexandre Lepelletier	27–28	France	8:46.42
3rd place, bronze medalist(s)	Martin Péron	29–30	France	8:58.27
4	Axel Lechantoux	31–32	France	9:01.45

Women's 200 Metres (−1.2 m/s)
Place	Athlete	Age	Country	Time
1st place, gold medalist(s)	Noemie Denon	22	France	23.63
2nd place, silver medalist(s)	Romane Colletin	18–19	France	23.96
3rd place, bronze medalist(s)	Paméra Losange	21	France	23.99
4	Aaliyah Rifort Delem	22	France	24.37
5	Chloe Asselineau	21	France	24.72
6	Soizick Nlend	18	France	24.86
7	Phyllis Nguessan	22	France	24.87

Women's 400 Metres
Place	Athlete	Age	Country	Time
1st place, gold medalist(s)	Estelle Raffai	26	France	52.22
2nd place, silver medalist(s)	Romane Trinquant	17–18	France	54.74
3rd place, bronze medalist(s)	Marie Chenal	29	France	55.24
4	Maëlle Maynier	19	France	55.33
5	Lea Sellier	23	France	55.56
6	Selena Abega	20	France	55.60
7	Lina Aliane	22	France	55.70
8	Lucile Cres	30	France	56.62

Women's 800 Metres
Place	Athlete	Age	Country	Time
1st place, gold medalist(s)	Pauline Toriel	23	France	2:08.77
2nd place, silver medalist(s)	Ambre Valmorin	20	France	2:08.99
3rd place, bronze medalist(s)	Rose Perotin	18	France	2:09.02
4	Marie Temple	31	France	2:09.08
5	Noemie Bellenger	23	France	2:09.28
6	Tessa Lax	25	France	2:10.08
7	Azais Perronin	28	France	2:11.27
8	Margot Almeras	24	France	2:11.57
9	Doriane Bernardin	31	France	2:12.65
10	Heloise Roquier	19	France	2:13.48
11	Maeva Verheyden	19	France	2:15.83
12	Blandine Teninge	19–20	France	2:16.74
	Nina Ferrero	24	France	DNF
