= Maria Żodzik =

Belarusian-born Polish athlete

Personal information
- Native name: Марыя Жодзік
- National team: Belarus (until 2024); Poland (from 2024)
- Born: Maryia Zhodzik; 19 January 1997 (age 29) Baranavichy, Belarus

Sport
- Sport: Athletics
- Event: High jump

Achievements and titles
- Personal bests: High jump: 2.00 m (Tokyo, 2025)
Medal record
Women's athletics
Representing Poland
World Championships
Silver medal – second place	2025 Tokyo	High jump
European Championships
Silver medal – second place	2026 Birmingham	High jump

Maria Żodzik (Belarusian: Марыя Жодзік, romanized: Maryya Zhodzik; born 19 January 1997) is a high jumper. She was the national champion of Belarus in 2020. Having Polish grandparents, she was granted Polish citizenship in 2024 and won the silver medal at the 2025 World Athletics Championships and the 2026 European Athletics Championships, having previously also represented Poland at the 2024 Summer Olympics.

== Early life ==
Źodzik grew up in Baranavichy, Belarus. Her mother had been a high jumper and her father a distance runner, but she initially started out as a swimmer before transitioning to athletics. In the high jump she had cleared a height of 1.77m by age of 16 years-old, before hamstring and sciatic injuries ruled her out of competing for almost three years.

== Career ==
Źodzik won the high jump at the Belarusian national championships in 2020. She was named to the Belarusian team for the delayed 2020 Summer Games in Tokyo. However, she was not permitted to compete as she was ruled as not meeting the minimum testing requirements of the Anti-Doping Rules for her country by the Athletics Integrity Unit.

=== Switch to Poland; Olympic debut ===
She moved to Poland in 2022, and became based at Białystok, training under coach Robert Nazarkiewicz at the Podlasie Białystok club. She jumped a personal best 1.97 metres at the Polish Indoor Championships in Toruń on 17 February 2024.

In March 2024, she was granted Polish citizenship. She competed for Poland in the high jump at the 2024 Paris Olympics but had a best clearance of only 1.83 metres and did not proceed from the semi-final.

=== 2025: World Championships silver medalist ===
She jumped 1.96 metres to finish third on countback at Mutaz Barshim's What Gravity Challenge in Doha, Qatar on 10 May 2025, with the same height as Australia's Eleanor Patterson, who claimed second. She placed third in Stockholm at the 2025 BAUHAUS-galan event, part of the 2025 Diamond League, in June 2025. She was runner-up to Yaroslava Mahuchikh whilst competing for Poland at the 2025 European Athletics Team Championships First Division in Madrid, on 29 June 2025, after jumping 1.97 metres. With Nicola Olyslagers and Christina Honsel, she shared the win with 1.91 metres at the 2025 Athletissima in wet conditions in Lausanne.

She won the silver medal at the 2025 World Athletics Championships in Tokyo, Japan, in September 2025, clearing a personal best height of 2.00 metres.

=== 2026: European Championships silver medal ===
Continuing her good form into 2026, Zodzik equalled her indoor personal best of 1.98m to win the high jump at the Copernicus Cup in Toruń, and was crowned the overall winner of the high jump on the 2026 World Athletics Indoor Tour. She cleared 1.95 metres to win the 2026 Polish Indoor Championships. Competing at the 2026 World Athletics Indoor Championships in Poland, she placed fifth with a cleared height of 1.93 metres. In May, she jumped 1.94 m to place fourth at the 2026 Xiamen Diamond League.

On 15 August, she won the silver medal with a clearance of 1.95 metres at the 2026 European Championships in Birmingham, England.

== International competitions ==
Year	Competition	Venue	Position	Notes
Representing Belarus
2016	World U20 Championships	Bydgoszcz, Poland	15th (q)	1.77 m
2017	European U23 Championships	Bydgoszcz, Poland	5th	1.86 m
2019	European U23 Championships	Gävle, Sweden	18th (q)	1.73 m
Representing Poland
2024	Olympic Games	Paris, France	28th (q)	1.83 m
2025	World Championships	Tokyo, Japan	2nd	2.00 m
2026	World Indoor Championships	Toruń, Poland	5th	1.93 m
2026	European Championships	Birmingham, United Kingdom	2nd	1.95 m
2026	World Ultimate Championship	Budapest, Hungary	6th	1.86 m
