= Athletics at the 2026 Commonwealth Games – Women's high jump =

Women's high jump at the 2026 Commonwealth Games
- Venue: Scotstoun Stadium, Glasgow
- Dates: 27 July 2026 (qualification); 28 July 2026 (final)
- Winning height: 1.96 m =GR

Medalists
gold medal	Eleanor Patterson	Australia
silver medal	Nicola Olyslagers	Australia
bronze medal	Temitope Adeshina	Nigeria

The women's high jump at the 2026 Commonwealth Games, as part of the athletics programme, took place in the Scotstoun Stadium on 27 and 28 July 2026.

== Records ==
Prior to this competition, the existing world, Commonwealth and Commonwealth Games records were as follows:

Women's High jump
World record	2.10 m	Yaroslava Mahuchikh (UKR)	Stade Charléty, Paris	7 Jul 2024
Commonwealth record	2.06 m	Hestrie Cloete (RSA)	Saint-Denis, France	31 Aug 2003
Games record	1.96 m	Hestrie Cloete (RSA)	Manchester, England	30 Jul 2002

== Schedule ==
The schedule was as follows:

Date	Time	Round
28 July 2026	19:00	Final

All times are British Summer Time (UTC+1)

== Results ==
Place	Athlete	Nation	1.72	1.77	1.82	1.87	1.90	1.93	1.96	2.00	Result	Notes
1st place, gold medalist(s)	Eleanor Patterson	Australia	–	–	–	o	o	o	xxo	xxx	1.96	=GR
2nd place, silver medalist(s)	Nicola Olyslagers	Australia	–	—	—	xo	xxo	o	xxx		1.93	
3rd place, bronze medalist(s)	Temitope Adeshina	Nigeria	–	xo	o	xo	xxo	xxx			1.90	
4	Lamara Distin	Jamaica	–	o	o	xxo	xxx				1.87	
5	Elena Kulichenko	Cyprus	–	o	xo	xxx					1.82	
6	Rose Yeboah	Ghana	–	o	xxo	xxx					1.82	
7	Marguerite Lorenzo	Canada	o	xo	xxx						1.77	
8	Pooja Singh	India	xo	xo	xxx						1.77	
9	Sakari Famous	Bermuda	o	xxo	xxx						1.77	
10	Styliana Ioannidou	Cyprus	o	xxx							1.72	
–	Faith Kipsang	Kenya	xr								NM	
–	Morgan Lake	England	–	–	xxx						NM	
