= 2026 World Athletics Ultimate Championship – Women's high jump =

Women's high jump at the 2026 World Athletics Ultimate Championship
- Venue: National Athletics Centre
- Location: Budapest, Hungary
- Dates: 11 September 2026 (final)
- Competitors: 8 from 5 nations
- Winning time: 1.99 m

Champion
- Yaroslava Mahuchikh; Ukraine

The women's high jump was held as a straight final at the 2026 World Athletics Ultimate Championship at the National Athletics Centre in Budapest, Hungary on 11 September 2026. It was the first time the World Ultimate Championship is held. Athletes qualified by wildcard or by their world ranking.

== Background ==
Global records before the 2026 World Athletics Ultimate Championship
Record	Height	Athlete (nation)	Location	Date
World record	2.10 m	Yaroslava Mahuchikh (UKR)	Paris, France	7 July 2024
World lead	2.03 m i	Yaroslava Mahuchikh (UKR)	Lviv, Ukraine	17 January 2026

Area records before the 2026 World Athletics Ultimate Championship
Record	Height	Athlete (nation)	Location	Date
African record	2.06 m	Hestrie Cloete (RSA)	Paris, France	31 August 2003
Asian record	2.00 m	Nadezhda Dubovitskaya (KAZ)	Almaty, Kazakhstan	8 June 2021
European record	2.10 m	Yaroslava Mahuchikh (UKR)	Paris, France	7 July 2024
North, Central American, and Caribbean record	2.05 m	Chaunte Lowe (USA)	Des Moines, United States	26 June 2010
Oceanian record	2.04 m	Nicola Olyslagers (AUS)	Zurich, Switzerland	27 August 2025
South American record	1.96 m	Solange Witteveen (ARG)	Oristano, Italy	8 September 1997

== Qualification ==
For the high jump, eight athletes qualified, up to three by wildcard for winners of the event at the 2024 Summer Olympic, the 2025 World Athletics Championships, or the 2026 Diamond League final and the others by their position at the World Athletics Rankings for the event on 3 September 2026.

== Results ==
=== Final ===
The final was held on 11 September at 19:13 (UTC+2).

Place	Athlete	Nation	1.86	1.91	1.95	1.99	2.02	2.04	Result	Notes
1st place, gold medalist(s)	Yaroslava Mahuchikh	Ukraine	-	o	o	xo	-	xxx	1.99 m	Prize money $ 150,000
2	Nicola Olyslagers	Australia	-	o	xxo	xxx			1.95 m	Prize money $ 75,000
3	Eleanor Patterson	Australia	-	o	xxx				1.91 m	Prize money $ 40,000
3	Angelina Topić	Serbia	o	o	xxx				1.91 m	Prize money $ 40,000
5	Iryna Herashchenko	Ukraine	xo	xo	xxx				1.91 m	
6	Lamara Distin	Jamaica	o	xxx					1.86 m	
6	Yuliya Levchenko	Ukraine	o	xxx					1.86 m	
6	Maria Żodzik	Poland	o	xxx					1.86 m	
