= 2026 World Athletics Indoor Championships – Women's high jump =

Women's high jump at the 2026 World Athletics Indoor Championships
- Venue: Kujawsko-Pomorska Arena Toruń
- Location: Toruń, Poland
- Dates: 20 March
- Winning height: 2.01 m

Medalists
gold medal	Yaroslava Mahuchikh	Ukraine
silver medal	Angelina Topić	Serbia
silver medal	Nicola Olyslagers	Australia
silver medal	Yuliya Levchenko	Ukraine

The women's high jump at the 2026 World Athletics Indoor Championships took place on the short track of the Kujawsko-Pomorska Arena Toruń in Toruń, Poland, on 20 March 2026. This was the 22nd time the event was being contested at the World Athletics Indoor Championships. Athletes could qualify by achieving the entry standard or by their World Athletics Ranking in the event.

== Background ==
The women's high jump was contested 21 times before 2026, at every previous edition of the World Athletics Indoor Championships.

Records before the 2026 World Athletics Indoor Championships
Record	Athlete (nation)	Height (m)	Location	Date
World record	Yaroslava Mahuchikh (UKR)	2.10	Paris, France	7 July 2024
2026 World Lead	Yaroslava Mahuchikh (UKR)	2.03	Lviv, Ukraine	17 January 2026
Championship record	Stefka Kostadinova (BUL)	2.05	Indianapolis, United States	8 March 1987

== Qualification ==
For the women's high jump, the qualification period ran from 1 November 2025 until 8 March 2026. Athletes could qualify by achieving the entry standard of 1.96 m. Athletes could also qualify by virtue of their World Athletics Ranking for the event or by virtue of their World Athletics Indoor Tour wildcard. There is a target number of 12 athletes.

== Results ==
=== Final ===
The final was held on 20 March, starting at 11:39 (UTC+1) in the morning.

Four years after winning gold in Belgrade – which was also her first senior global title – Yaroslava Mahuchikh regained her women's high jump title.

Four women had perfect records up to and including 1.99m as Mahuchikh shared the lead with world champion Nicola Olyslagers, world bronze medallist Angelina Topic and Ukraine's Yuliya Levchenko.

The bar then went up to 2.01m and world record-holder Mahuchikh went clear on her first try. She was the only athlete to succeed at that height as her three remaining opponents bowed out to take a three-way share of the silver medal.

With the title secured, Mahuchikh attempted to break Stefka Kostadinova's championship record from 1987, albeit unsuccessfully. The Olympic champion had achieved her main goal of the championships, though, by claiming her fourth global title.

Place	Athlete	Nation	1.85	1.89	1.93	1.96	1.99	2.01	2.06	Result	Notes
1st place, gold medalist(s)	Yaroslava Mahuchikh	Ukraine	–	–	o	o	o	o	xxx	2.01	
2nd place, silver medalist(s)	Angelina Topić	Serbia	o	o	o	o	o	xxx		1.99	
2nd place, silver medalist(s)	Nicola Olyslagers	Australia	–	o	o	o	o	xxx		1.99	SB
2nd place, silver medalist(s)	Yuliya Levchenko	Ukraine	–	o	o	o	o	xxx		1.99	SB
5	Maria Żodzik	Poland	o	o	o	xxx				1.93	
6	Louise Ekman	Sweden	o	o	xo	xxx				1.93	
7	Eleanor Patterson	Australia	–	xo	xo	xxx				1.93	
8	Imke Onnen	Germany	o	o	xxx					1.89	
9	Charity Hufnagel	United States	o	xo	xxx					1.89	
10	Lamara Distin	Jamaica	o	xxx						1.85	
10	Marija Vuković	Montenegro	o	xxx						1.85	
