= 2024 World Athletics Indoor Championships – Women's high jump =

Women's high jump at the 2024 World Athletics Indoor Championships
- Venue: Commonwealth Arena
- Dates: 1 March
- Competitors: 11 from 10 nations
- Winning height: 1.99 m

Medalists
gold medal	Nicola Olyslagers	Australia
silver medal	Yaroslava Mahuchikh	Ukraine
bronze medal	Lia Apostolovski	Slovenia

The women's high jump at the 2024 World Athletics Indoor Championships took place on 1 March 2024. 2016 world indoor champion Vashti Cunningham of America was injured in warmups and did not start.

== Results ==
The final was started at 19:41.

Prior to the Championships, four women have cleared 2.00m or higher. 2020 Olympic silver medallist Nicola Olyslagers of Australia and the reigning world indoor and outdoor champion Yaroslava Mahuchikh have cleared 2.03m and 2.04m earlier in the season, respectively. A total of 11 women entered the final, with the 2016 world indoor champion Vashti Cunningham pulling out of the competition due to injury during the warmup.

In the final only 6 women cleared 1.92m. Germany's Christina Honsel and Slovenia's Lia Apostolovski both cleared 1.95m, with the latter equalling her PB from earlier in the season and securing a bronze medal on countback. Mahuchikh cleared 1.97m on her first attempt before three unsuccessful attempts at 1.99m. Olyslagers did clear 1.99m on her third attempt securing her the first global gold medal.

Rank	Athlete	Nationality	1.84	1.88	1.92	1.95	1.97	1.99	2.02	Result	Notes
1st place, gold medalist(s)	Nicola Olyslagers	Australia	–	o	o	o	xo	xxo	xxx	1.99	
2nd place, silver medalist(s)	Yaroslava Mahuchikh	Ukraine	–	–	o	o	o	xxx		1.97	
3rd place, bronze medalist(s)	Lia Apostolovski	Slovenia	o	o	o	o	x–	r		1.95	PB
4	Christina Honsel	Germany	o	xo	xo	o	xxx			1.95	SB
5	Angelina Topić	Serbia	o	xo	xxo	x–	xx			1.92	
6	Morgan Lake	Great Britain	xo	xxo	xxo	x–	xx			1.92	SB
7	Tatiana Gusin	Greece	xo	o	xxx					1.88	
8	Nadezhda Dubovitskaya	Kazakhstan	o	xxo	xxx					1.88	
9	Yuliia Levchenko	Ukraine	o	xxx						1.84	
	Daniela Stanciu	Romania	xxx							NM	
	Vashti Cunningham	United States								DNS	
