= 2025 World Athletics Indoor Championships – Women's high jump =

Women's high jump at the 2025 World Athletics Indoor Championships
- Venue: Nanjing's Cube at Nanjing Youth Olympic Sports Park
- Location: Nanjing, China
- Dates: 23 March
- Competitors: 10 from 7 nations
- Winning height: 1.97 m

Medalists
gold medal	Nicola Olyslagers	Australia
silver medal	Eleanor Patterson	Australia
bronze medal	Yaroslava Mahuchikh	Ukraine

The women's high jump at the 2025 World Athletics Indoor Championships took place on the short track of the Nanjing's Cube at Nanjing Youth Olympic Sports Park in Nanjing, China, on 23 March 2025. This was the 21st time the event is contested at the World Athletics Indoor Championships. Athletes could qualify by achieving the entry standard or by their World Athletics Ranking in the event.

The final took place on 23 March during the morning session.

== Background ==
The women's high jump was contested 20 times before 2025, at every previous edition of the World Athletics Indoor Championships.

Records before the 2025 World Athletics Indoor Championships
Record	Athlete (nation)	Height (m)	Location	Date
World record	Yaroslava Mahuchikh (UKR)	2.10	Paris, France	7 July 2024
Championship record	Stefka Kostadinova (BUL)	2.05	Indianapolis, United States	8 March 1987
World leading	Yaroslava Mahuchikh (UKR)	2.01	Banská Bystrica, Slovakia	18 February 2025

== Qualification ==
For the women's high jump, the qualification period ran from 1 September 2024 until 9 March 2025. Athletes could qualify by achieving the entry standards of 1.97 m. Athletes could also qualify by virtue of their World Athletics Ranking for the event or by virtue of their World Athletics Indoor Tour wildcard. There was a target number of 12 athletes.

== Final ==
The final was held on 23 March, starting at 11:35 (UTC+8) in the morning.

Place	Athlete	Nation	1.85	1.89	1.92	1.95	1.97	1.99	Result	Notes
1st place, gold medalist(s)	Nicola Olyslagers	Australia	–	o	o	o	o	xxx	1.97 m	SB
2nd place, silver medalist(s)	Eleanor Patterson	Australia	–	o	xo	o	o	xxx	1.97 m	
3rd place, bronze medalist(s)	Yaroslava Mahuchikh	Ukraine	–	o	–	o	x–	xx	1.95 m	
4	Angelina Topić	Serbia	o	o	o	xo	x–	xx	1.95 m	
5	Charity Hufnagel	United States	o	o	o	xxx			1.92 m	
6	Imke Onnen	Germany	o	xo	o	xxx			1.92 m	
7	Elena Kulichenko	Cyprus	o	xxo	xxo	xxx			1.92 m	
8	Idea Pieroni	Italy	xo	xo	xxx				1.89 m	
9	Kateryna Tabashnyk	Ukraine	xo	xxo	xxx				1.89 m	
10	Vashti Cunningham	United States	o	xxx					1.85 m	
