= Angelina Topić =

Serbian high jumper (born 2005)

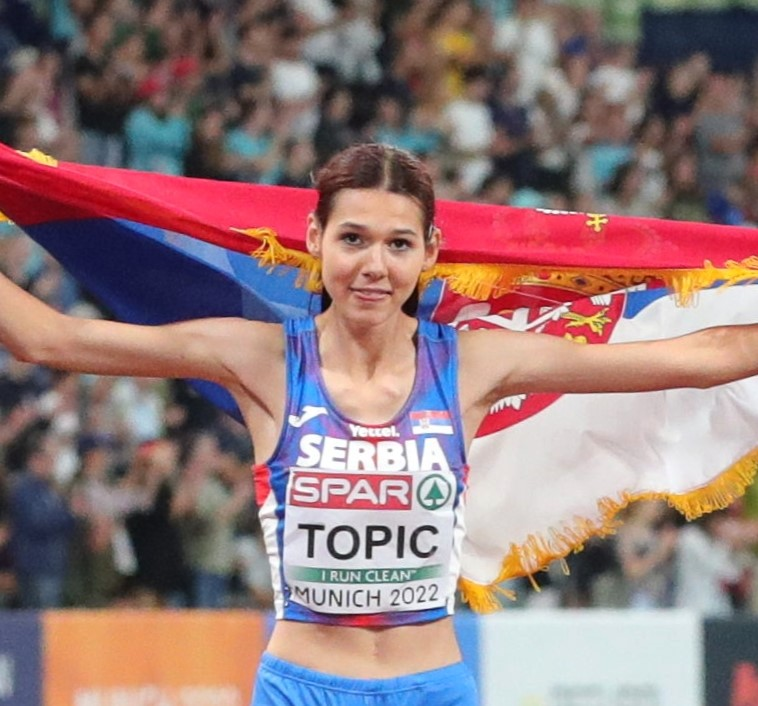
- Topić in 2022

Personal information
- Nationality: Serbian
- Born: 26 July 2005 (age 21) Belgrade, Serbia and Montenegro
- Height: 1.83 m (6 ft 0 in)
- Weight: 59 kg (130 lb)

Sport
- Country: Serbia
- Sport: Athletics
- Events: High jump Long jump
- Coached by: Dragutin Topić

Achievements and titles
- Personal bests: 2.00 m (6 ft 6 1/2 in) NR (2026)
Medal record
Women's athletics
Representing Serbia
World Championships
Bronze medal – third place	2025 Tokyo	High jump
World Ultimate Championship
Third place	2026 Budapest	High jump
World Indoor Championships
Silver medal – second place	2026 Toruń	High jump
European Championships
Silver medal – second place	2024 Rome	High jump
Bronze medal – third place	2022 Munich	High jump
European Indoor Championships
Silver medal – second place	2025 Apeldoorn	High jump
Diamond League
Third place	2023	High jump
World U20 Championships
Gold medal – first place	2024 Lima	High jump
Bronze medal – third place	2022 Cali	High jump
European U23 Championships
Gold medal – first place	2025 Bergen	High jump
European U20 Championships
Gold medal – first place	2023 Jerusalem	High jump
European U18 Championships
Gold medal – first place	2022 Jerusalem	High jump

Angelina Topić (Serbian Cyrillic: Ангелина Топић; born 26 July 2005) is a Serbian athlete specializing in the high jump. At the age of 17, she won the bronze medal at the 2022 European Athletics Championships, becoming the youngest medalist of the entire championships. The same year, Topić earned also bronze at the World Under-20 Championships. She won silver medal at the 2024 European Athletics Championships and bronze at the 2025 World Athletics Championships.

Topić is the current Serbian record holder for the high jump indoors and out (with 2.00 m), and also holds joint world U18 best outdoors (with 1.96m).

== Background ==
Angelina Topić's mother is Biljana Topić, the Serbian triple jump record holder, who was fourth in the event at the 2009 World Championships in Athletics. Her coach is her father Dragutin Topić, the Serbian high jump record holder and European high jump champion, a title he won as a teenager in 1990.

== Career ==
In her breakthrough 2022 season in June, still only 16, Topić set a national senior high jump record of 1.96 m at the Serbian Championships in Kruševac, equalling the world under-18 best. The following month, she won the high jump event at the European Under-18 Championships in Jerusalem with a leap of 1.92 m. In August, she went on to take the bronze medal at the World U20 Championships held in Cali, Colombia, clearing 1.93 m. At her first major senior competition the same month, Topić earned bronze at the Munich European Championships with a jump of 1.93 m, becoming the youngest medallist of the entire championships. She also set national records at U18 & U20 levels in the pentathlon that year.

In January 2023, she broke the Serbian indoor high jump record (previously held by Ivana Španović) with a jump of 1.94 m at a meeting in Belgrade.

At the 2024 European Athletics Championships in June, Topić won the silver medal in high jump with the height of 1.97 m. She also competed in long jump but did not qualify for the finals. At the 2024 Paris Olympics in August, she fractured her right ankle during warm-up for the qualifying session. Injured, she still qualified, but later had to withdraw from the high jump final. Later in August 2024, less than a month after the injury, she won the gold medal at the 2024 World Athletics U20 Championships.

In March 2025, Topić won silver in high jump at the 2025 European Athletics Indoor Championships. Later in March, she was fourth at the 2025 World Athletics Indoor Championships. In July, she won gold medal at the 2025 European Athletics U23 Championships. At the 2025 World Athletics Championships in September, Topić won a joint bronze medal with Ukrainian Yaroslava Mahuchikh with the height of 1.97 m. In February 2026, Topić set a new Serbian record with 2.00 m at Banská Bystrica, Slovakia.

== Achievements ==
=== International competitions ===
Representing Serbia
Year	Competition	Venue	Position	Event	Result
2021	Balkan U20 Indoor Championships	Sofia, Bulgaria	2nd	High jump	1.82 m
2021	Balkan U20 Championships	Istanbul, Turkey	1st	High jump	1.88 m
2021	European Team Championships Third League	Limassol, Cyprus	2nd	High jump	1.85 m
2021	Balkan Championships	Smederevo, Serbia	10th	High jump	1.82 m
2021	European U20 Championships	Tallinn, Estonia	8th	High jump	1.83 m
2021	Balkan U18 Championships	Kraljevo, Serbia	1st	High jump	1.83 m
2021	World U20 Championships	Nairobi, Kenya	6th	High jump	1.84 m
2022	Balkan U20 Indoor Championships	Belgrade, Serbia	1st	High jump	1.86 m
2022	World Indoor Championships	Belgrade, Serbia	9th	High jump	1.88 m
2022	Balkan U18 Championships	Bar, Montenegro	1st	High jump	1.90 m
2022	European U18 Championships	Jerusalem, Israel	1st	High jump	1.92 m
2022	World U20 Championships	Cali, Colombia	3rd	High jump	1.93 m
2022	European Championships	Munich, Germany	3rd	High jump	1.93 m
2023	European Indoor Championships	Istanbul, Turkey	4th	High jump	1.94 m
2023	European Team Championships	Kraków, Poland	5th	High jump	1.91 m
2023	European U20 Championships	Jerusalem, Israel	1st	High jump	1.90 m
2023	European U20 Championships	Jerusalem, Israel	6th	Long jump	6.42 m
2023	World Championships	Budapest, Hungary	7th	High jump	1.94 m
2023	Diamond League	Eugene, United States	3rd	High jump	1.95 m
2024	World Indoor Championships	Glasgow, United Kingdom	5th	High jump	1.92 m
2024	European Championships	Rome, Italy	2nd	High jump	1.97 m
2024	European Championships	Rome, Italy	26th (q)	Long jump	6.29 m
2024	Olympic Games	Paris, France	12th (q)	High jump	1.92 m^{1}
2024	World U20 Championships	Lima, Peru	1st	High jump	1.91 m
2024	Diamond League	Brussels, Belgium	5th	High jump	1.88 m
2025	European Indoor Championships	Apeldoorn, Netherlands	2nd	High jump	1.95 m
2025	World Indoor Championships	Nanjing, China	4th	High jump	1.95 m
2025	European U23 Championships	Bergen, Norway	1st	High jump	1.95 m
2025	Balkan Athletics Championships	Volos, Greece	1st	High jump	1.93 m
2025	World Championships	Tokyo, Japan	3rd	High jump	1.97 m
2026	World Indoor Championships	Torun, Poland	2nd	High jump	1.99 m
2026	European Championships	Birmingham, United Kingdom	12th	High jump	1.83 m
2026	World Ultimate Championship	Budapest, Hungary	3rd	High jump	1.91 m

^{1}Did not start in the final.

=== Personal bests ===
Event	Performance	Location	Date	Note
High jump (outdoor)	2.00 m	Banská Bystrica, Slovakia	24 February 2026	NR
Pentathlon (indoor)	3745	Belgrade, Serbia	23 January 2022	NU20R
Pentathlon girls (indoor)	3779	Belgrade, Serbia	18 December 2021	NU18R
Long jump (indoor)	6.57 m	Belgrade, Serbia	24 January 2024	NU20R NR

=== National titles ===
- Serbian Athletics Championships: 2021, 2022
- Serbian Indoor Athletics Championships: 2021

=== Seasonal bests by year ===
Line chart showing Angelina Topić's annual high jump bests, 2018–2024.

- 2018 – 1.60
- 2019 – 1.71
- 2020 – 1.81
- 2021 – 1.88
- 2022 – 1.96
- 2023 – 1.97
- 2024 – 1.98
- 2026 – 2.00

== Awards ==
2022

- Piotr Nurowski Best Summer European Young Athlete Prize

2025

- Sportswoman of The Year by the Olympic Committee of Serbia

== See also ==
- Serbian records in athletics
