= 2022 World Athletics Indoor Championships – Women's high jump =

Women's high jump at the 2022 World Athletics Indoor Championships
- Venue: Štark Arena
- Dates: 19 March
- Competitors: 12 from 10 nations
- Winning height: 2.02

Medalists
gold medal	Yaroslava Mahuchikh	Ukraine
silver medal	Eleanor Patterson	Australia
bronze medal	Nadezhda Dubovitskaya	Kazakhstan

The women's high jump at the 2022 World Athletics Indoor Championships took place on 19 March 2022.

== Results ==
The final was started at 11:05.

Rank	Athlete	Nationality	1.84	1.88	1.92	1.95	1.98	2.00	2.02	2.04	Result	Notes
1st place, gold medalist(s)	Yaroslava Mahuchikh	Ukraine	–	o	xo	o	o	xxo	o	xxx	2.02	WL
2nd place, silver medalist(s)	Eleanor Patterson	Australia	o	o	o	o	xo	o	x–	xx	2.00	AR
3rd place, bronze medalist(s)	Nadezhda Dubovitskaya	Kazakhstan	o	o	o	o	o	xxx			1.98	=AR
4	Marija Vuković	Montenegro	xo	o	xo	o	xxx				1.95	
5	Iryna Herashchenko	Ukraine	o	o	o	xxx					1.92	
6	Elena Vallortigara	Italy	o	o	xxo	xxx					1.92	SB
6	Safina Sadullayeva	Uzbekistan	o	o	xo	xxx					1.92	
8	Mirela Demireva	Bulgaria	o	o	xxx						1.88	
9	Angelina Topić	Serbia	o	xo	xxx						1.88	
10	Svetlana Radzivil	Uzbekistan	xo	xxx							1.84	
10	Emily Borthwick	Great Britain	xo	xxx							1.84	
12	Rachel McCoy	United States	xxo	xxx							1.84	
