= Charity Hufnagel =

American athlete (born 2001)

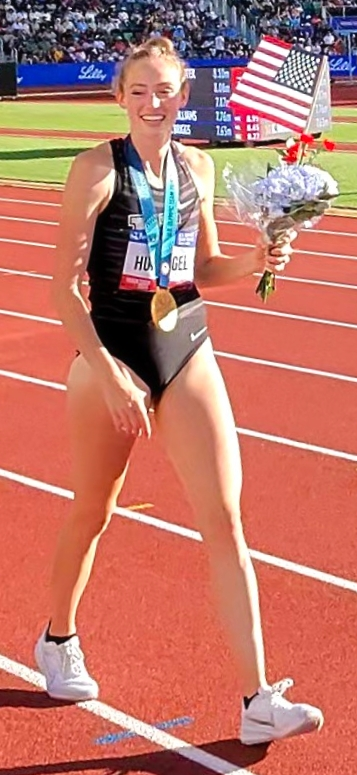
- Hufnagel at the 2024 United States Olympic trials

Personal information
- Nationality: American
- Born: Charity Griffith; 18 June 2001 (age 25)

Sport
- Sport: Athletics
- Events: High Jump, Heptathlon, Pentathlon

Achievements and titles
- Personal bests: High jump: 1.96 (Madrid, 2026); Heptathlon: 5914 (Gainesville, 2024); Pentathlon: 4218 (Fayetteville, 2024)

Charity Hufnagel (née Griffith) (born 18 June 2001) is an American high jumper and multi-event athlete. She won the high jump at the 2026 USA Indoor Track and Field Championships. She represented the United States at the 2025 World Athletics Indoor Championships, placing fifth in the high jump.

== Early life ==
Hufnagel attended Ball State University in Muncie, Indiana before transferring to the University of Kentucky.

== Career ==
Competing as Charity Griffith in 2022, she finished fifth in the NCAA Outdoor Championship high jump competition.

In 2023, she was named the Most Valuable Performer of the 2023 Mid-American Conference Indoor track Championships and won titles in the pentathlon and the high jump. In June 2023, she won the high jump competition at the NCAA Outdoor Championship held in Austin, Texas. To do so, she set a new personal best height of 1.93m to upset defending champion and 2022 Commonwealth Games gold medalist Lamara Distin.

She won the pentathlon at the Southeastern Conference Indoor Championships in Fayetteville, Arkansas in February 2024. She finished second in the heptathlon at the SEC Outdoor Championships in May 2024, with a personal best tally of 5914 points, in Gainesville, Florida. She won the high jump at the 2024 United States Olympic trials with a clearance of 1.94 metres.

Hufnagel was runner-up in the high jump at the 2025 USA Indoor Championships with a jump of 1.94 metres. She was subsequently selected for the 2025 World Athletics Indoor Championships in Nanjing in March 2025, placing fifth with a clearance of 1.92 metres. In August, she placed fourth at the USA Outdoor Championships, with a best clearance of 1.88 metres.

In February 2026, Hufnagel set a new personal best of 1.96 metres to win on the World Athletics Indoor Tour in Madrid, Spain. Later that month, she won the high jump at the 2026 USA Indoor Track and Field Championships defeating nine-time defending champion Vashti Cunningham with a jump of 1.96 metres. She was selected to represent the United States at the 2026 World Athletics Indoor Championships in Toruń, Poland, placing ninth overall. In May, she placed sixth at the 2026 Xiamen Diamond League, and also had a sixth place finish in the 2026 Diamond League meeting in Rabat. On 26 July, she cleared 1.89 metres for a second place finish at the 2026 USA Championships in New York.

== Personal life ==
She married Noah Hufnagel in July 2023, and took on the surname Hufnagel.

=== International competitions ===
Representing the United States
Year	Competition	Venue	Position	Event	Time
2025	World Athletics Indoor Championships	Nanjing, China	5th	High jump	1.92 m (6 ft 3 1/2 in)
2026	World Athletics Indoor Championships	Toruń, Poland	9th	High jump	1.89 m (6 ft 2 1/4 in)
