= 2022 European Athletics Championships – Women's high jump =

Women's high jump at the 2022 European Athletics Championships
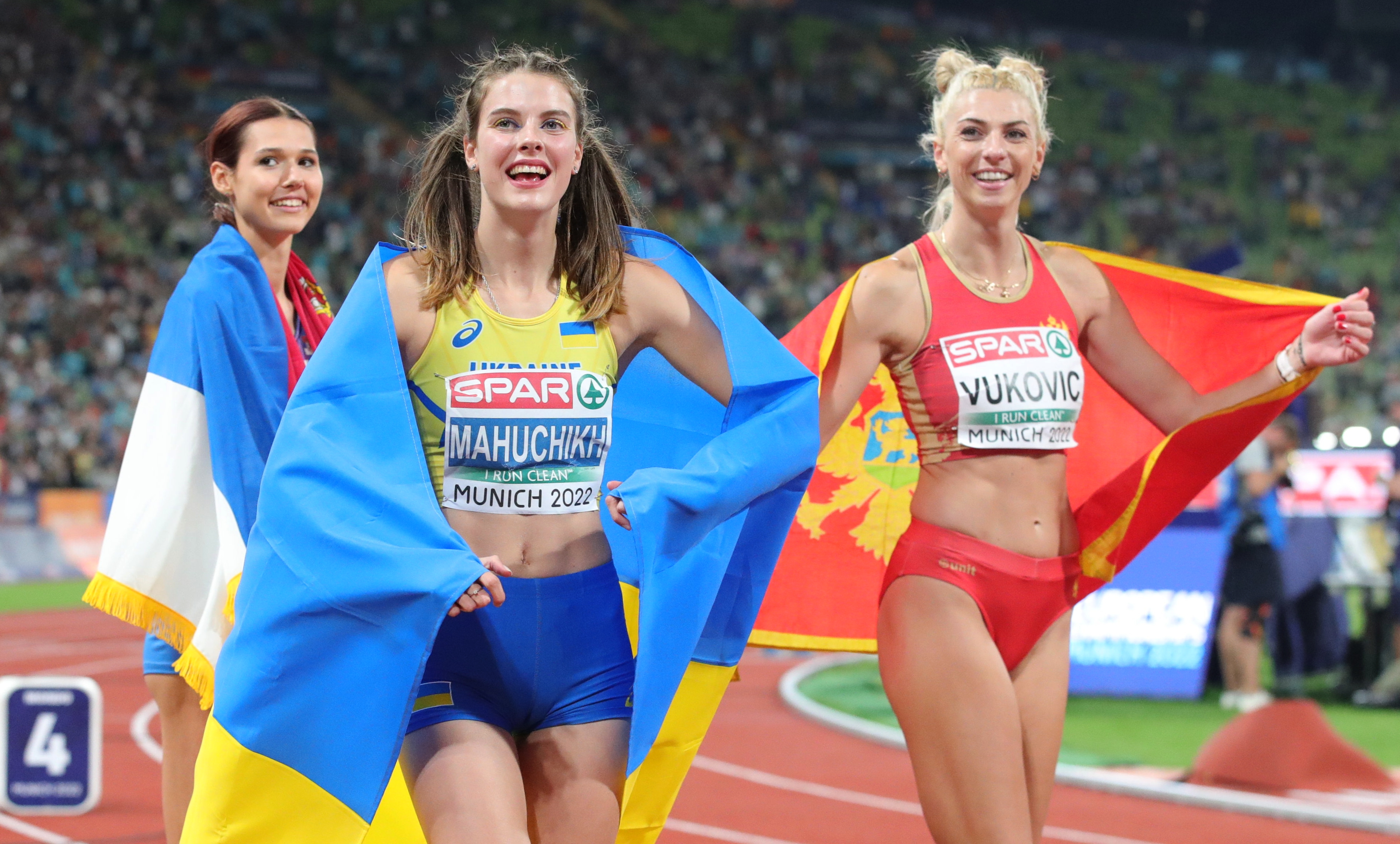
- The medalists shortly after the event.
- Venue: Olympic Stadium
- Location: Munich
- Dates: 19 August (qualification); 21 August (final)
- Competitors: 24 from 17 nations
- Winning height: 1.95 m

Medalists
gold medal	Yaroslava Mahuchikh	Ukraine
silver medal	Marija Vuković	Montenegro
bronze medal	Angelina Topić	Serbia

The women's high jump at the 2022 European Athletics Championships took place at the Olympic Stadium on 19 & 21 August 2022.

== Records ==
Standing records prior to the 2022 European Athletics Championships
World record	Stefka Kostadinova (BUL)	2.09 m	Rome, Italy	30 August 1987
European record	Stefka Kostadinova (BUL)	2.09 m	Rome, Italy	30 August 1987
Championship record	Tia Hellebaut (BEL)	2.03 m	Gothenburg, Sweden	11 August 2006
World Leading	Yaroslava Mahuchikh (UKR)	2.03 m	Brno, Czech Republic	22 June 2022
European Leading	Yaroslava Mahuchikh (UKR)	2.03 m	Brno, Czech Republic	22 June 2022

== Schedule ==
Date	Time	Round
19 August 2022	10:05	Qualification
21 August 2022	19:05	Final

All times are local times (UTC+2)

== Results ==
In the absence of Mariya Lasitskene, Yaroslava Mahuchikh of Ukraine was the overwhelming favourite, going into the Championships with her season's best of 2.03m. Iryna Herashchenko of Ukraine and bronze medallist of the 2022 World Athletics Championships Italy's Elena Vallortigara were the only other competitors in the field who cleared 2.00m earlier in the season. In the final only two athletes cleared 1.95m, with Mahuchikh securing the win on countback and Montenegro's Marija Vuković finally winning her first major international medal with silver. 17-year-old Angelina Topić took bronze. The winning height of 1.95m was the lowest in Championships' history since 1974.

=== Qualification ===
Qualification: 1.94 m (Q) or best 12 performances (q).

Rank	Group	Name	Nationality	1.78	1.83	1.87	1.91	1.94	Result	Notes
1	B	Lia Apostolovski	Slovenia	o	o	o			1.87	q
1	B	Marie-Laurence Jungfleisch	Germany	o	o	o			1.87	q, =SB
1	A	Angelina Topić	Serbia	o	o	o			1.87	q
1	A	Marija Vuković	Montenegro	o	o	o			1.87	q
5	B	Iryna Herashchenko	Ukraine	o	xo	o			1.87	q
5	B	Tatiana Gusin	Greece	xo	o	o			1.87	q
5	B	Elena Vallortigara	Italy	xo	o	o			1.87	q
5	A	Britt Weerman	Netherlands	xo	o	o			1.87	q
9	A	Mirela Demireva	Bulgaria	o	o	xo			1.87	q
9	B	Morgan Lake	Great Britain	o	o	xo			1.87	q
9	A	Yaroslava Mahuchikh	Ukraine	–	–	xo			1.87	q
12	B	Solène Gicquel	France	xo	xo	xo			1.87	q
13	B	Yuliya Levchenko	Ukraine	o	xxo	xo			1.87	q
14	B	Daniela Stanciu	Romania	o	o	xxx			1.83	
15	B	Karmen Bruus	Estonia	o	xo	xxx			1.83	
15	A	Maja Nilsson	Sweden	o	xo	xxx			1.83	
15	A	Heta Tuuri	Finland	o	xo	xxx			1.83	
18	A	Bianca Stichling	Germany	o	xxo	xxx			1.83	
19	B	Urtė Baikštytė	Lithuania	o	xxx				1.78	
19	A	Erika Furlani	Italy	o	xxx				1.78	
19	A	Ella Junnila	Finland	o	xxx				1.78	
19	A	Barbara Szabó	Hungary	o	xxx				1.78	
23	B	Sini Lällä	Finland	xo	xxx				1.78	
	A	Laura Zialor	Great Britain	xxx					NM	

=== Final ===
Rank	Name	Nationality	1.82	1.86	1.90	1.93	1.95	1.97	1.99	2.01	Result	Notes
1st place, gold medalist(s)	Yaroslava Mahuchikh	Ukraine	–	o	o	–	o	xxx			1.95	
2nd place, silver medalist(s)	Marija Vuković	Montenegro	–	o	o	o	xxo	xxx			1.95	
3rd place, bronze medalist(s)	Angelina Topić	Serbia	o	o	o	o	xxx				1.93	
4	Britt Weerman	Netherlands	o	xo	xo	o	xxx				1.93	
5	Iryna Herashchenko	Ukraine	o	xo	o	xxo	xxx				1.93	
6	Marie-Laurence Jungfleisch	Germany	o	o	xo	xxx					1.90	SB
7	Lia Apostolovski	Slovenia	o	o	xxo	xxx					1.90	
7	Morgan Lake	Great Britain	o	o	xxo	xxx					1.90	
9	Mirela Demireva	Bulgaria	o	o	xxx						1.86	
9	Tatiana Gusin	Greece	o	o	xxx						1.86	
9	Yuliya Levchenko	Ukraine	o	o	xxx						1.86	
9	Elena Vallortigara	Italy	o	o	xxx						1.86	
13	Solène Gicquel	France	o	xo	xxx						1.86	
