= Tetiana Stepanova =

High jump coach

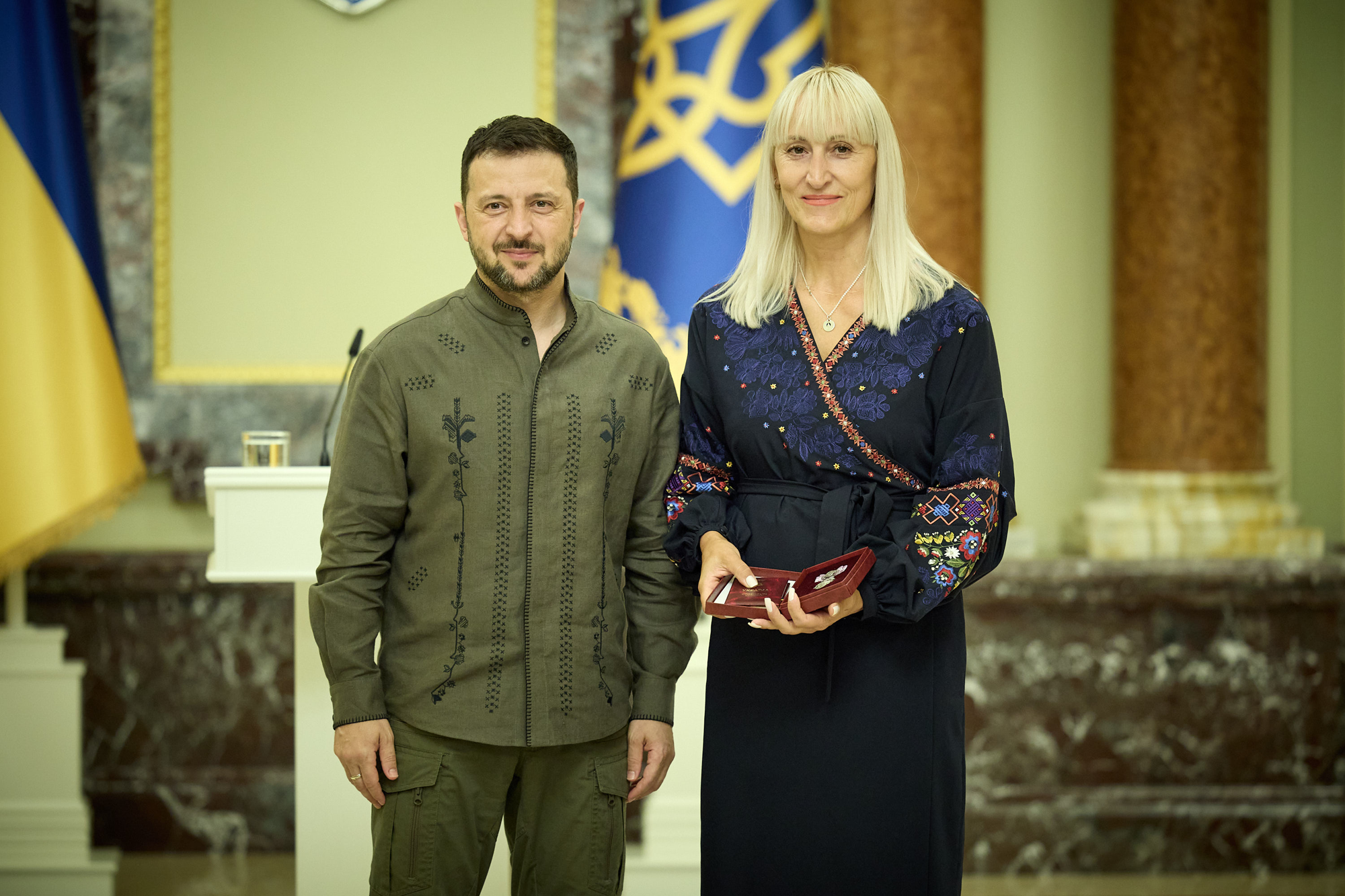
- Tetiana Stepanova (right) with Ukrainian president Volodymyr Zelenskyy in 2024

Personal information
- Native name: Тетяна Володимирівна Степанова
- Nationality: Ukrainian
- Citizenship: Ukraine
- Born: 2 November 1966 (age 59) Dnepropetrovsk, Ukrainian SSR, Soviet Union (now - Dnipro, Ukraine)
- Education: Dnipro State Academy of Physical Culture and Sports
- Occupation: Personal trainer

Sport
- Sport: High jump (coach)

Tetiana Volodymyrivna Stepanova (née Karpenko) (Ukrainian: Тетяна Володимирівна Степанова (Карпенко); born 2 November 1966) is the Ukrainian high jump and hurdling coach. She is known as a personal coach of Yaroslava Mahuchikh.

== Biography ==
Tetiana Stepanova was born on 2 November 1966 in Dnipro, Ukraine. In the past, she was a former international 400 metres hurdler and a Candidate for Master of Sport of the Soviet Union in this discipline. She was a pupil of hurdling coach Oleh Zaichenko.

She finished the Dnipro State Academy of Physical Culture and Sports.

In 2011, Stepanova began to work in the sports school No. 3 in Dnipro, where her future pupil Yaroslava Mahuchikh was training. At first she was one of two coaches of Yaroslava (with Olena Kutsenko), while future world record holder didn't choose Stepanova later.

In 2015, Stepanova was a coach of Mykyta Chesak, 400 metres hurdler and a finalist of 2015 European Athletics Junior Championships.

In 2018, Tetiana Stepanova received a European Athletics Coach Award from to European Athletics.

In 2021, during Yaroslava's controversy, connected with her hug with Olympic champion and Russian army representative Mariya Lasitskene during 2020 Summer Olympics final, Tetiana Stepanova wanted to finish her coaching career in Ukraine and move to Germany, Russia, Cyprus or Austria, who proposed to work as a high jump coach, but later she decided to represent her country.

== Personal life ==
Stepanova is married to Serhii Stepanov, a high jump coach, who joined the coaching team after the full-scale invasion in 2022 to help with strength training. They have a son Nazar, a Ukrainian hurdler and a national record holder, who is engaged to Yaroslava Mahuchikh.

== Recognition and state awards ==
- European Athletics Coach Award recipient (2018)
- Best Rising Star Athlete Coach of the Year according to Ukrainian Athletic Federation (2018)
- Best Athlete Coach of the Year according to Ukrainian Athletic Federation (2019, 2021)
- Merited Coach of Ukraine (2018)
- Honored Worker of Physical Culture and Sports of Ukraine (2021)
- Best Athlete Coach of the Year according to National Olympic Committee of Ukraine (2023, 2024)
- Best Athlete Coach of the Year according to Ukrainian Sports Press Association (2023, 2024)
- Member 3rd Class of the Order of Princess Olga (2024)
