= 2024 European Athletics Championships – Women's high jump =

Women's high jump at the 2024 European Athletics Championships
- Venue: Stadio Olimpico
- Location: Rome
- Dates: 7 June (qualification); 9 June (final)
- Competitors: 30 from 20 nations
- Winning height: 2.01 m

Medalists
gold medal	Yaroslava Mahuchikh	Ukraine
silver medal	Angelina Topić	Serbia
bronze medal	Iryna Herashchenko	Ukraine

The women's high jump at the 2024 European Athletics Championships took place at the Stadio Olimpico on 7 and 9 June.

== Records ==
Standing records prior to the 2024 European Athletics Championships
World record	Stefka Kostadinova (BUL)	2.09 m	Rome, Italy	30 August 1987
European record	Stefka Kostadinova (BUL)	2.09 m	Rome, Italy	30 August 1987
Championship record	Tia Hellebaut (BEL)	2.03 m	Gothenburg, Sweden	11 August 2006
Championship record	Venelina Veneva-Mateeva (BUL)	2.03 m	Gothenburg, Sweden	11 August 2006
Championship record	Blanka Vlašić (CRO)	2.03 m	Barcelona, Spain	1 August 2010
World Leading	Yaroslava Mahuchikh (UKR)	2.04 m	Cottbus, Germany	31 January 2024
Europe Leading	Yaroslava Mahuchikh (UKR)	2.04 m	Cottbus, Germany	31 January 2024

== Schedule ==
Date	Time	Round
7 June 2024	20:30	Qualification
9 June 2024	20:30	Final

All times are local times (UTC+2)

== Results ==
=== Qualification ===
Qualification: 1.92 m (Q) or best 12 performances (q).

Rank	Group	Name	Nationality	1.76	1.81	1.85	1.89	1.92	Result	Notes
1	B	Christina Honsel	Germany	-	o	o	o	o	1.92	Q
1	A	Yaroslava Mahuchikh	Ukraine	-	-	-	o	o	1.92	Q
1	B	Ella Junnila	Finland	-	o	o	o	o	1.92	Q, SB
4	B	Iryna Herashchenko	Ukraine	-	o	o	xo	o	1.92	Q
5	A	Angelina Topić	Serbia	-	o	o	o	xo	1.92	Q
6	B	Nawal Meniker	France	-	o	xo	o	xxo	1.92	Q, =SB
7	A	Mirela Demireva	Bulgaria	-	o	o	o	xxr	1.89	q
7	A	Morgan Lake	Great Britain	-	-	xo	o	xxr	1.89	q
7	A	Imke Onnen	Germany	-	xo	o	o	xxr	1.89	q
7	B	Lia Apostolovski	Slovenia	-	o	xo	o	xxx	1.89	q
11	A	Buse Savaşkan	Turkey	-	o	o	xo	xxr	1.89	q
11	A	Maja Nilsson	Sweden	-	-	o	xo	xr	1.89	q
13	B	Airinė Palšytė	Lithuania	o	o	o	xxo	xxx	1.89	
14	B	Tatiana Gusin	Greece	o	o	xo	xxo	xxx	1.89	
15	B	Fédra Fekete	Hungary	o	o	o	xxx		1.85	
15	A	Elena Vallortigara	Italy	-	o	o	xxx		1.85	
15	A	Yuliya Chumachenko	Ukraine	-	o	o	xxx		1.85	
18	A	Heta Tuuri	Finland	o	xo	o	xxx		1.85	
19	B	Michaela Hrubá	Czech Republic	o	o	xo	xxx		1.85	
19	A	Elisabeth Pihela	Estonia	o	o	xo	xxx		1.85	
19	A	Solène Gicquel	France	-	o	xo	xxx		1.85	
19	B	Merel Maes	Belgium	o	o	xo	xxx		1.85	
23	B	Yuliia Levchenko	Ukraine	o	xo	xo	xxx		1.81	
24	B	Salome Lang	Switzerland	o	o	xxx			1.81	
25	B	Aurora Vicini	Italy	xxo	o	xxx			1.81	
26	A	Urtė Baikštytė	Lithuania	o	xo	xxx			1.81	
26	B	Ellen Ekholm	Sweden	o	xo	xxx			1.81	
28	A	Panagiota Dosi	Greece	xo	xxo	xxx			1.81	
29	B	Paulina Borys	Poland	o	xxx				1.76	
	A	Marija Vuković	Montenegro	xxx					NM	

=== Final ===
Rank	Name	Nationality	1.82	1.86	1.90	1.93	1.95	1.97	1.99	2.01	2.03	2.05	Result	Notes
1st place, gold medalist(s)	Yaroslava Mahuchikh	Ukraine	-	-	o	-	o	o	o	xo			2.01	
2nd place, silver medalist(s)	Angelina Topić	Serbia	-	o	o	xo	o	xxo	-	xxx			1.97	
3rd place, bronze medalist(s)	Iryna Herashchenko	Ukraine	o	o	xo	xxo	xo	xxx					1.95	=SB
4	Mirela Demireva	Bulgaria	o	o	o	o	xxx						1.93	=SB
5	Ella Junnila	Finland	o	o	o	xo	xxx						1.93	SB
6	Morgan Lake	Great Britain	-	o	o	xxx							1.90	
6	Nawal Meniker	France	o	o	o	xxx							1.90	
8	Imke Onnen	Germany	o	xo	o	xxx							1.90	
9	Lia Apostolovski	Slovenia	o	o	xo	xxx							1.90	
10	Buse Savaşkan	Turkey	o	o	xxx								1.86	
11	Christina Honsel	Germany	xo	o	xxx								1.86	
12	Maja Nilsson	Sweden	-	xo	xxx								1.86	
