= Yaroslava Mahuchikh =

Ukrainian high jumper (born 2001)

- Mahuchikh at the Wanda Diamond League’s 2026 Weltklasse Zürich.

Personal information
- Native name: Ярослава Олексіївна Магучіх
- Full name: Yaroslava Oleksiivna Mahuchikh
- Nationality: Ukrainian
- Born: 19 September 2001 (age 25) Dnipropetrovsk, Ukraine
- Height: 1.80 m (5 ft 11 in)
- Weight: 55 kg (121 lb)

Sport
- Country: Ukraine
- Sport: Athletics
- Event: High jump
- Club: Central Sports Club of the Armed Forces
- Coached by: Tetiana Stepanova (2013–present); Serhii Stepanov(2022–present)

Achievements and titles
- Highest world ranking: 1st (2022-2025)
- Personal bests: High jump: Outdoor; 2.10 m (6 ft 10 1/2 in) WR (Paris 2024): Indoor; 2.06 m (6 ft 9 in) NR (Banská Bystrica 2021)
Medal record
Senior level
Event	1st	2nd	3rd
Olympic Games	1	0	1
World Championships	1	2	1
World Ultimate Championship	1	0	0
World Indoor Championships	2	1	1
Diamond League Final	3	3	0
World Athletics Indoor Tour	1	0	0
European Championships	3	0	0
European Indoor Championships	3	0	0
European Games	1	0	0
Total	16	6	3
Women's athletics
Representing Ukraine
Olympic Games
Gold medal – first place	2024 Paris	High jump
Bronze medal – third place	2020 Tokyo	High jump
World Championships
Gold medal – first place	2023 Budapest	High jump
Silver medal – second place	2019 Doha	High jump
Silver medal – second place	2022 Eugene	High jump
Bronze medal – third place	2025 Tokyo	High jump
World Ultimate Championship
First place	2026 Budapest	High jump
World Indoor Championships
Gold medal – first place	2022 Belgrade	High jump
Gold medal – first place	2026 Toruń	High jump
Silver medal – second place	2024 Glasgow	High jump
Bronze medal – third place	2025 Nanjing	High jump
Diamond League Final
First place	2022	High jump
First place	2023	High jump
First place	2024	High jump
Second place	2021	High jump
Second place	2025	High jump
Second place	2026	High jump
World Athletics Indoor Tour
First place	2020	High jump
European Championships
Gold medal – first place	2022 Munich	High jump
Gold medal – first place	2024 Rome	High jump
Gold medal – first place	2026 Birmingham	High jump
European Games
Gold medal – first place	2023 Chorzów	High jump
European Indoor Championships
Gold medal – first place	2021 Toruń	High jump
Gold medal – first place	2023 Istanbul	High jump
Gold medal – first place	2025 Apeldoorn	High jump
European U23 Championships
Gold medal – first place	2021 Tallinn	High jump
European U20 Championships
Gold medal – first place	2019 Borås	High jump
Youth Olympics
Gold medal – first place	2018 Buenos Aires	High jump
World U18 Championships
Gold medal – first place	2017 Nairobi	High jump
European Youth Olympic Festival
Gold medal – first place	2017 Győr	High jump
European U18 Championships
Gold medal – first place	2018 Győr	High jump
Event	1st	2nd	3rd
Diamond League Series	23	8	3
World Indoor Tour Meetings	5	0	0
Total	28	8	3

Yaroslava Oleksiivna Mahuchikh (Ukrainian: Ярослава Олексіївна Магучіх, pronounced [jaroˈslɑwɐ mɐˈɦutʃix]; born 19 September 2001) is a Ukrainian high jumper and women's high jump world record holder. She is the winner of four senior global titles: 2026 World Ultimate Championship, 2022 and 2026 World Indoor Championships, 2023 World Championships and 2024 Summer Olympics. Mahuchikh is a three-time Diamond League title holder.

At the 2024 Paris Diamond League, she broke the world record in the event with a jump of 2.10 m.

== Early life ==
Mahuchikh was born on 19 September 2001 in Dnipropetrovsk (now Dnipro) to Olha and Oleksiy Mahuchikh. Her father Oleksiy was a canoeist and mother Olha was a gymnast and did athletics. Her older sister Anastasia Hryhorovich was into karate and athletics and represented Ukraine in karate competitively.

Mahuchikh began doing sports at the age of seven following her sister's lead. Karate became young Mahuchikh's first sport when she accompanied her sister to her karate classes. But Mahuchikh didn't like karate and gave up after a few tries. To help channel the tireless energy of young Mahuchikh to good use, her sister brought her to the local sports club, where she trained, to try athletics next. Young Mahuchikh began to train under her sister's coach Olena Kutsenko where what started off as play classes gradually turned into full-fledged training. Prior to focusing on high jump, Mahuchikh started out competing as a sprinter, hurdler and long jumper, until her current coach Tetiana Stepanova came to the sports club in Dnipro when Mahuchikh was 11. At first, Kutsenko and Stepanova coached Mahuchikh together, but later at the age of 13, Mahuchikh came under the tutelage of Tetiana Stepanova after the coaches parted ways. Under Stepanova's guidance, Mahuchikh deepened her love for sports and found her niche in high jump progressing rapidly in the next few years.

Aside from athletics, Mahuchikh attended singing and art lessons when she was little. She grew to like drawing and painting and participated in art contests until about 2015–2016. She dreamed of becoming an artist or singer but that changed after she started with track and field. She went on later to enrol in Dnipro Higher School of Physical Education to pursue her new aspiration to become a coach.

== Career ==
=== 2016–2018: Youth and junior career ===
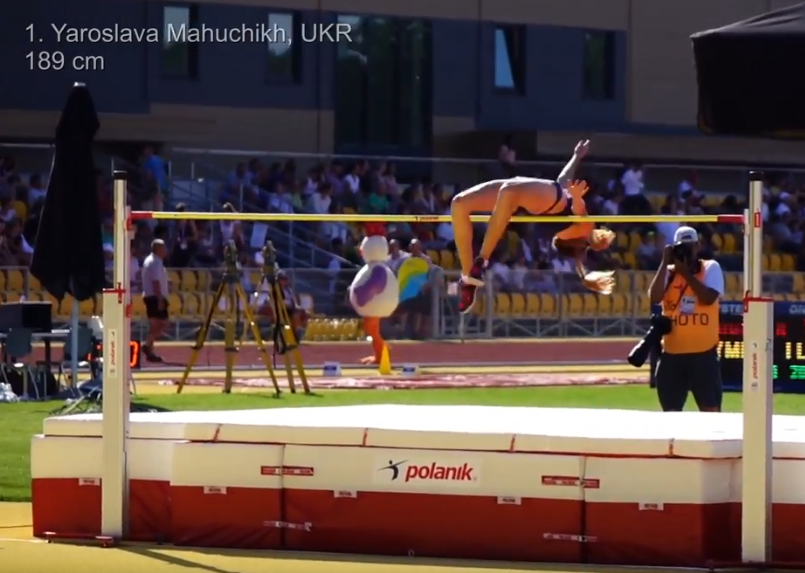
Mahuchikh at the 2017 European Youth Olympics

In 2016, she won the gold medal at the Ukrainian National Juniors Athletics Championships, held in Zaporizhzhia. In that year, Mahuchikh competed at international youth track and field competition between Ukrainian, Belarusian and Turkish national athletics teams in Lutsk, winning a silver medal.

At the age of 15, Mahuchikh competed at her first international meeting in Minsk, jumping 1.82 m. In May 2017, she won a first gold medal in her youth career at international youth track and field competition between Ukrainian, Belarusian and Turkish national athletics teams in Bursa with a clearance of 1.88 m. In July 2017, she won the gold medal at the 2017 IAAF World U18 Championships in Nairobi by the largest margin in World U18 Championships history with a personal best and world age best of 1.92 m. She equalled the championship record of her compatriot Iryna Kovalenko from 2003. A few weeks later, she won the high jump event at the European Youth Olympic Festival in Győr with a clearance of 1.89 m.

In May 2018, Mahuchikh competed at the international meeting Internationales Pfingstsportfest, winning a bronze medal with a jump of 1.86 m. In July 2018, Mahuchikh added 2 cm to her PB clearing 1.94 m at the European U18 Championships and won the gold medal by 10 cm over the runner-up, setting a new championship record. At the end of that month, Mahuchikh won a silver medal at the international track and field meeting in Schifflange, jumping 1.93 m. In October, she won the gold medal at the Youth Olympic Games in Buenos Aires with a combined height of 3.87 m and set a new personal best of 1.95 m at stage 2. A month after her Youth Olympic success, Mahuchikh improved her personal best to 1.96 m and equaled the world U18 best in an annual indoor meeting in Minsk.

=== 2019–2020: First medal (silver) at the World Championships, Rising Star status and new world junior record (indoor and outdoor) ===
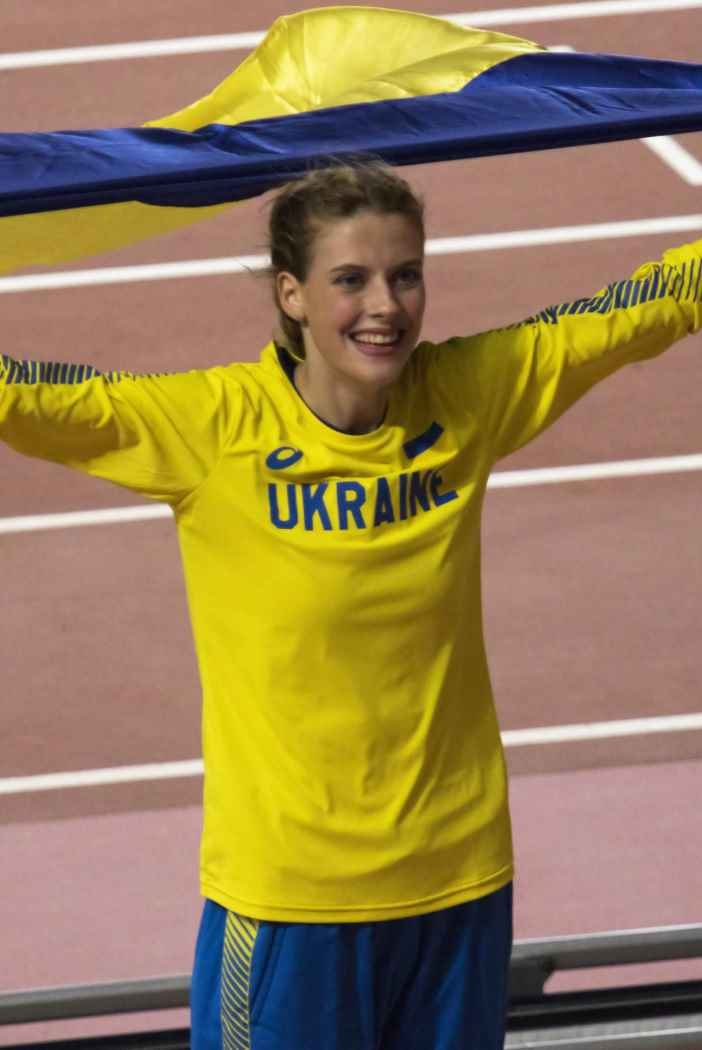
Mahuchikh at the 2019 World Athletics Championships

During the 2019 indoor season, Mahuchikh jumped 1.99 m at the Miloslava Hübnerová Memorial in Hustopeče and equaled Vashti Cunningham's world U20 indoor record.

At the start of outdoor season in May 2019, she won the opening meeting of the Diamond League in Doha with an outdoor personal best of 1.96 m and became the youngest athlete ever to win a Diamond League event at the age of 17 years and 226 days.

On 30 June, at the Prefontaine Classic in Palo Alto, 7th leg of the 2019 Diamond League series, Mahuchikh cleared 2.0 m for the first time, becoming the youngest jumper in history to do so. She finished 3rd at that diamond league event.

In September, she jumped 1.89 m at the Diamond League Final in Brussels, finishing in sixth place. Later that month, she jumped 2.04 m at the World Championships in Doha, winning the silver medal and breaking the world U20 record of 2.01 m held jointly by USSR's Olga Turchak and East Germany's Heike Balck since 1986 and 1989 respectively to become the youngest ever field event medallist in World Championships history at the age of 18 years and 11 days, displacing Heike Drechsler who won the long jump title in 1983 at 18 years and 241 days.

In 2019, Mahuchikh became a member of the Central Sports Club of the Armed Forces of Ukraine. She was voted the European Athletics Female Rising Star and World Athletics Female Rising Star that year.

In January 2020, Mahuchikh jumped 2.01 m in Lviv, a new world U20 indoor record, which she broke again a few days later when she jumped over 2.02 m in Karlsruhe. On 5 March, World Athletics officially ratified her world indoor U20 record. She was the overall winner of the World Indoor Tour in February, thereby securing a wildcard for participating in World Indoor Championships in Nanjing, later postponed due to COVID-19 pandemic regulations in China.

In August, Mahuchikh won the 2020 Herculis in Monaco, the first leg of the delayed 2020 Diamond League series, which had to revise their schedule and format due to the COVID-19 pandemic. Five days later, she won the silver medal at the Irena Szewinska Memorial in Bydgoszcz, jumping 1.97 m. On 23 August, Mahuchikh won the second Diamond League stage BAUHAUS-galan in Stockholm equalling the outdoor world-leading mark of 2.00 m set by her compatriot Yuliya Levchenko in July 2020 when she opened her outdoor season in Kyiv.

In September, Mahuchikh took the silver medal at the World Athletics Continental Tour Bronze meeting, in Dessau, jumping 1.96 m. She was beaten by compatriot Yuliya Levchenko on countback, but both women bettered the previous meeting record of 1.92m set nine years ago by Levern Spencer.

Mahuchikh finished her 2020 outdoor season, with a second-place finish at the Diamond League stage Golden Gala in Rome with a jump of 1.95 m. Incidentally, it was compatriot Yuliya Levchenko who triumphed over her again at the Rome meeting in what was their fifth and final encounter of the outdoor season, giving Levchenko the bragging rights as she ended her season with a 3 to 2 head to head victory over her rising star compatriot.

=== 2021: First Olympic medal (bronze) and first European indoor title ===
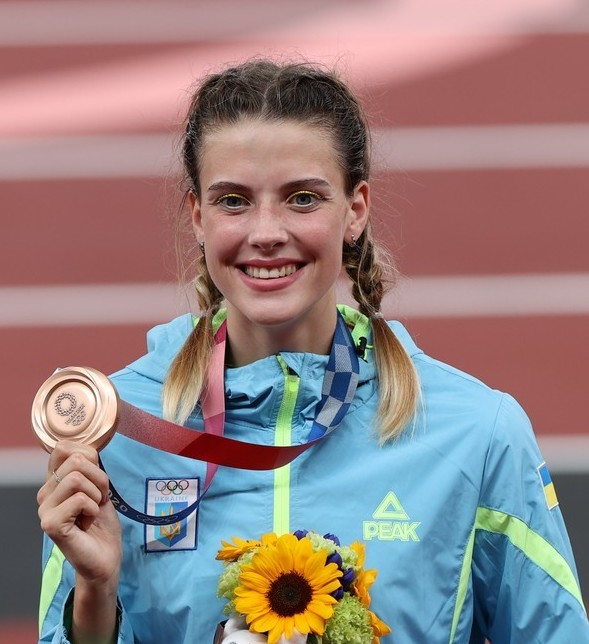
Mahuchikh at the 2020 Summer Olympics

In January, Mahuchikh debuted her indoor season competing at the Christmas Starts in Kyiv, where she jumped 2.02 m matching her Ukrainian indoor record which she set in Karlsruhe last January. Later that month, Mahuchikh won a gold medal at the International High Jump Meeting Udinjump, held in Udine, Italy, jumping 2.00 m, but with three failures at 2.03 m.

In February, Mahuchikh cleared 2.06 m at Banskobystrická latka high jump meeting in Banská Bystrica, the highest any woman had jumped indoors since 2012 and a Ukrainian national record. That mark moved Mahuchikh to equal third on the world indoor all-time list. On 12 February, Mahuchikh won the gold medal at the Ukrainian Athletics Indoor Championships, jumping 2.00 m.

In March, she finished her indoor season receiving the gold medal at the European Indoor Championships in Toruń.

In June, Mahuchikh won the gold medal at the Ukrainian Athletics Championships in Lutsk with a jump of 2.00 m.

In July, Mahuchikh won the Diamond League stage BAUHAUS-galan in Stockholm with an outdoor world-leading mark of 2.03 m. On 10 July, she won the gold medal at the European U23 Championships in Tallinn, clearing a championship record of 2.00 m.

In August, Mahuchikh won the bronze medal in the high jump at the 2020 Summer Olympics in Tokyo. It was the third Olympic medal won by Ukraine in the women's high jump event after Inha Babakova and Vita Styopina, who both clinched bronze medals too at the 1996 and 2004 Summer Olympics respectively.

In September, Mahuchikh finished first at the Diamond League stage 2021 Memorial Van Damme in Brussels, jumping 2.02 m. Later that month, she came in second at the Diamond League Final in Zurich with a jump of 2.03 m.

=== 2022: First World Indoor title, first European title and first Diamond League title ===
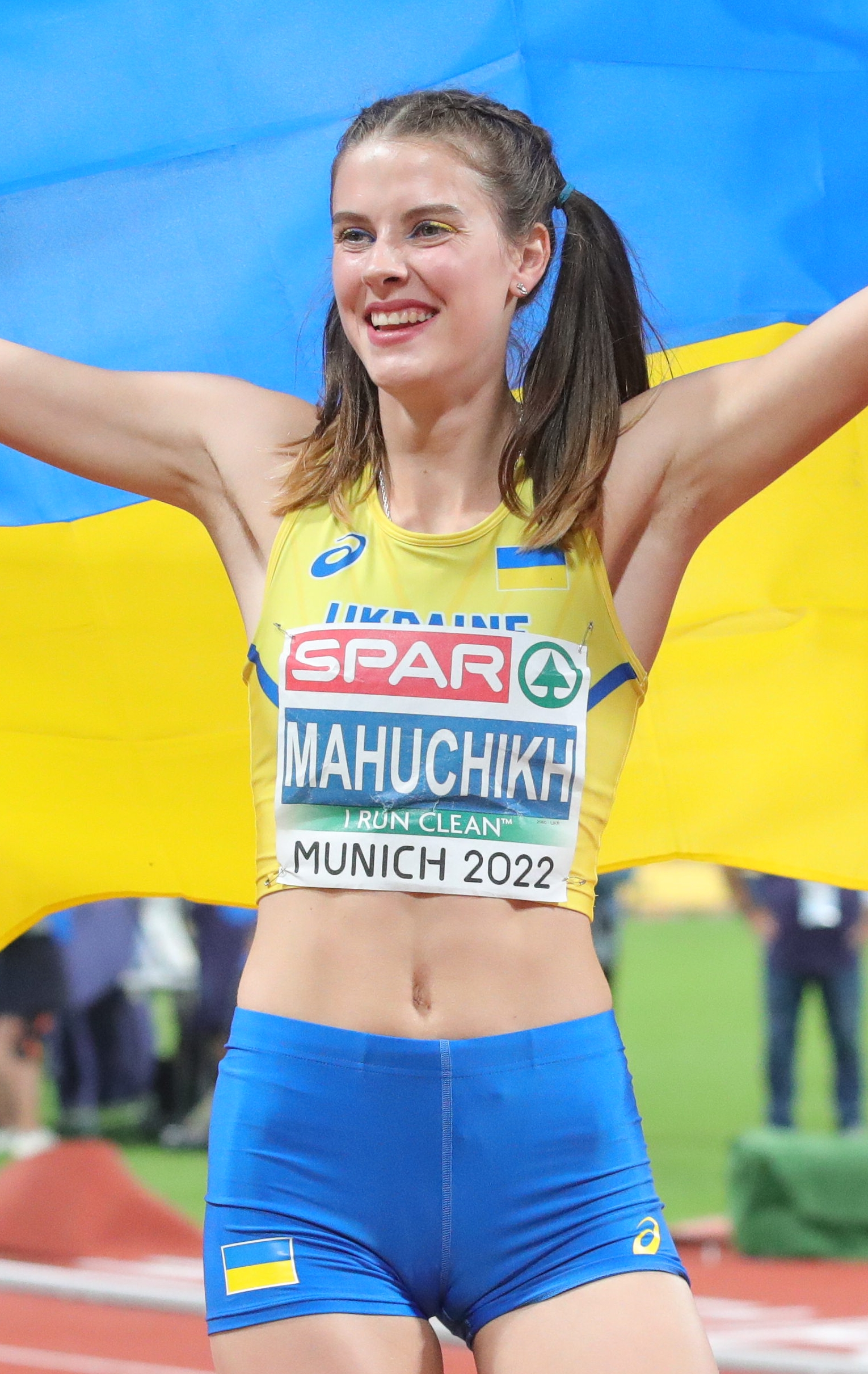
Mahuchikh at the 2022 European Athletics Championships

In February, 9 days before the Russian invasion of Ukraine, Mahuchikh cleared a European-leading jump of 1.99 m at the Banská Bystrica high jump meeting in Slovakia.

In March, days after fleeing the Russian invasion, Mahuchikh claimed the gold medal in the high jump at the World Indoor Championships in Belgrade. She had to undertake a three-day journey of 2000 km by car from Ukraine to Serbia to compete at the championships. Afterwards, she moved to Germany to train while the war continued in her country.

In April, Mahuchikh won the Diamond League stage Prefontaine Classic in Eugene, jumping a world-leading mark of 2.00 m, to claim her first circuit victory since the start of Russian invasion of her country. In June, she improved her world lead to 2.01 m at the Diamond League stage 2022 Meeting de Paris.

In July, Mahuchikh won the silver medal at the World Championships in Eugene, Oregon, and in August, she took gold medal at the European Championships in Munich, becoming the first Ukrainian to earn the European title in high jump.

In September, she won the high jump at the Brussels Diamond League meeting with a world-leading mark of 2.05 m, which was also a Ukrainian national record. Later that month, she won the Diamond League Final in Zurich with a jump of 2.03 m, 9 cm ahead of her nearest competitor to claim her first Diamond League title. Mahuchikh won five of the seven Diamond League high jump events in 2022.

In October, World Athletics announced that Mahuchikh together with fellow Ukrainian high jumper Andriy Protsenko were shortlisted as one of the three finalists for the International Fair Play Committee's (CIFP) Fair Play Award 2022. Both athletes were nominated for displaying "incredible strength and resilience" to win silver and bronze medals respectively at the Oregon 2022 World Championships, despite facing huge challenges due to the current situation in Ukraine. The fair play award eventually went to Katie Nageotte and Holly Bradshaw. For her sporting achievements in 2022, Mahuchikh was a finalist in her first nomination for the European Female Athlete of the Year award competition. She was also nominated for the Women's World Athlete of the Year award by World Athletics, for the first time too.

In November, Mahuchikh was nominated for the 2022 International Female Athlete of the Year by Athletics Weekly (Readers' Choice Awards) and also for the World Women's Athlete of the Year by Track and Field News.

=== 2023: First world title, second European indoor title and second Diamond League title ===
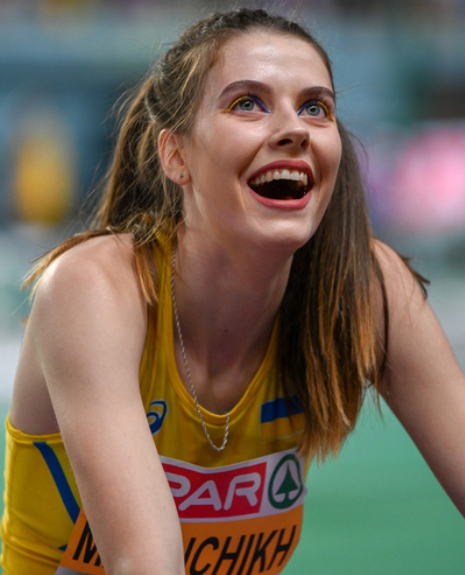
Mahuchikh at the 2023 European Athletics Indoor Championships

In January 2023, Mahuchikh cleared a world-leading jump of 2.00 m at the Demyanyuk Memorial in Lviv. The following month, she improved her world-leading result, jumping 2.02 m at Metz Moselle Athelor meeting in Metz. In March, Mahuchikh finished her indoor season, winning the gold medal at the European Indoor Championships.

In June, she won the gold medal at the European Games. It was the third gold medal for the Ukrainian athletics team during this European Games.

In August, Mahuchikh won the gold medal at the World Championships in Budapest becoming the first Ukrainian to win a world title in 10 years since 2013 when high jumper Bohdan Bondarenko and heptathlon athlete Hanna Melnychenko last won gold medals at the 2013 World Championships in Moscow. It was also the second gold medal in women's high jump at the World Championships after Inha Babakova in 1999. Three days later after Mahuchikh's win at the World Championships, Estonia handed over a lifesaving demining robot "Yaroslava", named after her, to the Ukrainian Armed Forces.

On 2 September, Mahuchikh jumped a season-best mark of 2.02 m at the Diamond League stage in Xiamen. Later in the month, she defended her diamond league title at the Diamond League Final in Eugene, Oregon with a world-leading mark of 2.03 m, becoming the first Ukrainian in history to win two Diamond League trophies.

Later in the year, Mahuchikh was a finalist in the 2023 Women's European Athlete of the Year award competition for a second consecutive year. She was also nominated by World Athletics for the 2023 Women's World Athlete of the Year award, also for a second time in her career. For the second time in her career, Mahuchikh was also a nominee for the 2023 International Female Athlete of the Year award by Athletics Weekly (Readers' Choice Awards) and for the 2023 World Women's Athlete of the Year award by Track and Field News. Mahuchikh was in the list of PAP European Sportsperson of the Year Award nominees, taking 22nd place in poll.

=== 2024: World record, Olympic gold medal, grand slam at 22 & third Diamond League title ===
In January, Mahuchikh kicked off her 2024 campaign at the Internationales Springer-Meeting in Cottbus in superb form clearing a world-leading jump of 2.04 m, both a meeting record and the highest she ever started in a competitive year. In February, she debuted at the Millrose Games, where she won the gold medal with a jump of 2.00 m. In March, Mahuchikh finished her indoor season, winning the silver medal at the 2024 World Indoor Championships held in Glasgow.

In June, she debuted her outdoor season, winning 2024 Diamond League stage BAUHAUS-galan in Stockholm, jumping 2.00 metres. Later, she won the gold medal at the European Championships in Rome, Italy, becoming European champion for a second time in a row. She equalled Iolanda Balaș's record of two European Championships titles with her achievement.

In July, she broke the world record in high jump by jumping 2.10 m at the Wanda Diamond League in Paris. The previous record (2.09 m) was one of the longest-standing on the books, set by Stefka Kostadinova at the 1987 World Championships. On 24 October 2024, World Athletics officially ratified her world record. On 8 July, a day after Mahuchikh set the new world record, Russia launched a massive missile attack on Ukraine killing at least 37 people and injuring about 170 others including 2 adults who died when Okhmatdyt children's hospital was hit. Mahuchikh reacted to the missile attack on Instagram saying "No record will bring joy while Russia attacks my country every day, kills our soldiers, and takes the lives of children and their parents".

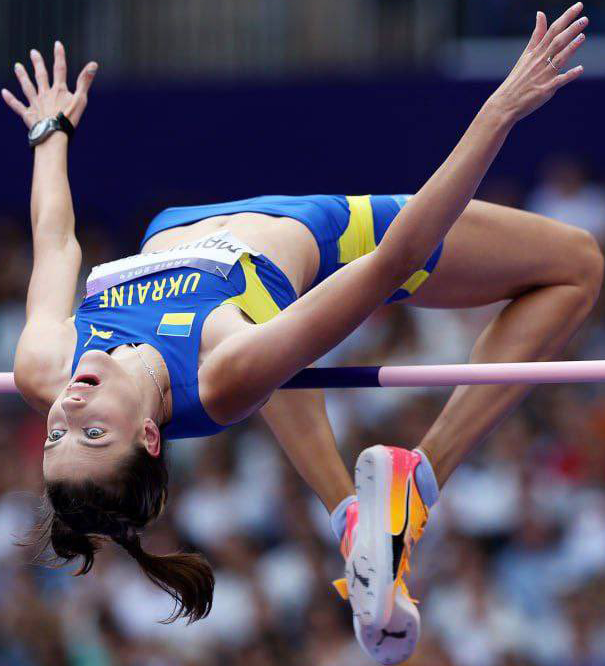
Mahuchikh clearing the bar at the 2024 Summer Olympics

In August, Mahuchikh won the gold medal at the Summer Olympics in Paris, jumping 2.00 m to become a new Olympic champion. It was Ukraine's first individual gold of the Summer Games, following a victory in the women's team sabre fencing. Mahuchikh became the third Ukrainian Olympic champion in athletics after Inessa Kravets in the triple jump in 1996 and Nataliya Dobrynska in the pentathlon in 2008. Mahuchikh also became the first Ukrainian sportswoman to win the Youth Olympic Games and Olympic Games and to win two Olympic medals in athletics. After the final of the high jump event, Time, The New York Times and other media outlets wrote about her routine of resting in a sleeping bag during jump breaks, which aided her in winning gold medal at this Summer Olympics, and all of a sudden she became a hero of memes. After the victory at the 2024 Olympics, a song was created about Yaroslava Mahuchikh.

On 22 August, Mahuchikh marked her debut as Olympic champion winning the Diamond League stage Athletissima in Lausanne by jumping 1.99 m. With this victory, her third Diamond League win of the season having previous triumphed in Stockholm and Paris, she qualified early for the Diamond League Finals at Brussels before the last leg of the Diamond League high jump series at Zurich.

In September, Mahuchikh won the Diamond League stage Weltklasse Zürich amid rainy conditions with a clearance of 1.96 m, her lowest winning height in a year and a half at international competitions. On 13 September, Mahuchikh won the Diamond League Final in Brussels by jumping 1.97 m and winning her third Diamond League title of her career.

In October, Mahuchikh opined in an interview that Swedish pole vaulter Armand Duplantis is the best male athlete of the world because of his record breaking achievements. A few days later, both Duplantis and Mahuchikh were crowned the male and female European Athlete of the Year respectively. For Mahuchikh, this was her first time and she became too the first Ukrainian sportswoman to win the award and just the second Ukrainian to be crown after high jumper Bohdan Bondarenko won the men's award in 2013.

In November, Mahuchikh was crowned the Balkan Female Athlete of the Year by Association of the Balkan Athletics Federations, where Ukrainian Athletic Federation is a member since 2016. On 23 November, International Sports Press Association nominated Mahuchikh for Best Female Athlete of 2024.

On 1 December, Mahuchikh was crowned the World Female Field Athlete of the Year. She was the first Ukrainian to win this award. On 12 December, Mahuchikh's Paris Olympic kit (her Ukraine singlet, name bib and shorts) which she wore when winning the high jump event at the 2024 Summer Olympics, was inducted into World Athletics Heritage collection along with donated artefacts from other past and present athletes. The athletes' artefacts are now on display in the online 3D galleries of the Museum of World Athletics (MOWA).

By adding an Olympic gold to her collection in Paris on 4 August, Mahuchikh completed a 'grand slam' of major championship titles: Olympic, world outdoor and indoor plus European outdoor and indoor, at 22, becoming the youngest grand slamming high jump golden girl in the annals of track and field – by a considerable margin of six years. Two others had accomplished the feat before Mahuchikh: Stefka Kostadinova, the Bulgarian high jumper was 31 by the time she managed to complete her set with Olympic success in Atlanta in 1996 while Russian high jumper Mariya Lasitskene was 28 when she added the missing chunk of Olympic gold in Tokyo in 2021. Mahuchikh further cemented her place in posterity when she also became the first woman in her event for 48 years to achieve the double of winning Olympic gold and setting a world record in the same season. Before that, the feat was achieved by East Germany's Rosi Ackermann in 1976.

Her Olympic kit was included into the Museum of World Athletics (MOWA) collection. It has been donated to World Athletics Heritage Collection.

On 23 December, Mahuchikh's world record jump in Paris clinched the Diamond League's Jump Moment of the Year. Her world record moment in Paris was voted Field Champion for the 2024 Moment of the Year too.

=== 2025: Third European indoor title in her first season as Olympic champion ===
In February, she debuted her indoor season, finishing first at the International High Jump Meeting Udinjump, held in Udine, Italy, her second gold medal at the Italy tournament since 2021, jumping 1.94 m, but with three failures at 1.98 m. On 18 February, she won the high jump meeting Banskobystrická latka in Slovakia, clearing a world-leading jump of 2.01 m, becoming the first athlete of the season to clear the 2.00m mark.

On 9 March, Mahuchikh won a gold medal at the European Indoor Championships in Apeldoorn with a jump of 1.99 meters, becoming a three-time European indoor champion. She equaled Rosemarie Ackermann's and Rita Schmidt's record of three European indoor titles with her achievement.

On 23 March, Mahuchikh finished her indoor season, winning a bronze medal at the World Indoor Championships in Nanjing with a clearance of 1.95 meters. It also ended her 10 consecutive winning streaks at international competitions. The last time she did not win "gold" was at the 2024 World Athletics Indoor Championships in Glasgow where she claimed a silver. She revealed later she picked up an injury on her ankle after winning her third European indoor title in Apeldoom earlier in March. Mahuchikh was the only Ukrainian athlete to win a medal in Nanjing.

On 26 April, Yaroslava debuted her outdoor season with a win at the Xiamen Diamond League with a clearance of 1.97 m. It was her 20th victory at the Diamond League stages in her career.

On 9 May, Mahuchikh won the What Gravity Challenge in Doha with a world-leading jump of 2.02 m.

On 15 June, Mahuchikh finished second at the 2025 Diamond League stage BAUHAUS-galan with a jump of 1.99 m, losing to Nicola Olyslagers who claimed victory with a winning mark of 2.01 m. This defeat was Mahuchikh's first outdoor loss since July 2023, when she placed third at the Diamond League stage in Monaco. Prior to that, she had won ten consecutive Diamond League stages. Later, she won the high jump competition at the 1st division of European Team Championships in Madrid with a clearance of 2.00 metres.

On 19 July, Yaroslava faced a setback at the Diamond League stage in London, where for the first time in three years she failed to reach the podium, finishing in fourth place.

In August, she competed at the Diamond League stage Kamila Skolimowska Memorial in Silesia with a meeting record of 2.00 metres.

She won the gold medal at high jump at the 2026 European Championship in Birmingham.

== Controversy with Lasitskene ==
After the final event at the 2020 Summer Olympics, Mahuchikh congratulated Russian high jumper and Olympic champion Mariya Lasitskene for her win and hugged her. Her gesture of sportsmanship however evoked a wave of nationalistic feelings against her among Ukrainians and caused a controversy because of the ongoing Russo-Ukrainian War and the fact that both athletes were honorary members of their respective country's armed forces. Lasitskene held the rank of captain in the Russian Armed Forces while Mahuchikh was a junior lieutenant in the Armed Forces of Ukraine: their military ranks were awarded to them because of their outstanding athletic achievements. Ukrainian karateka Stanislav Horuna, who won bronze in the men's under 75 kg kumite karate category, took to Facebook to express his support for Mahuchikh. Mahuchikh herself explained that the photo with Lasitskene had no political intent.

In September 2021, after the Diamond League Final at Zurich, there was a new controversy because of another photo with Lasitskene, who won the Diamond League Final. The photo was a wefie taken by Australian high jumper Eleanor Patterson and posted on her Instagram page.

After the beginning of the Russian invasion of Ukraine, Mahuchikh said that she regretted the photo with Lasitskene during the 2020 Summer Olympics and that Lasitskene was not her idol anymore.

== Contributions to Ukraine's war effort ==
=== Opposition to Russian athletes competing internationally ===
On 1 March 2022, in the wake of Russian invasion of Ukraine, World Athletics banned Russian and Belarusian athletes from all international track and field competitions for the foreseeable future. At the 2022 World Athletics Indoor Championships in mid-March 2022, Mahuchikh condemned the Russian invasion of Ukraine. In July 2022, during the 2022 World Athletics Championships in Eugene, Oregon, Mahuchikh voiced support when World Athletics reaffirmed its decision to exclude Russian athletes from Oregon22.

The International Olympic Committee had earlier recommended international federations to exclude Russia and Belarus from hosting and competing in the wake of the Russian invasion. In June 2023, at the Lausanne diamond league, after the IOC made a partial change of decision in March 2023 recommending international federations to allow the gradual return of neutral Russian athletes – those evaluated to have no military links – back to international competitions, Mahuchikh publicly criticized president of the IOC Thomas Bach arguing defending Russian athletes citing discrimination is unacceptable when Ukraine's situation remained unchanged and many of her country's athletes were still deprived of a safe and proper training facility. She insisted Russians should be excluded from 2024 Paris Olympics. But IOC's decision in March 2023 held off on deciding whether Russian and Belarusian athletes could compete at next year's Summer Olympics until an appropriate time.

In February 2024, after IOC announced in December 2023 that athletes from Russia and Belarus will be allowed to take part as individual neutral athletes in 2024 Paris Olympics, so long as they meet certain eligibility criteria, Mahuchikh expressed disappointment saying that it would be difficult for her to compete against athletes from those countries as they would remind her of the destruction of the cities and lives in Ukraine brought about by Russian people. However, IOC's announcement did not change World Athletic's stance. For the sport of track and field, athletes from Russia and Belarus continued to be excluded from the Paris Summer Games according to its governing body.

In June 2024, during the European Championships, Mahuchikh shared that she has spoken to international media to no avail against non-neutral former Russian athletes competing internationally under the citizenship of another country in some sports such as Elena Kulichenko, an ex-Russian high jumper who competed for Cyprus internationally since 2023 after obtaining Cypriot citizenship in 2019. The Cypriot high jumper was chosen as one of the flagbearer for Cyprus at the upcoming 2024 Summer Olympics and slated to meet Mahuchikh in the high jump event at the Summer Games.

=== Assisting Ukraine's war needs ===
In November 2023, Mahuchikh supported the Ukrainian art project "Stolen art", established by United24 and the Oliz brand to draw attention to the destruction of Ukrainian culture.

In August 2024, after her win at the 2024 Summer Olympics, Mahuchikh transferred a portion of her prize money to animal rights groups and military needs in her country. She donated 1 million hryvnas to animal rescue organization UAnimals and four shelters: Sumy Society for the Protection of Animals, "Pegas" in Dnipro, "Homeless World" and "Dnipro Animals Foundation". She also donated 500 thousand hryvnas to the military's Azov's Angels Patronage Service and another 500 thousand hryvnas to the Hospitallers to fund the treatment and recovery of wounded soldiers with head injuries. Later, Ukrainian influencer and blogger Ihor Lachenkov in Telegram announced Mahuchikh's donation of 1 million hryvnas to provide vehicles for combat units of the Ukrainian Armed Forces on the front line.

In October 2024, Mahuchikh told Tribuna, a Ukrainian sports publishing house, in an interview that she donated her 2024 Paris Olympics competition bib to the "Heroes Cup" charity auction where it was sold for 300,000 hryvnas (UAH) to help with military rebuilding effort. In the same month, Mahuchikh took part in the 18th Council of Europe Conference of Ministers responsible for Sport, held in Porto, where she made a speech about the Ukrainian sport during the Russian invasion of Ukraine. Later that month, Mahuchikh became an ambassador of the Ukrainian National project "Vriatui Kintsivku" (Save Limb), dedicated to the rehabilitation of Ukrainian Armed Forces troops.

In November 2024, Mahuchikh told to a television host and media personality Masha Efrosynina in an interview that she privately donated to troops of the Ukrainian Armed Forces since the beginning of the Russian invasion in 2022.

== International competitions ==
Representing Ukraine
Year	Competition	Venue	Position	Result	Notes
2017	World U18 Championships	Nairobi, Kenya	1st	1.92 m	CR
2017	European Youth Olympics	Győr, Hungary	1st	1.89 m	
2018	European U18 Championships	Győr, Hungary	1st	1.94 m	CR
2018	Youth Olympic Games	Buenos Aires, Argentina	1st	1.92 m + 1.95 m (Note: This event took place in two stages, and these results were added for the final placing.)	
2019	European U20 Championships	Borås, Sweden	1st	1.92 m	
2019	Diamond League Final	Brussels, Belgium	6th	1.89 m	
2019	World Championships	Doha, Qatar	2nd	2.04 m	WJR
2021	European Indoor Championships	Toruń, Poland	1st	2.00 m	
2021	European U23 Championships	Tallinn, Estonia	1st	2.00 m	CR
2021	Olympic Games	Tokyo, Japan	3rd	2.00 m	
2021	Diamond League Final	Zurich, Switzerland	2nd	2.03 m	
2022	World Indoor Championships	Belgrade, Serbia	1st	2.02 m	
2022	World Championships	Eugene, United States	2nd	2.02 m	
2022	European Championships	Munich, Germany	1st	1.95 m	
2022	Diamond League Final	Zurich, Switzerland	1st	2.03 m	
2023	European Indoor Championships	Istanbul, Turkey	1st	1.98 m	
2023	European Games	Chorzów, Poland	1st	1.97 m	
2023	World Championships	Budapest, Hungary	1st	2.01 m	
2023	Diamond League Final	Eugene, United States	1st	2.03 m	
2024	World Indoor Championships	Glasgow, United Kingdom	2nd	1.97 m	
2024	European Championships	Rome, Italy	1st	2.01 m	
2024	Olympic Games	Paris, France	1st	2.00 m	
2024	Diamond League Final	Brussels, Belgium	1st	1.97 m	
2025	European Indoor Championships	Apeldoorn, Netherlands	1st	1.99 m	
2025	World Indoor Championships	Nanjing, China	3rd	1.95 m	
2025	European Team Championships	Madrid, Spain	1st	2.00 m	
2025	Diamond League Final	Zurich, Switzerland	2nd	2.02 m	
2025	World Championships	Tokyo, Japan	3rd	1.97 m	
2026	World Indoor Championships	Toruń, Poland	1st	2.01 m	
2026	European Championships	Birmingham, United Kingdom	1st	1.97 m	
2026	Untimate Championship	Budapest, Hungary	1st	1.99 m	

== National championships ==
Year	Competition	Location	Position	Results	Notes
2016	Ukrainian U18 Championships	Zaporizhzhia	1st	1.75 m	
2017	Ukrainian U18 Indoor Championships	Zaporizhzhia	1st	1.83 m	
2017	Ukrainian U20 Indoor Championships	Sumy	1st	1.84 m	
2017	Ukrainian U18 Championships	Kropyvnytskyi	1st	1.80 m	
2018	Ukrainian U18 Indoor Championships	Sumy	1st	1.80 m	
2019	Ukrainian Championships	Lutsk	2nd	1.96 m	
2020	Ukrainian Indoor Championships	Sumy	1st	2.01 m	
2021	Ukrainian Indoor Championships	Sumy	1st	2.00 m	
2021	Ukrainian Championships	Lutsk	1st	2.00 m	

== Personal bests ==
Event	Competition	Best	Venue	Date
High jump (outdoor)	2024 Meeting De Paris	2.10 m (6 ft 10 1/2 in)	Paris, France	7 July 2024
High jump (indoor)	27th Banskobystrická latka	2.06 m (6 ft 9 in)	Banská Bystrica, Slovakia	2 February 2021

== Personal life ==
Mahuchikh dated Nazar Stepanov, a Ukrainian hurdler and their national record holder, who is the son of Mahuchikh's coach Tetiana Stepanova. In November 2023, Mahuchikh said in her interview that she was engaged to Nazar. In October 2024, Mahuchikh told Athletistic in an interview that she had to postpone her wedding with Nazar because they wanted to hold their wedding with relatives and friends, then scattered all over the world, gathered in Ukraine, where it was impossible to do so because of the Russian invasion.

Mahuchikh picked up the hobby of reading when young. She read Harry Potter books by J. K. Rowling to improve her English. Besides fantasy, she read other genres such as science fiction, romance and crime fiction. Besides novels, she liked books that chronicled successful companies such as Netflix and Starbucks as well as biographies of successful people such as Will Smith and Coco Chanel. One of her favourite reads was Pour Your Heart Into It: How Starbucks Built a Company One Cup at a Time by Howard Schultz.

Mahuchikh is also an ambassador of Puma, Omega SA and Red Bull. She modelled occasionally for her brand sponsors and for various fashion and lifestyle magazines such as Elle and Vogue Ukraine. She appeared in New York Fashion Week before.

In October 2024, Mahuchikh starred in advertising famous cafe with patisseries "Honey" in Kyiv.

== Recognition ==
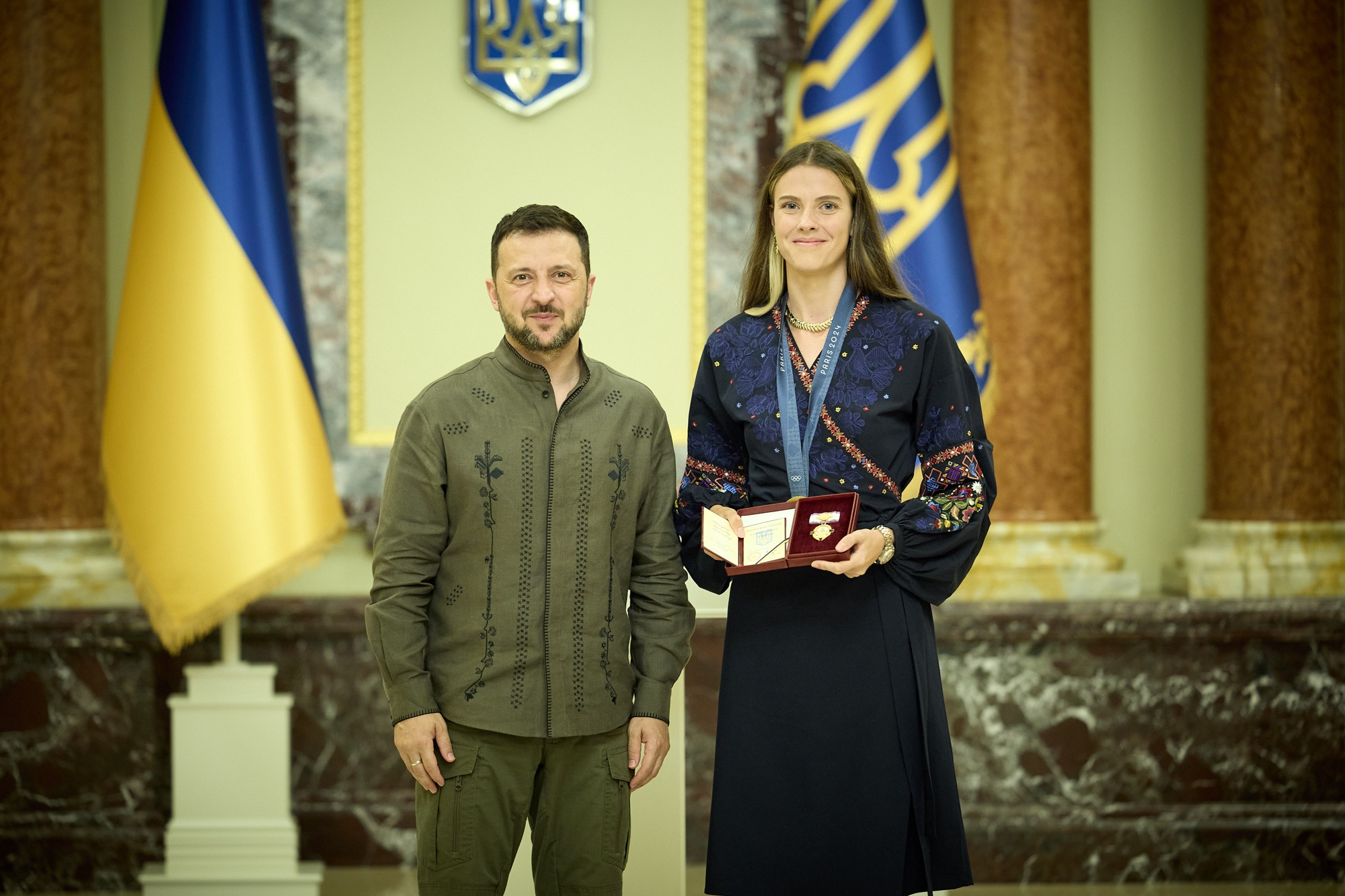
Mahuchikh with the Ukrainian President Volodymyr Zelenskyy in 2024

- World Athletics Awards
  - World Athete of the Year (Women):
    - 2024 (Women's Field) Winner
    - 2023 (Women's Field) Nominee
    - 2022 Nominee
  - Rising Star of the Year (Women): 2019
- European Athletics Awards
  - European Athlete of the Year (Women):
    - 2024 Winner
    - 2023 Finalist
    - 2022 Finalist
  - Rising Star of the Year (Women): 2019
  - European Athlete of the Month
    - March 2022
    - January 2021
- Balkan Athletics Awards
  - Female Athlete of the Year (2024)
  - Female Rising Star of the Year (2019)
- Ukrainian Athletic Federation Awards
  - Best Athlete of the Year (2021)
  - Best Athlete of the Year and Women's Rising Star (2019)
- The EOC Piotr Nurowski Prize for Best European Young Athlete (2019)
- Ukrainian Civil Decoration
  - Member 1st Class of the Order of Princess Olga (2024)
  - Member 2nd Class of the Order of Princess Olga (2023)
  - Member 3rd Class of the Order of Princess Olga (2021)
  - National Legend of Ukraine (2025)
- National Olympic Committee of Ukraine Awards
  - Best Athlete of the Year (2023, 2024) (Note: Award is presented at Ukraine's Heroes of Sports Year annual awards ceremony)
  - "Women in Sports" – The Harmony of Success (2024)
  - The Olympic Hope of Ukraine (2019)
  - Best Athlete of the Month
    - June 2024, August 2024, September 2024
    - August 2023
    - May 2019
- Sports Title conferred by Ministry of Youth and Sports, Government of Ukraine
  - Merited Master of Sports of Ukraine (2019)
- Ukraine Sports Press Association Awards
  - Best Athlete of the Year (2023, 2024)
- "Treasure of the Nation" National Award (2024) by NGO "Guardian of Humanity"
- Other Recognitions
  - Best Athlete of the Year according to Suspilne Sport and Champion (2024)
  - Top 15 of the greatest teenage athletes in the world by Business Insider (2019)
  - Top 10 World Female Athletes by Making of Champions (2022, 2024)
  - Forbes 30 Under 30
    - Europe List – Sports & Games (2024)
    - Ukraine List – Sports (2020)
  - Top 100 most influential Ukrainians according to The New Voice of Ukraine and Focus (2024)
  - Ukrainska Pravda Awards:
    - Top 100 Ukrainian leaders (2024)
    - UP 100. Power of Women project (2025)
  - Person of the Year (2024)
  - International Sports Press Association (AIPS) Best Female Athlete of the Year: 2024 (8th)
  - PAP European Sportsperson of the Year Award
    - Sportperson of the Year: 2023 (22nd), 2024 (8th)
  - L'Équipe Champion of Champions: 2024 (5th)
  - Nominated for Athletics Weekly Readers Choice's International Female Athlete of the Year award in 2022, 2023 & 2024
  - Nominated for Track & Field News' Female Athlete of the Year award in 2022, 2023 & 2024
  - Jupiter trojan asteroid 57915 Mahuchikh, named in 2025

== See also ==
- List of Youth Olympic Games gold medalists who won Olympic gold medals
- Female two metres club
- Women's high jump world record progression

Records
Preceded by (Bulgaria) Stefka Kostadinova	Women's High Jump World Record Holder; 7 July 2024 –	Succeeded by Incumbent
Preceded by (Germany) Heike Balck	Women's High Jump World U20 Record Holder; 30 September 2019 –	Succeeded by Incumbent
