= Christina Honsel =

German high jumper (born 1997)

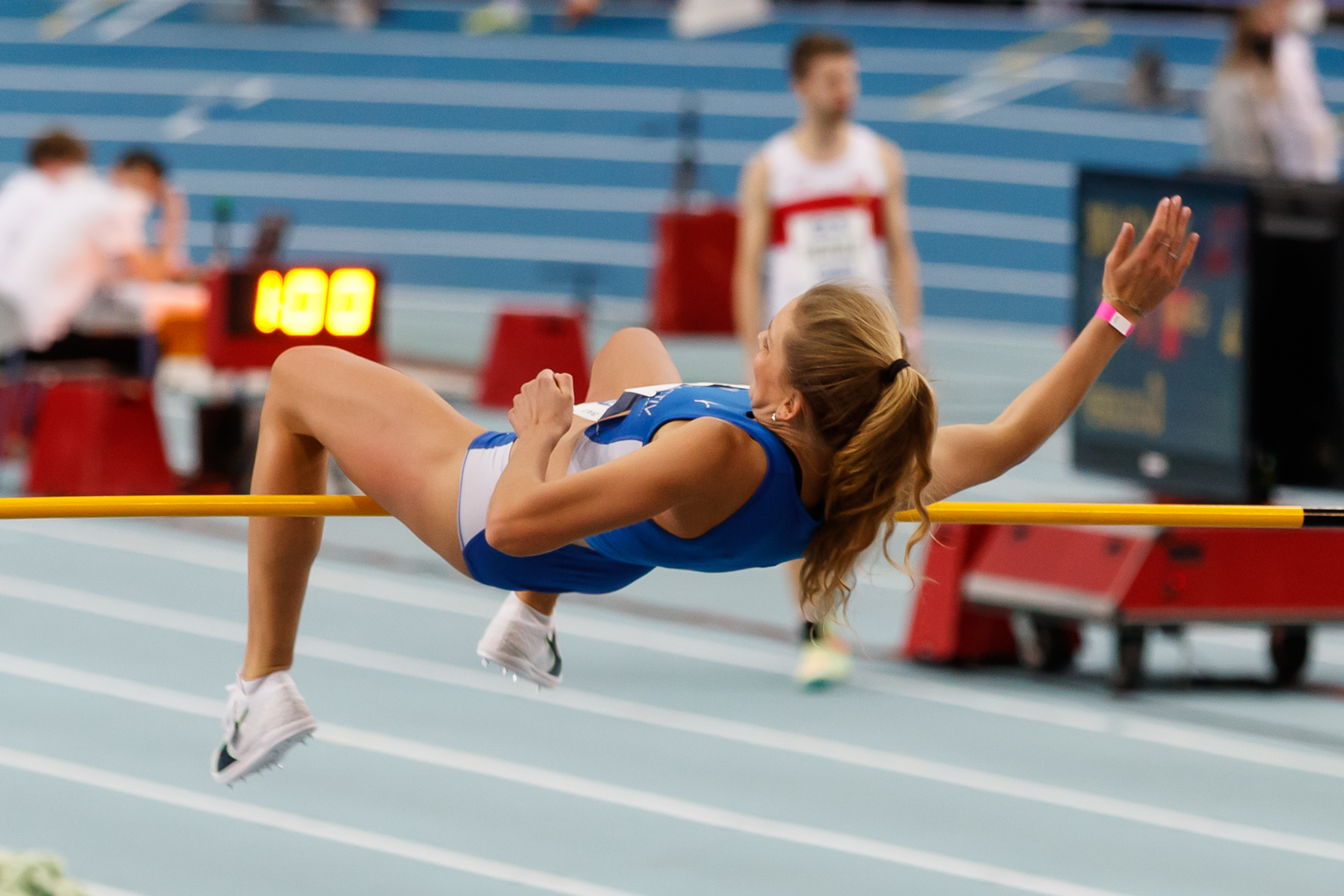
- 2022 in Leipzig

Personal information
- Born: 7 July 1997 (age 29) Dorsten, Germany
- Height: 180 cm (5 ft 11 in)

Sport
- Sport: Athletics
- Event: High jump
- Club: LG Olympia Dortmund
- Coached by: Brigitte Kurschilgen
Medal record
Women's athletics
Representing Germany
European U23 Championships
Silver medal – second place	Gävle 2019	High jump

Christina Honsel (born 7 July 1997) is a German athlete specialising in the high jump. She represented her country at the 2019 World Championships without qualifying for the final. Earlier that year she won a silver medal at the 2019 European U23 Championships.

Her personal bests in the event are 2.00 metres outdoors (Heilbronn 2025) and 1.98 metres indoors (Leipzig 2023).

She placed fourth at high jump at the 2026 European Championship in Birmingham.

== International competitions ==
Year	Competition	Venue	Position	Notes
Representing Germany
2019	European U23 Championships	Gävle, Sweden	2nd	1.92 m
2019	World Championships	Doha, Qatar	27th (q)	1.80 m
2023	European Indoor Championships	Istanbul, Turkey	6th	1.91 m
2023	World Championships	Budapest, Hungary	8th	1.94 m
2024	World Indoor Championships	Glasgow, United Kingdom	4th	1.95 m
2024	European Championships	Rome, Italy	11th	1.86 m
2024	Olympic Games	Paris, France	6th	1.95 m
2025	European Indoor Championships	Apeldoorn, Netherlands	4th	1.92 m
2025	World Championships	Tokyo, Japan	7th	1.93 m
2026	European Championships	Birmingham, United Kingdom	4th	1.92 m
