= Nicola Olyslagers =

Australian high jumper (born 1996)

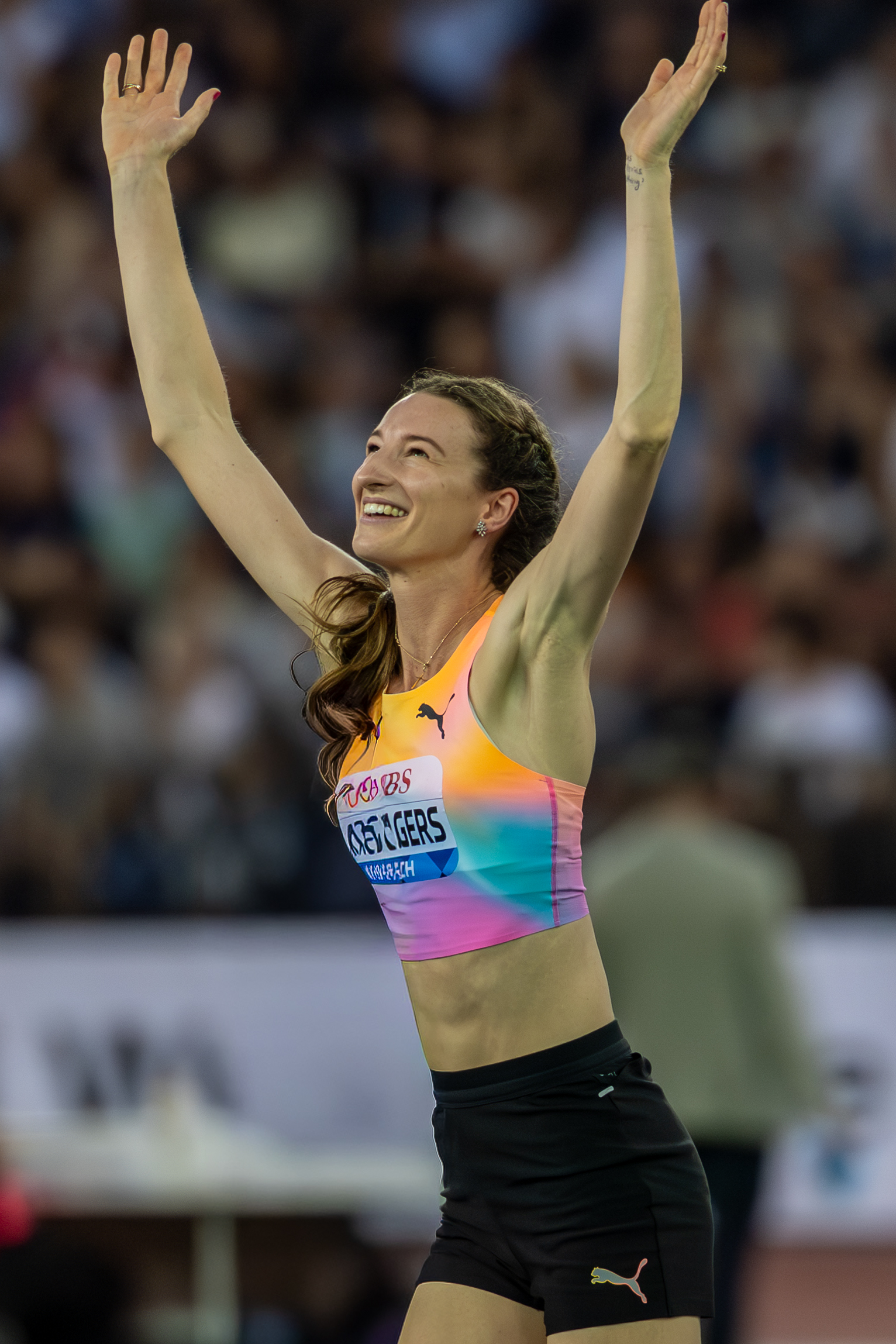
- Nicola Olyslagers wins the High Jump at the Wanda Diamond League’s Weltklasse Zürich athletics competition.

Personal information
- Nationality: Australian
- Born: 28 December 1996 (age 29) North Gosford, New South Wales, Australia
- Education: University of Sydney
- Height: 1.86 m (6 ft 1 in)
- Weight: 63 kg (139 lb)

Sport
- Sport: Athletics
- Event: High jump

Achievements and titles
- Olympic finals: 2020 Tokyo; High jump, Silver; 2024 Paris; High jump, Silver
- World finals: 2023 Budapest; High jump, Bronze; 2025 Tokyo; High jump, Gold
- Personal best: High jump: 2.04 m (6 ft 8 1/4 in) AR (Zurich 2025)
Medal record
Women's athletics
Representing Australia
Olympic Games
Silver medal – second place	2020 Tokyo	High jump
Silver medal – second place	2024 Paris	High jump
World Championships
Gold medal – first place	2025 Tokyo	High jump
Bronze medal – third place	2023 Budapest	High jump
World Ultimate Championship
Second place	2026 Budapest	High jump
World Indoor Championships
Gold medal – first place	2024 Glasgow	High jump
Gold medal – first place	2025 Nanjing	High jump
Silver medal – second place	2026 Toruń	High jump
Diamond League
Second place	2023	High jump
Second place	2024	High jump
First place	2025	High jump
Commonwealth Games
Silver medal – second place	2026 Glasgow	High jump
Bronze medal – third place	2018 Gold Coast	High jump

Nicola Lauren Olyslagers (née McDermott) (born 28 December 1996) is an Australian high jumper. She won the silver medal at the Tokyo 2020 and Paris 2024 Olympics, the bronze medal at the 2023 World Athletics Championships and the gold medal at the 2025 World Athletics Championships in the high jump. Olyslagers is the current high jump Oceanian record holder, 2025 Diamond League title holder and the world champion at the 2024 World Athletics Indoor Championships.

== Career ==
Olyslagers competed in the women's high jump at the 2017 World Championships in Athletics. Olyslagers also competed in the women's high jump at the 2018 Commonwealth Games, where she achieved a personal best jump of 1.91m and won the bronze medal. On 20 June 2019, Olyslagers jumped a personal best of 1.96m at Mestský Stadion, Ostrava, Czech Republic. Achieving a new personal best of 1.98 m in Sinn, Germany, on 29 August 2020, she rose to second place in the all-time list of Australian women high jumpers.

Olyslagers set Australian and Oceanian records with a personal best 2.00 m jump on 18 April 2021. She improved her personal best to 2.01 in Stockholm on 4 July 2021 and to 2.02 at the Tokyo Olympics on 7 August 2021, winning silver.

In March 2024, Olyslagers won a gold medal at the World Indoor Championships in Glasgow.

After her 2025 season, in which she captured both the indoor and outdoor titles, reset the Oceanian record to 2.04m, finished the year as world leader, and claimed the Diamond League crown, Olyslagers was named World Athletics Field Athlete of the Year for 2025 at the World Athletic Awards.

=== International competitions ===
Representing Australia
Year	Competition	Venue	Position	Notes
2014	World Junior Championships	Eugene, United States	16th (q)	1.79 m
2015	Universiade	Gwangju, South Korea	4th	1.80 m
2017	Universiade	Taipei, Taiwan	7th	1.88 m
2018	Commonwealth Games	Gold Coast, Australia	3rd	1.91 m
2018	IAAF Continental Cup	Győr, Hungary	5th	1.87 m
2019	World Championships	Doha, Qatar	15th (q)	1.90 m
2021	Olympic Games	Tokyo, Japan	2nd	2.02 m (AR)
2022	World Championships	Eugene, United States	5th	1.96 m
2023	World Championships	Budapest, Hungary	3rd	1.99 m
2024	World Indoor Championships	Glasgow, United Kingdom	1st	1.99 m
2024	Olympic Games	Paris, France	2nd	2.00 m
2025	World Indoor Championships	Nanjing, China	1st	1.97 m
2025	World Championships	Tokyo, Japan	1st	2.00 m
2026	World Indoor Championships	Toruń, Poland	2nd	1.99 m
2026	Commonwealth Games	Glasgow, United Kingdom	2nd	1.93 m
2026	World Ultimate Championship	Budapest, Hungary	2nd	1.95 m

== Personal life ==
Olyslagers is of maternal Croatian ancestry, hailing from the island of Korčula. Olyslagers had always been tall for her age, and says that she was not good at sports in her early years due to a lack of coordination. After she was introduced to athletics at school at age of seven and won the majority of the events from shotput to 200m, her parents got her involved with Little Athletics.

She studied biochemistry at the University of Sydney. Her sports idol is Blanka Vlašić.

Olyslagers is a devout evangelical Christian, and is a member of a Pentecostal denomination that she prefers not to name. She became a Christian while attending a youth camp at the age of 16, and has regularly pointed to her beliefs as a source of inspiration.

Olyslagers runs Everlasting Crowns, a ministry dedicated to encouraging and teaching athletes.

She married Rhys Olyslagers in April 2022, and since then has competed as Nicola Olyslagers.
