= Eleanor Patterson =

Australian high jumper (born 1996)

- Eleanor Patterson at the Wanda Diamond League’s 2026 Weltklasse Zürich.

Personal information
- Nationality: Australian
- Born: 22 May 1996 (age 30) Leongatha, Victoria, Australia
- Height: 1.82 m (6 ft 0 in)
- Weight: 65 kg (143 lb)

Sport
- Sport: Track and field
- Event: High jump

Achievements and titles
- Personal best: 2.02 m (6 ft 7 1/2 in) (2022)
Medal record
Women's athletics
Representing Australia
Olympic Games
Bronze medal – third place	2024 Paris	High jump
World Championships
Gold medal – first place	2022 Eugene	High jump
Silver medal – second place	2023 Budapest	High jump
World Ultimate Championship
Third place	2026 Budapest	High jump
World Indoor Championships
Silver medal – second place	2022 Belgrade	High jump
Silver medal – second place	2025 Nanjing	High jump
Commonwealth Games
Gold medal – first place	2014 Glasgow	High jump
Gold medal – first place	2026 Glasgow	High jump
Silver medal – second place	2022 Birmingham	High jump
World Youth Championships
Gold medal – first place	2013 Donetsk	High jump

Eleanor Patterson (born 22 May 1996) is an Australian track and field athlete who competes in the high jump. She won the gold medal at the 2022 World Championships, placed second at the 2023 World Championships and also won the bronze medal at the 2024 Summer Olympics.

== Career ==
Born in Leongatha, Victoria, Patterson began competing in the high jump as a child. She went to Little Athletics with her friend and fell in love with the sport. Patterson competed in many local events. She was runner-up at the national junior (under-20) championships in 2011, setting a personal best of 1.82 m (5 ft 11 1/2 in) at the age of 14. She returned the following year to win that title and improved to 1.87 m (6 ft 1 1/2 in) that November.

In her first international competition, Patterson won the gold medal at the 2013 World Youth Championships, setting a personal best of 1.88 m (6 ft 2 in) to win by a margin of six centimetres. In December, she broke records at the Australian Schools Championships, clearing a height of 1.96 m (6 ft 5 in) to equal the world youth best held by Charmaine Gale-Weavers (set in 1981) and Olga Turchak (set in 1984) and set a new Oceanian junior record. The 17-year-old had three attempts at the Australian senior record of 1.98 m (6 ft 5 3/4 in), but had three failures.

Patterson was regularly over 1.90 m during the 2014 season, winning a fourth straight Australian junior title and taking her first senior national title at the Australian Championships. She also won at the Melbourne Track Classic meet with a jump of 1.92 m (6 ft 3 1/2 in). Patterson decided to miss the 2014 World Junior Championships in order to represent Australia at the 2014 Commonwealth Games instead. The move paid off as she jumped 1.94 m (6 ft 4 1/4 in) to win the gold medal ahead of England's Isobel Pooley. This made the 18-year-old the third youngest Australian Commonwealth Games champion ever.

Patterson finished eighth at the 2015 World Championships. She competed at the 2016 Summer Olympics but did not qualify for the final. Patterson did not make the 2018 Commonwealth Games squad; disappointed, she took a year off from the sport before returning in 2019.

In 2020, Patterson set a new Australian record, jumping 1.99 m in New Zealand. Having qualified for the 2020 Summer Olympics in Tokyo, she jumped 1.95 m in qualifying and then 1.96 m to place fifth in the final.

In March 2022, at the 2022 World Indoor Championships in Belgrade, Patterson set a new Oceania indoor record, jumping 2.00 m to win the silver medal. In July, she won the gold medal at the 2022 World Championships in Eugene, Oregon, tying the Australian national record of 2.02 m. In August, she won the silver medal at the 2022 Commonwealth Games. The following year, Patterson won the silver medal at the 2023 World Championships.

== International competitions ==
Representing Australia
Year	Competition	Venue	Position	Notes
2013	World Youth Championships	Donetsk, Ukraine	1st	1.88 m
2014	Commonwealth Games	Glasgow, United Kingdom	1st	1.94 m
2015	World Championships	Beijing, China	8th	1.92 m
2016	Olympic Games	Rio de Janeiro, Brazil	22nd (q)	1.89 m
2021	Olympic Games	Tokyo, Japan	5th	1.96 m
2022	World Indoor Championships	Belgrade, Serbia	2nd	2.00 m
2022	World Championships	Eugene, United States	1st	2.02 m
2022	Commonwealth Games	Birmingham, United Kingdom	2nd	1.92 m
2023	World Championships	Budapest, Hungary	2nd	1.99 m
2024	Olympic Games	Paris, France	3rd	1.95 m
2025	World Indoor Championships	Nanjing, China	2nd	1.97 m
2025	World Championships	Tokyo, Japan	5th	1.97 m
2026	World Indoor Championships	Toruń, Poland	7th	1.93 m
2026	Commonwealth Games	Glasgow, United Kingdom	1st	1.96 m
2026	World Ultimate Championship	Budapest, Hungary	3rd	1.91 m

.
