= Athletics at the 2026 Asian Games – Women's high jump =

Women's high jump at the 2026 Asian Games
- Venue: Mizuho Park Athletics Stadium
- Date: 29 September 2026
- Competitors: 15 from 9 nations
- Winning height: 1.90 m

Medalists
gold medal	Barnokhon Sayfullayeva	Uzbekistan
silver medal	Kristina Ovchinnikova	Kazakhstan
bronze medal	Pooja Singh	India

The women's high jump competition at the 2026 Asian Games took place on 29 September 2026 at the Mizuho Park Athletics Stadium, Nagoya. The event was competed by 15 competitors from nine nations. Barnokhon Sayfullayeva of Uzbekistan won the gold with a personal record jump of 1.90 m (6 ft 3 in). Kristina Ovchinnikova of Kazakhstan and Pooja Singh of India won the silver and bronze medals respectively.

== Background ==
The women's high jump event was first contested at the inaugural Asian Games in 1951. It has been contested at every edition of the Asian Games since then.

Uzbekistan's Safina Sadullayeva was the defending Asian Games champion, having won the gold medal at the 2022 Asian Games in Hangzhou with a jump of 1.86 m (6 ft 1 in). Kazakhstan's Nadezhda Dubovitskaya was the Asian record holder with a clearance of 2.00 m (6 ft 7 in), achieved in Almaty on 8 June 2021.

Kazakhstan's Kristina Ovchinnikova had a personal best of 1.96 m (6 ft 5 in), first achieved in June 2021, which she equalled in June 2022. She won the gold medal at the 2023 Asian Athletics Championships in Bangkok with a jump of 1.86 m (6 ft 1 in) and was also a silver medallist at the 2023 Asian Indoor Athletics Championships.

India's Pooja Singh won the gold medal at the 2025 Asian Athletics Championships in Gumi, South Korea. In May 2026, won the gold medal at the 2026 Asian U20 Athletics Championships in Hong Kong with a jump of 1.93 m (6 ft 4 in). Her jump a set a new Indian national record, breaking the previous mark of 1.92 m (6 ft 4 in) set by Sahana Kumari in 2012 and also broke the Asian U20 Championships record of 1.90 m (6 ft 3 in), which had been held by Uzbekistan's Svetlana Radzivil since 2006. She had previously won silver at the 2023 edition of the Asian U20 Championships.

Uzbekistan's Barnokhon Sayfullayeva won the women's high jump titles in the 2023 and 2024 editions of the Asian U20 Athletics Championships. In April 2026, she won the inaugural women's high jump competition at the 2026 Asian Beach Games in Sanya, clearing 1.85 m (6 ft 1 in).

== Schedule ==
The medalists in the women's high jump event was decided in a single final on 29 September 2026 held at the Mizuho Park Athletics Stadium in Nagoya.

All times are Japan Standard Time (UTC+09:00)

Schedule
Date	Time	Event
29 September 2026	19:05	Final

== Records ==
Prior to this competition, the existing world, Asian and Games records were as follows.

World Record	Yaroslava Mahuchikh (UKR)	2.10	Paris, France	7 July 2024
Asian Record	Nadezhda Dubovitskaya (KAZ)	2.00	Almaty, Kazakhstan	7 July 2024
Games Record	Svetlana Radzivil (UZB)	1.96	Jakarta, Indonesia	29 August 2018

== Summary ==
The event was competed by 15 competitors from nine nations. Sayfullayeva won the gold medal with a personal record jump of 1.90 m (6 ft 3 in). This was Uzbekistan's fifth consecutive gold medal in the women's high jump event at the Asian Games. Kazakhstan's Ovchinnikova took the silver medal with a jump of 1.87 m (6 ft 2 in). She cleared the height in her third attempt before failing to clear 1.90 m (6 ft 3 in) in three attempts. This was Kazakhstan's best finish in the event since Marina Aitova won the gold medal at the 2006 Asian Games.

India's Pooja Singh won the bronze medal after clearing 1.84 m (6 ft 0 in) in her first attempt. Her medal was India's first in the women's high jump at the Asian Games since Bobby Aloysius won the silver medal at the 2002 Asian Games. While China's Lu Jiawen and Kazakhstan's Nadezhda Dubovitskaya also cleared 1.84 m (6 ft 0 in), Pooja won the bronze medal on countback having cleared it during her first attempt. Jiawen cleared it in her second attempt while Dubovitskaya cleared it in her third attempt.

== Results ==
Rank	Athlete	Attempt								Result	Notes
Rank	Athlete	1.65	1.70	1.75	1.80	1.84	1.87	1.90	1.92	Result	Notes
1st place, gold medalist(s)	Barnokhon Sayfullayeva (UZB)	–	–	O	O	O	XO	XO	XXX	1.90	PB
2nd place, silver medalist(s)	Kristina Ovchinnikova (KAZ)	–	–	–	O	O	XXO	XXX		1.87	
3rd place, bronze medalist(s)	Pooja Singh (IND)	–	O	O	O	O	XXX			1.84	
4	Lu Jiawen (CHN)	–	O	O	XXO	XO	XXX			1.84	
5	Nadezhda Dubovitskaya (KAZ)	–	O	O	XO	XXO	XXX			1.84	
6	Valeriya Gorbatova (UZB)	–	O	O	O	XXX				1.80	
6	Dương Thị Thảo (VIE)	–	O	O	O	XXX				1.80	SB
8	Yuzuki Ishioka (JPN)	–	–	O	XO	XXX				1.80	
9	Nagisa Takahashi (JPN)	–	–	XXO	XXO	XXX				1.80	
10	Jin Ruoxuan (CHN)	O	O	O	XXX					1.75	
10	Chung Wai Yan (HKG)	O	O	O	XXX					1.75	
12	Supriya Basavaraju (IND)	XO	O	O	XXX					1.75	
13	Cheung Ching Laam Priscilia (HKG)	O	O	XXO	XXX					1.75	
13	Aliya Al Mughairi (OMA)	O	O	XXO	XXX					1.75	PB
15	Jhang Chiau-yin (TPE)	–	O	XXX						1.70	
