= 2025 Asian Athletics Championships – Women's high jump =

Women's high jump at the 2025 Asian Athletics Championships
- Venue: Gumi Civic Stadium
- Location: Gumi, South Korea
- Dates: 30 May
- Competitors: 14 from 11 nations
- Winning height: 1.89 m

Medalists
gold medal	Pooja Singh	India
silver medal	Safina Sadullayeva	Uzbekistan
silver medal	Yelizaveta Matveyeva	Kazakhstan

The women's high jump event at the 2025 Asian Athletics Championships was held on 30 May.

== Records ==
Records before the 2025 Asian Athletics Championships
Record	Athlete (nation)	Height (m)	Location	Date
World record	Yaroslava Mahuchikh (UKR)	2.10	Paris, France	7 July 2024
Asian record	Nadezhda Dubovitskaya (KAZ)	2.00	Almaty, Kazakhstan	8 June 2021
Championship record	Miki Imai (JPN)	1.94	Fukuoka, Japan	1998
Championship record	Tatyana Efimenko (KGZ)	1.94	Amman, Jordan	28 July 2007
World leading	Yaroslava Mahuchikh (UKR)	2.02	Doha, Qatar	9 May 2025
Asian leading	Nagisa Takahashi (JPN)	1.92	Hustopeče, Czech Republic	8 February 2023

== Schedule ==
The event schedule, in local time (UTC+9), was as follows:

Date	Time	Round
30 May	17:30	Final

== Results ==
Place	Athlete	Nation	1.55	1.65	1.70	1.75	1.80	1.83	1.86	1.89	1.92	Results	Notes
1st place, gold medalist(s)	Pooja Singh	India	-	-	o	o	o	xo	xo	o	xxx	1.89 m	PB
2nd place, silver medalist(s)	Safina Sadullayeva	Uzbekistan	-	-	-	-	o	o	o	xxx		1.86 m	
2nd place, silver medalist(s)	Yelizaveta Matveyeva	Kazakhstan	-	-	-	o	o	o	o	xxx		1.86 m	
4	Nadezhda Dubovitskaya	Kazakhstan	-	-	-	o	o	o	xxo	xxx		1.86 m	SB
5	Barnokhon Sayfullayeva	Uzbekistan	-	-	-	xo	o	o	xxx			1.83 m	SB
5	Dina Nuerlan	China	-	o	o	o	xo	o	xxx			1.83 m	
7	Shieriai Tsuda	Japan	-	-	o	o	o	xxo	xxx			1.83 m	SB
8	Nagisa Takahashi	Japan	-	-	-	o	o	xxx				1.80 m	
9	Chung Wai Yan	Hong Kong	-	o	o	o	xo	xxx				1.80 m	PB
10	Bùi Thị Kim Anh	Vietnam	o	o	o	o	xxx					1.75 m	
10	Cheung Ching Lam	Hong Kong	-	o	o	o	xxx					1.75 m	
12	Jang Sun-yeong	South Korea	-	o	o	o	xxx					1.75 m	
12	Thanlada Thongchomphunut	Thailand	-	o	xo	o	xxx					1.75 m	
14	Most Ritu Akhtar	Bangladesh	-	o	xo	xxx						1.70 m	
