= 2023 Asian Athletics Championships – Women's high jump =

Women's high jump at the 2023 Asian Athletics Championships
- Venue: National Stadium
- Location: Bangkok, Thailand
- Dates: 13 July
- Competitors: 16 from 11 nations
- Winning height: 1.86 m

Medalists
gold medal	Kristina Ovchinnikova	Kazakhstan
silver medal	Yelizaveta Matveyeva	Kazakhstan
bronze medal	Svetlana Radzivil	Uzbekistan

The women's high jump event at the 2023 Asian Athletics Championships was held on 13 July.

== Records ==
Records before the 2023 Asian Athletics Championships
Record	Athlete (nation)	Height (m)	Location	Date
World record	Stefka Kostadinova (BUL)	2.09	Rome, Italy	30 August 1987
Asian record	Nadezhda Dubovitskaya (KAZ)	2.00	Almaty, Kazakhstan	8 June 2021
Championship record	Miki Imai (JPN)	1.94	Fukuoka, Japan	1998
Championship record	Tatyana Efimenko (KGZ)	1.94	Amman, Jordan	28 July 2007
World leading	Yaroslava Mahuchikh (UKR)	2.02	Metz, France	11 February 2023
Asian leading	Kristina Ovchinnikova (KAZ)	1.95	Hustopeče, Czech Republic	4 February 2023

== Results ==
Rank	Name	Nationality	1.60	1.70	1.75	1.80	1.83	1.86	1.89	Result	Notes
1st place, gold medalist(s)	Kristina Ovchinnikova	Kazakhstan	–	–	o	o	xxo	o	xx	1.86	
2nd place, silver medalist(s)	Yelizaveta Matveyeva	Kazakhstan	–	o	o	o	xxo	xo	xxx	1.86	
3rd place, bronze medalist(s)	Svetlana Radzivil	Uzbekistan	–	–	o	o	o	xxx		1.83	
4	Lu Jiawen	China	–	o	o	xo	o	xxx		1.83	
4	Nagisa Takahashi	Japan	–	–	xo	o	o	xxx		1.83	
6	Li Ching-ching	Chinese Taipei	–	o	–	o	xxx			1.80	
7	Pooja Singh	India	o	o	o	xxx				1.75	
7	Aleksandra Sharkayeva	Uzbekistan	–	–	o	xxx				1.75	
7	Rubina Yadav	India	o	o	o	xxx				1.75	
10	Norliana Kamaruddin	Malaysia	o	o	xo	xxx				1.75	
11	Lin Pei-hsuan	Chinese Taipei	–	o	xo	xxx				1.75	
12	Mariam Abdelhameed Abdulelah	Iraq	o	o	xxx					1.70	
12	Ritu Akhter	Bangladesh	o	o	xxx					1.70	
14	Michelle Sng Suat Li	Singapore	–	xo	xxx					1.70	
14	Wong Yuen Nam	Hong Kong	–	xo	xxx					1.70	
	Chung Wai Yan	Hong Kong	–	xxx						NM	
