= Athletics at the 2022 Asian Games – Women's high jump =

Women's high jump at the 2022 Asian Games
- Venue: Hangzhou Olympic Expo Main Stadium
- Date: 3 October 2023
- Competitors: 13 from 8 nations

Medalists
gold medal	Safina Sadullayeva	Uzbekistan
silver medal	Svetlana Radzivil	Uzbekistan
bronze medal	Nadezhda Dubovitskaya	Kazakhstan

The Women's high jump competition at the 2022 Asian Games took place on 3 October 2023 at the HOC Stadium, Hangzhou.

== Schedule ==
All times are China Standard Time (UTC+08:00)

Date	Time	Event
Tuesday, 3 October 2023	19:00	Final

== Records ==
Prior to this competition, the existing world, Asian and Games records were as follows.

World Record	Stefka Kostadinova (BUL)	2.09	Rome, Italy	30 August 1987
Asian Record	Nadezhda Dubovitskaya (KAZ)	2.00	Almaty, Kazakhstan	8 June 2021
Games Record	Svetlana Radzivil (UZB)	1.96	Jakarta, Indonesia	29 August 2018

== Results ==
Rank	Athlete	Attempt							Result	Notes
Rank	Athlete	1.65	1.70	1.75	1.80	1.83	1.86	1.89	Result	Notes
1st place, gold medalist(s)	Safina Sadullayeva (UZB)	–	–	O	O	O	O	XXX	1.86	
2nd place, silver medalist(s)	Svetlana Radzivil (UZB)	–	–	O	XO	XO	XO	XXX	1.86	
3rd place, bronze medalist(s)	Nadezhda Dubovitskaya (KAZ)	–	–	–	O	O	XXO	XXX	1.86	
4	Kristina Ovchinnikova (KAZ)	–	–	XO	O	XXO	XXX		1.83	
5	Chung Wai Yan (HKG)	–	O	XO	XO	XXX			1.80	
6	Pooja Singh (IND)	O	O	XO	XXO	XXX			1.80	
7	Lee Ching-ching (TPE)	–	O	O	XXX				1.75	
7	Wong Yuen Nam (HKG)	–	O	O	XXX				1.75	
9	Rubina Yadav (IND)	O	O	XO	XXX				1.75	
10	Oh Su-jeong (KOR)	O	O	XXO	XXX				1.75	
11	Lin Pei-hsuan (TPE)	–	XO	XXO	XXX				1.75	
12	Michelle Sng (SGP)	XO	XO	XXX					1.70	
13	Norliyana Kamaruddin (MAS)	XO	XXX						1.65	
