= Athletics at the 2024 Summer Olympics – Women's high jump =

Women's high jump at the Games of the XXXIII Olympiad
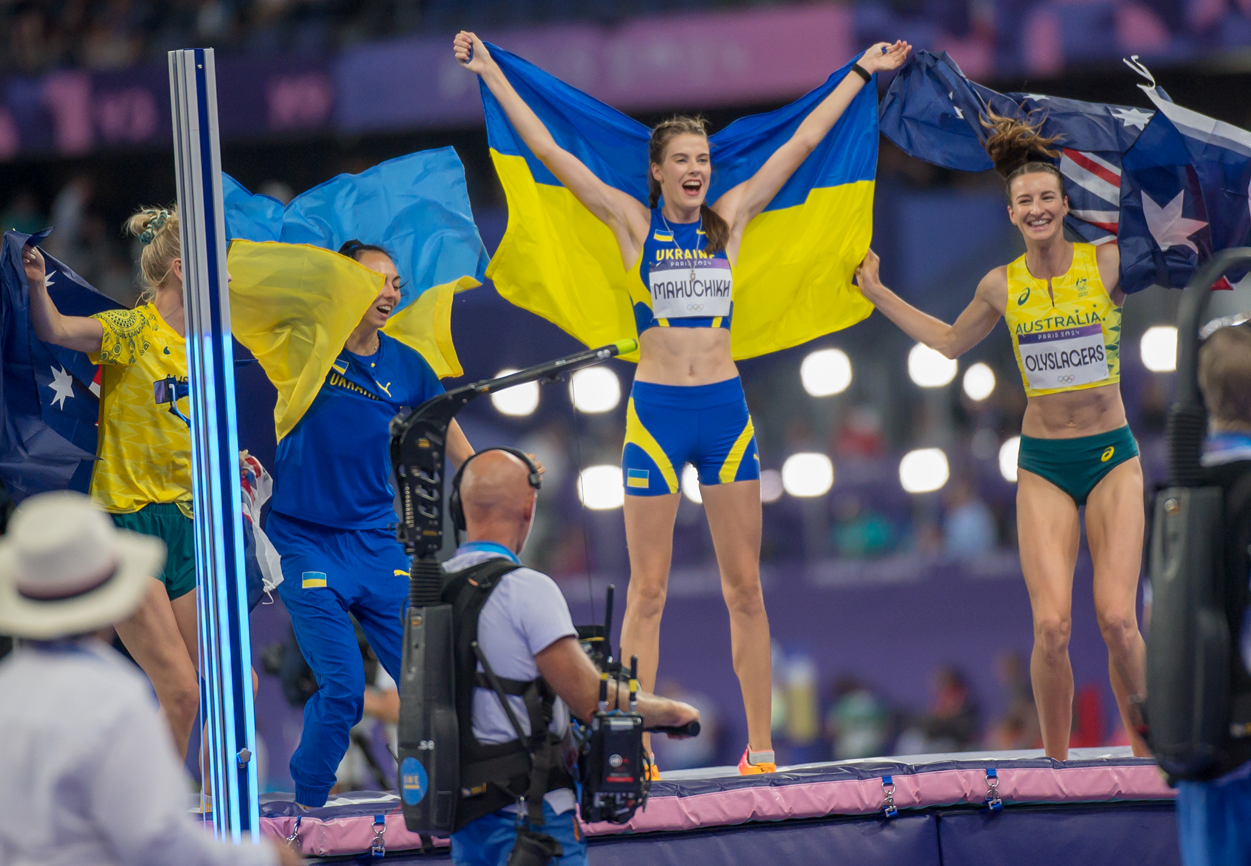
- Venue: Stade de France, Paris, France
- Date: 2 August 2024 (qualification) 4 August 2024 (final)
- Competitors: 32 from 24 nations
- Winning height: 2.00 m

Medalists
1st place, gold medalist(s)		Yaroslava Mahuchikh	Ukraine
2nd place, silver medalist(s)		Nicola Olyslagers	Australia
3rd place, bronze medalist(s)		Iryna Herashchenko	Ukraine
3rd place, bronze medalist(s)		Eleanor Patterson	Australia

The women's high jump at the 2024 Summer Olympics was held in Paris, France, on 2 and 4 August 2024. This was the 23rd time that the event was contested at the Summer Olympics.

== Summary ==
The high jump season included the surprise world record of Yaroslava Mahuchikh. Less than a month before this competition at the 2024 Meeting de Paris, held across town at the Stade Sébastien Charléty, Mahuchikh had already cleared 2.03 m to win the competition. A high jump competition only ends with three failures or a withdrawal. As the winner, she could choose where to set the bar again. She chose 2.07 m and cleared it, so the competition continued. She set the bar to the rarely even attempted 2.10 m (6 ft 10 1/2 in) and cleared it on her first attempt, breaking the 37-year-old record of 2.09 m by Stefka Kostadinova. It was one of the longest-standing records on the books, set back at the 1987 World Championships.

During the season, other than Mahuchikh who won bronze at the previous Olympics, the only other athletes to clear 2 metres were Nicola Olyslagers (2.03 m), the returning silver medalist; Lamara Distin; Rachel Glenn; and Natalya Spiridonova, a Russian not invited to the Olympics. Another Russian not invited was the defending champion Mariya Lasitskene. Eleanor Patterson was the reigning silver medalist from the World Championships.

The qualifying round selected twelve athletes plus ties or a 1.97 m would make an automatic Q; only six competitors cleared 1.95 m. Qualifying went as low as 1.92 m and four misses. Mahuchikh and Olyslagers led qualifying with the only two clean rounds. Patterson had one miss, and Iryna Herashchenko had two. Distin and Glenn did not qualify.

Thirteen athletes qualified to the final, but only eleven took jumps. Only eight cleared 1.91 m (6 ft 3 in), and 1.95 m (6 ft 4 3/4 in) decided the medals. Vashti Cunningham, Herashchenko, Patterson, Olyslagers, and Mahuchikh got over on their first attempt. Cunningham had one miss earlier, so the others were tied for the lead. Olyslagers and Mahuchikh cleared the next height, 1.98 m (6 ft 5 3/4 in), on their first attempt. When none of the others could get over 1.98 m, the count back went to the standings at 1.95 m, leaving Herashchenko and Patterson tied for bronze and Cunningham off the podium. The competition continued to two meters; Olyslagers had her first miss, while Mahuchikh again flew over the bar on her first attempt. Olyslagers missed again and was down to her last attempt. With her diary note-taking and eccentric concentration mannerisms, Olyslagers rattled her way over, and the bar stayed up. The competition continued, but Mahuchikh now had the lead. With Olyslagers jumping first, neither cleared 2.02 m (6 ft 7 1/2 in). When Olyslagers failed on her third attempt, the gold was confirmed for Mahuchikh. Amid the celebration, Mahuchikh had the bar raised to 2.04 m (6 ft 8 1/4 in) for one last attempt, but did not clear it.

== Background ==
The women's high jump has been present on the Olympic athletics programme since 1928.

Global records before the 2024 Summer Olympics
Record	Athlete (Nation)	Height (m)	Location	Date
World record	Yaroslava Mahuchikh (UKR)	2.10	Paris, France	7 July 2024
Olympic record	Yelena Slesarenko (RUS)	2.06	Athens, Greece	28 August 2004
World leading	Yaroslava Mahuchikh (UKR)	2.10	Paris, France	7 July 2024

Area records before the 2024 Summer Olympics
Area Record	Athlete (Nation)	Height (m)
Africa (records)	Hestrie Cloete (RSA)	2.06
Asia (records)	Nadezhda Dubovitskaya (KAZ)	2.00
Europe (records)	Yaroslava Mahuchikh (UKR)	2.10 WR
North, Central America and Caribbean (records)	Chaunté Lowe (USA)	2.05
Oceania (records)	Nicola Olyslagers (AUS)	2.03
South America (records)	Solange Witteveen (ARG)	1.96

== Qualification ==
For the women's high jump event, the qualification period was between 1 July 2023 and 30 June 2024. 32 athletes were able to qualify for the event, with a maximum of three athletes per nation, by jumping the entry standard of 1.97 m or higher or by their World Athletics Ranking for this event.

== Results ==
=== Qualification ===
The qualification was held on 2 August, starting at 10:15 (UTC+2) in the morning. All athletes meeting the Qualification Standard 1.97 (Q) or at least the 12 best performers (q) advanced to the final.

Rank	Group	Athlete	Nation	1.83	1.88	1.92	1.95	1.97	Height	Notes
1	A	Yaroslava Mahuchikh	Ukraine	–	–	o	o	r	1.95	q
1	B	Nicola Olyslagers	Australia	–	o	o	o	r	1.95	q
3	A	Eleanor Patterson	Australia	–	o	xo	o	r	1.95	q, =SB
4	B	Iryna Herashchenko	Ukraine	o	o	xo	xo	r	1.95	q, =SB
5	B	Safina Sadullayeva	Uzbekistan	o	o	o	xxo	r	1.95	q, SB
6	A	Christina Honsel	Germany	o	xo	xo	xxo	r	1.95	q, =SB
7	A	Elena Kulichenko	Cyprus	o	xo	o	xxx		1.92	q
8	B	Tatiana Gusin	Greece	o	o	xo	xxx		1.92	q
8	B	Nawal Meniker	France	o	o	xo	xxx		1.92	q
8	B	Buse Savaşkan	Turkey	o	o	xo	xxx		1.92	q, =PB
11	A	Valdiléia Martins	Brazil	o	xo	xo	xxr		1.92	q, =NR
12	B	Vashti Cunningham	United States	o	xxo	xxo	xxx		1.92	q
12	A	Angelina Topić	Serbia	–	xxo	xxo	xxx		1.92	q
14	B	Imke Onnen	Germany	xo	xxo	xxo	xxx		1.92	
15	A	Rachel Glenn	United States	o	o	xxx			1.88	
15	A	Michaela Hrubá	Czech Republic	o	o	xxx			1.88	
15	A	Morgan Lake	Great Britain	o	o	xxx			1.88	
15	B	Airinė Palšytė	Lithuania	o	o	xxx			1.88	
19	B	Temitope Adeshina	Nigeria	o	xo	xxx			1.88	
19	A	Mirela Demireva	Bulgaria	o	xo	xxx			1.88	
19	A	Solène Gicquel	France	o	xo	xxx			1.88	
19	A	Yelizaveta Matveyeva	Kazakhstan	o	xo	xxx			1.88	
19	A	Daniela Stanciu	Romania	o	xo	xxx			1.88	SB
24	B	Lamara Distin	Jamaica	xo	xo	xxx			1.88	
25	A	Rose Amoanimaa Yeboah	Ghana	xo	xxo	xxx			1.88	
26	B	Elisabeth Pihela	Estonia	o	xxx				1.83	
26	B	Lia Apostolovski	Slovenia	o	xxx				1.83	
28	B	Nadezhda Dubovitskaya	Kazakhstan	xo	xxx				1.83	
28	B	Ella Junnila	Finland	xo	xxx				1.83	
28	A	Maria Żodzik	Poland	xo	xxx				1.83	
	A	Panagiota Dosi	Greece	xxx					NM	
	B	Yuliya Levchenko	Ukraine	xxx					NM	

=== Final ===
The final was held on 4 August, starting at 19:50 (UTC+2) in the evening.

Rank	Athlete	Nation	1.86m	1.91m	1.95m	1.98m	2.00m	2.02m	2.04m	Height	Notes
1st place, gold medalist(s)	Yaroslava Mahuchikh	Ukraine	—	o	o	o	o	xx-	x	2.00	
2nd place, silver medalist(s)	Nicola Olyslagers	Australia	—	o	o	o	xxo	xxx		2.00	
3rd place, bronze medalist(s)	Iryna Herashchenko	Ukraine	o	o	o	xxx				1.95	=SB
3rd place, bronze medalist(s)	Eleanor Patterson	Australia	o	o	o	xxx				1.95	=SB
5	Vashti Cunningham	United States	o	xo	o	xxx				1.95	
6	Christina Honsel	Germany	xo	o	xo	xxx				1.95	=SB
7	Elena Kulichenko	Cyprus	o	xo	xxo	xxx				1.95	
7	Safina Sadullayeva	Uzbekistan	o	xo	xxo	xxx				1.95	=SB
9	Tatiana Gusin	Greece	o	xxx						1.86	
10	Buse Savaşkan	Turkey	xo	xxx						1.86	
11	Nawal Meniker	France	xxo	xxx						1.86	
	Valdiléia Martins	Brazil	r								NM
	Angelina Topić	Serbia									DNS
