= 2024 World Athletics U20 Championships – Women's high jump =

Women's high jump at the 2024 World Athletics U20 Championships
- Venue: Estadio Atlético de la VIDENA
- Dates: 29 August 2024 (qualification); 31 August 2024 (final)
- Competitors: 29
- Winning height: 1.91 m

Medalists
| gold medal | Angelina Topić | Serbia |
| silver medal | Izobelle Louison-Roe | Australia |
| bronze medal | Karmen Bruus | Estonia |

The women's high jump at the 2024 World Athletics U20 Championships was held at the Estadio Atlético de la VIDENA in Lima, Peru on 29 and 31 August 2024.

== Records ==
U20 standing records prior to the 2024 World Athletics U20 Championships were as follows:

| Record | Athlete & Nationality | Mark | Location | Date |
|---|---|---|---|---|
| World U20 Record | Yaroslava Mahuchikh (UKR) | 2.01 | Doha, Qatar | 30 September 2019 |
| Championship Record | Alina Astafei (ROM) | 2.00 | Sudbury, Canada | 29 July 1988 |
| World U20 Leading | Angelina Topić (SRB) | 1.98 | Marrakesh, Morocco | 19 May 2024 |
| World U20 Leading | Angelina Topić (SRB) | 1.98 | Paris, France | 7 July 2024 |

== Results ==
=== Qualification ===
Athletes attaining a mark of at least 1.85 metres (Q) or at least the 12 best performers (q) qualified for the final.

==== Group A ====
| Rank | Athlete | Nation | 1.65 | 1.69 | 1.73 | 1.77 | 1.80 | 1.83 | 1.85 | Mark | Notes |
|---|---|---|---|---|---|---|---|---|---|---|---|
| 1 | María Arboleda | Colombia | – | – | – | o | o | o | | 1.83 | q |
| 1 | Karmen Bruus | Estonia | – | – | o | o | o | o | | 1.83 | q |
| 1 | Izobelle Louison-Roe | Australia | – | o | o | o | o | o | | 1.83 | q |
| 1 | Angelina Topić | Serbia | – | – | – | o | o | o | | 1.83 | q |
| 5 | Cheyla Scott | United States | – | o | xxo | o | xxo | o | | 1.83 | q |
| 6 | Lilianna Bátori | Hungary | – | o | o | o | o | xo | | 1.83 | q |
| 7 | Aurora Vicini | Italy | – | – | o | o | o | xxo | | 1.83 | q |
| 8 | Johanna Göring | Germany | – | – | o | xo | xo | xxo | | 1.83 | q |
| 9 | Merel Maes | Belgium | – | – | o | o | o | xxx | | 1.80 | q |
| 10 | Engla Nilsson | Sweden | – | – | o | o | xo | xxx | | 1.80 | |
| 11 | Patrīcija Jansone | Latvia | – | o | xo | o | xo | xxx | | 1.80 | |
| 12 | Ona Bonet | Spain | o | o | o | o | xx– | x | | 1.77 | |
| 13 | Renata Láníková | Czech Republic | o | o | xo | o | xxx | | | 1.77 | |
| 14 | Arienne Birch | Canada | – | xxo | o | xxo | xxx | | | 1.77 | |
| 15 | Iren Sarâboyukova | Bulgaria | o | o | xx– | | | | | 1.69 | |

==== Group B ====
| Rank | Athlete | Nation | 1.65 | 1.69 | 1.73 | 1.77 | 1.80 | 1.83 | 1.85 | Mark | Notes |
|---|---|---|---|---|---|---|---|---|---|---|---|
| 1 | Barnokhon Sayfullayeva | Uzbekistan | – | – | o | o | o | xxo | | 1.83 | q |
| 2 | Pooja Singh | India | o | o | xxo | o | o | xxo | | 1.83 | q, NU20R |
| 3 | Maelle Gauthier | France | – | o | o | o | o | xxx | | 1.80 | q |
| 4 | Ella Obeta | Germany | o | o | o | xo | o | xxx | | 1.80 | |
| 5 | Ela Velepec | Slovenia | – | o | xo | o | xo | xxx | | 1.80 | |
| 6 | Valeria Smirnova | Estonia | – | – | o | xo | xxo | xxx | | 1.80 | |
| 7 | Tricia Madourie | Canada | – | – | o | xxo | xxo | xxx | | 1.80 | PB |
| 8 | Claire Lowrey | United States | – | o | o | xxo | xxx | | | 1.77 | |
| 8 | Shanniqua Williams | Jamaica | o | o | o | xxo | xxx | | | 1.77 | |
| 10 | Anna Hrbáčová | Czech Republic | xo | o | o | xxx | | | | 1.73 | |
| 10 | Toby Stolberg | Australia | – | xo | o | xxx | | | | 1.73 | |
| 12 | Loreta Bērziņa | Latvia | o | o | xo | xxx | | | | 1.73 | |
| 13 | Faina Meirmanova | Kazakhstan | o | o | xxo | xxx | | | | 1.73 | |
| 14 | Naomi White | New Zealand | o | o | xxx | | | | | 1.69 | |

=== Final ===
| Rank | Athlete | Nation | 1.75 | 1.80 | 1.84 | 1.87 | 1.89 | 1.91 | Mark | Notes |
|---|---|---|---|---|---|---|---|---|---|---|
| 1st place, gold medalist(s) | Angelina Topić | Serbia | – | o | o | o | xxo | o | 1.91 | |
| 2nd place, silver medalist(s) | Izobelle Louison-Roe | Australia | o | o | xo | xo | o | xxx | 1.89 | PB |
| 3rd place, bronze medalist(s) | Karmen Bruus | Estonia | o | o | o | o | xxo | xxx | 1.89 | SB |
| 4 | Lilianna Bátori | Hungary | xo | o | xo | o | xxx | | 1.87 | =PB |
| 5 | María Arboleda | Colombia | o | o | o | xo | xxx | | 1.87 | PB |
| 6 | Barnokhon Sayfullayeva | Uzbekistan | o | o | xo | xxx | | | 1.84 | =PB |
| 7 | Merel Maes | Belgium | o | o | xxo | xxx | | | 1.84 | |
| 8 | Johanna Göring | Germany | o | o | xxx | | | | 1.80 | |
| 9 | Pooja Singh | India | xo | o | xxx | | | | 1.80 | |
| 10 | Cheyla Scott | United States | xo | xo | xxx | | | | 1.80 | |
| 11 | Maelle Gauthier | France | o | xxo | xxx | | | | 1.80 | |
| 12 | Aurora Vicini | Italy | o | xxx | | | | | 1.75 | |
