= Rachel Glenn =

American high jump athlete

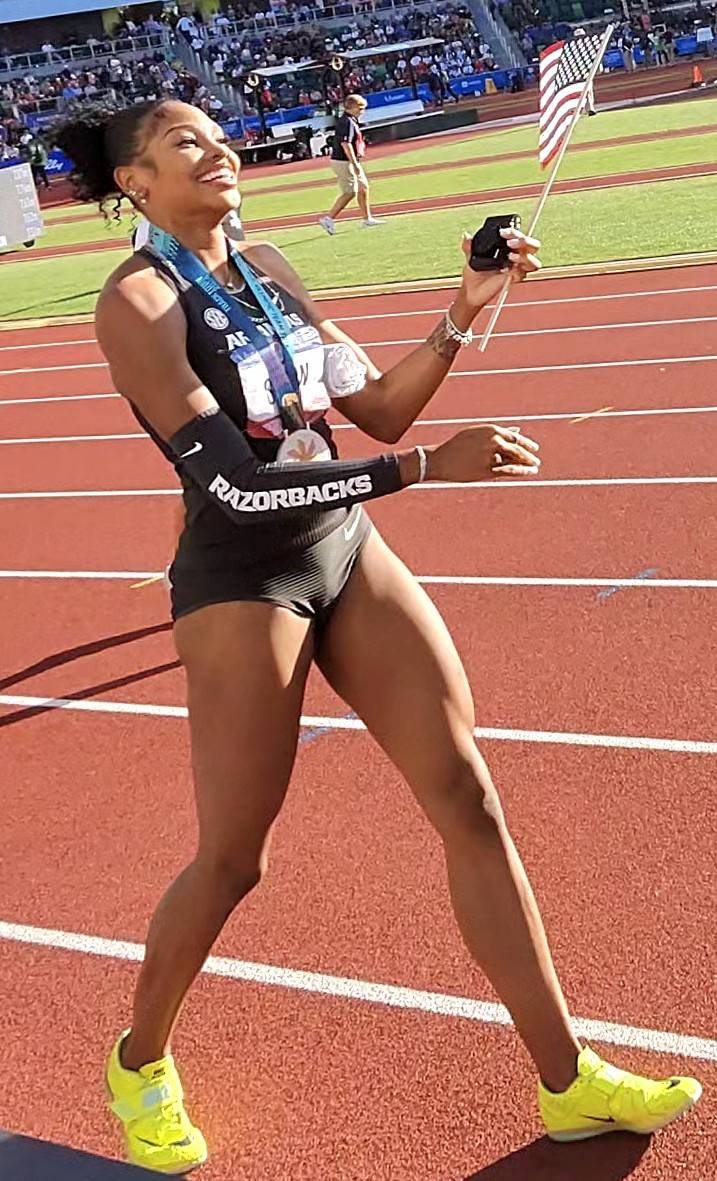
- Glenn at the 2024 United States Olympic trials

Personal information
- Full name: Rachel Symone Glenn
- Nationality: American
- Born: April 17, 2002 (age 24)
- Home town: Long Beach, California, U.S.
- Height: 6 ft 2 in (188 cm)

Sport
- Sport: Athletics
- Events: High jump, Hurdles

Achievements and titles
- Personal bests: High jump: 2.00m (Boston, 2024); 400m hurdles: 53.46 (Eugene, 2024)
Medal record
Women's athletics
Representing the United States
NACAC Championships
Silver medal – second place	2022 Freeport	High jump

Rachel Symone Glenn (born April 17, 2002) is an American track and field athlete who competes in the high jump and 400m hurdles.

== Early life ==
Glenn attended Woodrow Wilson Classical High School in Long Beach, California and initially competed in athletics as a 400 metres runner before switching to high jump in 2018. Shortly afterwards she recorded a height of 1.80 metres at the Cal Relays at El Camino College.

== Career ==
In her first year at the University of South Carolina, Glenn won the SEC Outdoor Championship and the 2021 NCAA Division I Outdoor Track and Field Championships title just a few weeks later.

Glenn was an NACAC Championships silver medallist in Freeport, Bahamas in August 2022 behind compatriot Vashti Cunningham, with a height of 1.84m. That year, she competed at the 2022 World Athletics Championships in Eugene, Oregon.

In 2023, she transferred to the University of Arkansas. In February 2024, she set an indoor personal best of 1.90m at the Tyson Invitational at Randal Tyson Track Center in Fayetteville. She won the NCAA Indoor Championships in March 2024 in Boston, Massachusetts with a personal best, championship record and collegiate best equaling height of 2.00 metres. The height also placed her third on the US all-time list.

At the 2024 NCAA Division I Outdoor Track and Field Championships, Glenn finished third in the 400m hurdles and 13th in the high jump.

She competed in the high jump at the 2024 Paris Olympics.

== Personal life ==
From Southern California, Glenn signed a NIL contract with the WWE’s Next in Line class of 2022.
