= Lilianna Bátori =

Hungarian high jumper (born 2007)

Personal information
- Born: 14 March 2007 (age 19)

Sport
- Sport: Athletics
- Event: High jumper
- Club: Vasas SC

Achievements and titles
- Personal best: High jump: 1.93m (2025) NU20R
Medal record
Women's athletics
Representing Hungary
World U20 Championships
Silver medal – second place	2026 Eugene	High jump
European U20 Championships
Gold medal – first place	2025 Tampere	High jump
European U18 Championships
Gold medal – first place	2024 Banská Bystrica	High jump

Lilianna Bátori (born 14 March 2007) is a Hungarian high jumper. She is the Hungarian national under-20 record holder at the event. In 2024, became senior national champion for the first time and won the 2024 European U18 Championships and 2025 European U20 Championships. She competed for the senior Hungary team at the 2025 European Athletics Indoor Championships and later won the silver medal at the 2026 World Athletics U20 Championships.

== Biography ==
A member of Vasas SC, she is coached by former decathlete Balázs Kun-Szabó.

She became European U18 champion in the high jump at the 2024 European Athletics U18 Championships in Banská Bystrica, Slovakia, with a best cleared height of 1.84 metres. In June 2024, she won the Hungarian national title at the 2024 Hungarian Athletics Championships, with a personal best 1.87 metres clearance. In August 2024, she finished fourth at the World Athletics U20 Championships in Lima, Peru, equalling her lifetime best of 1.87 metres. In total, she cleared 1.87 metres on four separate occasions in 2024.

In February 2025, she jumped a new personal best of 1.91 metres competing in Udine, Italy. The following week, she set a new national under-20 record whilst competing indoors in Banská Bystrica, Slovakia, with a 1.93 metres clearance. In March 2025, she competed at the 2025 European Athletics Indoor Championships in Apeldoorn, Netherlands. She qualified for the final with a jump of 1.89 metres, before finishing in ninth place overall after not recording a successful jump of 1.85 metres.

In August 2025, she won a gold medal at the 2025 European Athletics U20 Championships in Tampere, Finland with a 1.89 metres clearance to finish ahead of Ella Mikkola and Ona Bonet.

She competed at the 2025 World Athletics Championships in Tokyo, Japan, in September 2025, clearing 1.88 metres without advancing to the final.

Bátori cleared 1.88 metres to win the high jump title at the 2026 Hungarian Indoor Championships in Nyíregyháza. In August 2026, she competed at the 2026 European Athletics Championships in Birmingham, England.
