= 2026 World Athletics U20 Championships – Women's high jump =

Women's high jump at the 2026 World Athletics U20 Championships
- Venue: Hayward Field
- Dates: 7 August (Qualification); 9 August (Final)
- Competitors: 22 from 20 nations
- Winning height: 1.92 m

Medalists
gold medal	Izobelle Louison-Roe	Australia
silver medal	Lilianna Bátori	Hungary
bronze medal	Aitana Alonso	Spain

The women's high jump at the 2026 World Athletics U20 Championships was held at Hayward Field in Eugene, United States on 7 and 9 August 2026.

== Records ==
U20 standing records prior to the 2026 World Athletics U20 Championships were as follows:

Record	Athlete & Nationality	Mark	Location	Date
World U20 Record	Yaroslava Mahuchikh (UKR)	2.01 m	Doha, Qatar	30 September 2019
Championship Record	Alina Astafei (ROM)	2.00 m	Sudbury, Canada	29 July 1988
World U20 Leading	Izobelle Louison-Roe (AUS)	1.95 m	Canberra, Australia	25 January 2026
World U20 Leading	Izobelle Louison-Roe (AUS)	1.95 m	Melbourne, Australia	28 March 2026

== Results ==
=== Qualification ===
Qualification took place in the morning session on 7 August 2026.

==== Group A ====
Place	Athlete	Nation	1.68	1.72	1.76	1.79	Mark	Notes
1	Aitana Alonso	Spain	–	–	o	o	1.79	q
1	Marleen Ritari	Estonia	o	o	o	o	1.79	q
1	Olympia Tzouveli	Greece	–	o	o	o	1.79	q
1	Bailey Hensgens	United States	o	o	o	o	1.79	q
5	Karina Niżyńska	Poland	o	o	xo	xo	1.79	q
6	Maria Clara Vieira	Brazil	o	o	o	xxx	1.76	
6	Sophie Barbagallo	Italy	o	o	o	xxx	1.76	
8	Nadja Lüthi	Switzerland	o	xxo	o	xxx	1.76	
9	Melaniia Vakulina	Ukraine	o	o	xo	xxx	1.76	
10	Michaela Spocter	South Africa	xo	o	xo	xxx	1.76	
11	Siyana Brâmbarova	Bulgaria	o	xo	xxx		1.72	

==== Group B ====
Place	Athlete	Nation	1.68	1.72	1.76	1.79	Mark	Notes
1	Izobelle Louison-Roe	Australia	–	–	o	o	1.79	q
1	Amairah Gayle	Canada	–	o	o	o	1.79	q
1	Ella Mikkola	Finland	–	–	–	o	1.79	q
1	Lilianna Bátori	Hungary	–	–	–	o	1.79	q
1	Pooja	India	–	–	o	o	1.79	q
1	Siun Quinn	Ireland	–	o	o	o	1.79	q
1	Natalija Vojinovic	Serbia	–	o	o	o	1.79	q
8	Nuppu Willman	Finland	o	o	o	xxo	1.79	q
8	Brianna Rivers	United States	o	o	o	xxo	1.79	q
10	Charlotte Sorin	France	o	o	xxx		1.72	
10	Carolin Evers	Germany	o	o	xxx		1.72	

=== Final ===
The final took place in the afternoon session on 9 August 2026.

Place	Athlete	Nation	1.75	1.80	1.84	1.87	1.90	1.92	1.94	Mark	Notes
1st place, gold medalist(s)	Izobelle Louison-Roe	Australia	o	o	o	o	o	o	xxx	1.92 m	
2nd place, silver medalist(s)	Lilianna Bátori	Hungary	-	o	xo	o	o	x-	xx	1.90 m	
3rd place, bronze medalist(s)	Aitana Alonso	Spain	o	o	o	o	xo	xxx		1.90 m	NU20R
4	Ella Mikkola	Finland	-	o	o	o	xxx			1.87 m	
4	Natalija Vojinovic	Serbia	o	o	o	o	xxx			1.87 m	PB
6	Siun Quinn	Ireland	o	o	xo	xo	xxx			1.87 m	PB
7	Pooja	India	o	o	xo	xxx				1.84 m	
8	Bailey Hensgens	United States	o	o	xxx					1.80 m	
9	Brianna Rivers	United States	o	xo	xxx					1.80 m	
9	Nuppu Willman	Finland	o	xo	xxx					1.80 m	
11	Olympia Tzouveli	Greece	o	xxo	xxx					1.80 m	
12	Amairah Gayle	Canada	o	xxx						1.75 m	
12	Marleen Ritari	Estonia	o	xxx						1.75 m	
14	Karina Niżyńska	Poland	xxo	xxx						1.75 m	
