= Athletics at the 2020 Summer Olympics – Women's high jump =

Women's high jump at the Games of the XXXII Olympiad
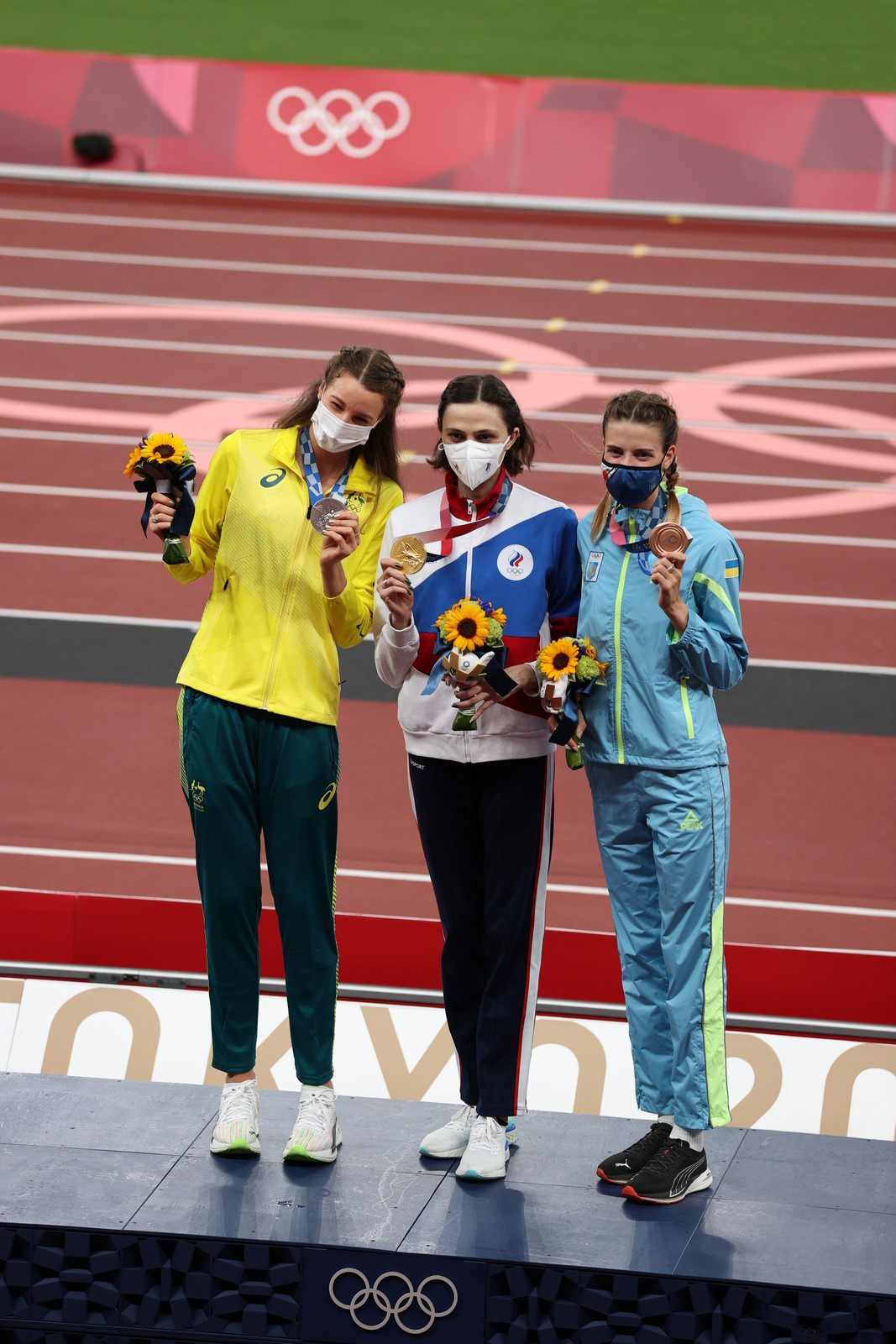
- Venue: Japan National Stadium
- Dates: 5 August 2021 (qualifying); 7 August 2021 (final)
- Competitors: 31 from 20 nations
- Winning height: 2.04 m

Medalists
1st place, gold medalist(s)		Mariya Lasitskene	ROC
2nd place, silver medalist(s)		Nicola McDermott	Australia
3rd place, bronze medalist(s)		Yaroslava Mahuchikh	Ukraine

Official Video Highlights

The women's high jump event at the 2020 Summer Olympics took place on 5 and 7 August 2021 at the Japan National Stadium. Even though 32 athletes qualified through the qualification system for the Games, only 31 took part in the competition. This was the 22nd appearance of the event, having appeared at every Olympics since women's athletics was introduced in 1928.

== Qualification ==
A National Olympic Committee (NOC) could enter up to three qualified athletes in the women's high jump event if all athletes meet the entry standard or qualify by ranking during the qualifying period; this limit of three has been in place since the 1930 Olympic Congress. The qualifying standard was 1.96 metres. This standard was "set for the sole purpose of qualifying athletes with exceptional performances unable to qualify through the IAAF World Rankings pathway." The world rankings, based on the average of the best five results for the athlete over the qualifying period and weighted by the importance of the meet, was then used to qualify athletes until the cap of 32 was reached.

The qualifying period was originally from 1 May 2019 to 29 June 2020. Due to the COVID-19 pandemic, the period was suspended from 6 April 2020 to 30 November 2020, with the end date extended to 29 June 2021; athletes who had met the qualifying standard during the suspension time were still qualified, but those using world rankings would not be able to count performances during that time. The qualifying height standards could be obtained in various meets during the given period that had the approval of World Athletics. Both outdoor and indoor meets were eligible. The most recent Area Championships could be counted in the ranking, even if they did not take place during the qualifying period.

NOCs could also use their universality place — each NOC can enter one female athlete regardless of marks if they had no female athletes meeting the entry standard for an athletics event — in the high jump.

== Competition format ==
The Tokyo 2020 competition continued to use the two-round format introduced in 1912. There are two distinct rounds of jumping with results cleared between rounds. Jumpers are eliminated if they have three consecutive failures, whether at a single height or between multiple heights if they attempt to advance before clearing a height.

The qualifying round has the bar set at various heights up to the qualifying standard, which in Tokyo 2020 was set at 1.95 metres. All jumpers clearing that standard advance to the final. A minimum of 12 jumpers advance; if fewer than 12 achieve the qualifying standard, the top 12 (including ties after use of the countback rules) advance.

The final has jumps starting typically just below the qualifying standard and increasing gradually. The final continues until all jumpers are eliminated.

== Summary ==
For the previous five years, Mariya Lasitskene, previously known as Mariya Kuchina, had been the best high jumper in the world. There are no reports of her personal involvement in the Russian doping program, but the scandal has resulted in her competing under three flags: Russia, Authorised Neutral Athletes, and ROC as well as under her married and maiden names. She has won three World Championships, but was barred from competing at the 2016 Olympics as part of a ban of Russia in athletics by the IAAF. 36 year old Ruth Beitia won in her absence. Beitia retired in 2017. Bronze medalist Blanka Vlašić also retired earlier in the season. Mirela Demireva was the only returning medalist in this field. 2019 World Championship silver medalist Yaroslava Mahuchikh, still a teenager, held the leading marks of 2021, 2.06m indoors and 2.03m outdoors. Next on both lists was World Championship bronze medalist Vashti Cunningham.

During qualifications at the 2020 Olympics, 14 women made 1.95m to automatically qualify for the final. In the final, all but two made 1.93m, and 9 were over 1.96m. Iryna Herashchenko and Eleanor Patterson had perfect rounds going. Lasitskene only made 1.96m on her last attempt. Nicola McDermott, the newest member of the 2 metres club, was the only jumper to clear 1.98m on her first attempt, putting her in the gold medal seat. Herashchenko took over silver position, making it on her second attempt, along with the still struggling Lasitskene. Mahuchikh made it on her last attempt to reduce the field to four. At 2 metres, McDermott, vocally encouraginging herself to "come on" before each jump, kept her hand on gold with a second first attempt clearance. Lasitskene and Mahuchikh made it on their second attempts to stand in a virtual tie for silver. When Herashchenko missed her third attempt, the medalists were set. The bar moved to 2.02m. After McDermott missed, Lasitskene cleared on her first attempt. Suddenly she was in gold position. Mahuchikh missed, then McDermott got over. Her clearance was a personal best, Australian national record, and Oceanic continental record. Having nothing to gain by clearing, Mahuchikh passed her remaining two attempts to 2.04m. All three missed their first attempt, and McDermott had a very narrow miss on her second. When Lasitskene cleared on her second attempt, it was a virtual nail in the coffin for the others. Mahuchikh took her final, all or nothing attempt to try to get silver, but she failed which secured bronze. McDermott could not get over on her final attempt and won silver. Lasitskene celebrated before the world photographic corps, holding a flag of her Olympic Committee.

== Records ==
Prior to this competition, the existing global and area records were as follows:

World record	Stefka Kostadinova (BUL)	2.09	Rome, Italy	30 August 1987
Olympic record	Yelena Slesarenko (RUS)	2.06	Athens, Greece	28 August 2004
World Leading	Yaroslava Mahuchikh (UKR)	2.06	Banská Bystrica, Slovakia	2 February 2021

Area	Height (m)	Athlete	Nation
Africa (records)	2.06	Hestrie Cloete	South Africa
Asia (records)	2.00	Nadezhda Dubovitskaya	Kazakhstan
Europe (records)	2.09 WR	Stefka Kostadinova	Bulgaria
North, Central America and Caribbean (records)	2.05	Chaunté Lowe	United States
Oceania (records)	2.01	Nicola McDermott	Australia
South America (records)	1.96	Solange Witteveen	Argentina

The following new Area (continental) records were set during this competition:

Area	Athlete	Height	Nation
Oceania (records)	Nicola McDermott	2.02	Australia

The following national records were set during this competition:

Country	Athlete	Round	Height	Notes
Australia	Nicola McDermott	Final	2.02	AR

== Schedule ==
All times are Japan Standard Time (UTC+9)

The women's high jump took place over two separate days.

Date	Time	Round
Thursday, 5 August 2021	9:00	Qualifying
Saturday, 7 August 2021	19:00	Final

== Results ==
=== Qualification ===
Qualification rule: Qualifying performance 1.95 (Q) or at least 12 best performers (q) advance to the final.

Rank	Group	Athlete	Nation	1.82	1.86	1.90	1.93	1.95	Height	Notes
1	A	Nicola McDermott	Australia	—	o	o	o	o	1.95	Q
1	B	Marija Vuković	Montenegro	o	o	o	o	o	1.95	Q
3	B	Yaroslava Mahuchikh	Ukraine	—	o	xo	o	o	1.95	Q
4	B	Marie-Laurence Jungfleisch	Germany	o	o	o	o	xo	1.95	Q, SB
4	B	Eleanor Patterson	Australia	—	o	o	o	xo	1.95	Q
4	A	Safina Sadullayeva	Uzbekistan	—	o	o	o	xo	1.95	Q
7	B	Morgan Lake	Great Britain	o	o	o	xo	xo	1.95	Q
8	B	Kamila Lićwinko	Poland	—	o	xo	xo	xo	1.95	Q, SB
9	A	Vashti Cunningham	United States	—	o	o	o	xxo	1.95	Q
9	B	Mariya Lasitskene	ROC	o	o	o	o	xxo	1.95	Q
11	A	Iryna Herashchenko	Ukraine	o	o	o	xo	xxo	1.95	Q
11	A	Yuliya Levchenko	Ukraine	o	o	o	xo	xxo	1.95	Q
11	A	Maja Nilsson	Sweden	o	o	xo	o	xxo	1.95	Q
14	A	Mirela Demireva	Bulgaria	xxo	o	xxo	xo	xxo	1.95	Q, SB
15	B	Erika Kinsey	Sweden	o	o	o	xxo	xxx	1.93	SB
16	A	Emily Borthwick	Great Britain	o	xo	o	xxo	xxx	1.93	=PB
16	B	Elena Vallortigara	Italy	o	o	xo	xxo	xxx	1.93	
18	A	Daniela Stanciu	Romania	o	o	o	xxx		1.90	
19	A	Karyna Demidik	Belarus	o	o	xo	xxx		1.90	
20	B	Svetlana Radzivil	Uzbekistan	o	o	xxo	xxx		1.90	
20	A	Alessia Trost	Italy	o	o	xxo	xxx		1.90	
22	A	Ella Junnila	Finland	o	o	xxx			1.86	
22	A	Salome Lang	Switzerland	o	o	xxx			1.86	
22	B	Levern Spencer	Saint Lucia	o	o	xxx			1.86	
25	B	Rachel McCoy	United States	o	xo	xxx			1.86	
25	A	Imke Onnen	Germany	o	xo	xxx			1.86	
25	B	Ana Šimić	Croatia	o	xo	xxx			1.86	
28	B	Nadezhda Dubovitskaya	Kazakhstan	o	xxo	xxx			1.86	
28	A	Kristina Ovchinnikova	Kazakhstan	o	xxo	xxx			1.86	
28	A	Airinė Palšytė	Lithuania	o	xxo	xxx			1.86	
31	B	Tynita Butts-Townsend	United States	xo	xxx				1.82	

=== Final ===
Rank	Athlete	Nation	1.84	1.89	1.93	1.96	1.98	2.00	2.02	2.04	Height	Notes
1st place, gold medalist(s)	Mariya Lasitskene	ROC	o	o	o	xxo	xo	xo	o	xo	2.04	SB
2nd place, silver medalist(s)	Nicola McDermott	Australia	—	o	o	xo	o	o	xo	xxx	2.02	AR
3rd place, bronze medalist(s)	Yaroslava Mahuchikh	Ukraine	—	o	o	xo	xxo	xo	x-	xx	2.00	
4	Iryna Herashchenko	Ukraine	o	o	o	o	xo	xxx			1.98	=SB
5	Eleanor Patterson	Australia	o	o	o	o	xxx				1.96	=SB
6	Vashti Cunningham	United States	o	o	o	xo	xx-	x			1.96	
6	Safina Sadullayeva	Uzbekistan	—	o	o	xo	xxx				1.96	=PB
8	Yuliya Levchenko	Ukraine	o	o	xo	xo	xx-	x			1.96	=SB
9	Marija Vuković	Montenegro	o	o	xo	xxo	xxx				1.96	
10	Marie-Laurence Jungfleisch	Germany	o	o	xo	xxx					1.93	
11	Kamila Lićwinko	Poland	o	o	xxo	xxx					1.93	
12	Mirela Demireva	Bulgaria	xo	o	xxo	xxx					1.93	
13	Maja Nilsson	Sweden	o	xxx							1.84	
	Morgan Lake	Great Britain									DNS	
