= Athletics at the 2010 South American Games – Women's high jump =

The Women's High Jump event at the 2010 South American Games was held on March 23 at 17:15.

== Medalists ==
Gold	Silver	Bronze
Valdileia Martins; Brazil	Lais da Silva; Brazil	Sara Muñoz; Colombia

== Records ==
Standing records prior to the 2010 South American Games
World record	Stefka Kostadinova	Bulgaria	2.09m	Rome, Italy	30 August 1987
World Leading	Lesyanis Mayor	Cuba	1.93m	Havana, Cuba	11 February 2010
South American record	Solange Witteveen	Argentina	1.96m	Oristano, Italy	8 September 1997
South American U23 record	Solange Witteveen	Argentina	1.96m	Oristano, Italy	8 September 1997

== Results ==
Results were published.

=== Final ===
Rank	Athlete	Nationality	Attempt										Best Result	Notes
Rank	Athlete	Nationality	1.55	1.60	1.65	1.68	1.71	1.74	1.77	1.80	1.83	1.85	Best Result	Notes
1st place, gold medalist(s)	Valdileia Martins	Brazil	–	–	o	o	xo	o	o	o	xxo	xxx	1.83	
2nd place, silver medalist(s)	Lais da Silva	Brazil	–	o	o	–	o	xo	xxo	xxx			1.77	
3rd place, bronze medalist(s)	Sara Muñoz	Colombia	–	–	o	–	o	xo	xxx				1.74	
4	Florencia Vergara	Chile	–	o	o	–	xo	xxx					1.71	
5	Gabriela Saravia	(Peru) Perú	–	o	xxx								1.60	

== See also ==
- 2010 South American Under-23 Championships in Athletics
