= Tatiana Gusin =

Greek high jumper (born 1994)

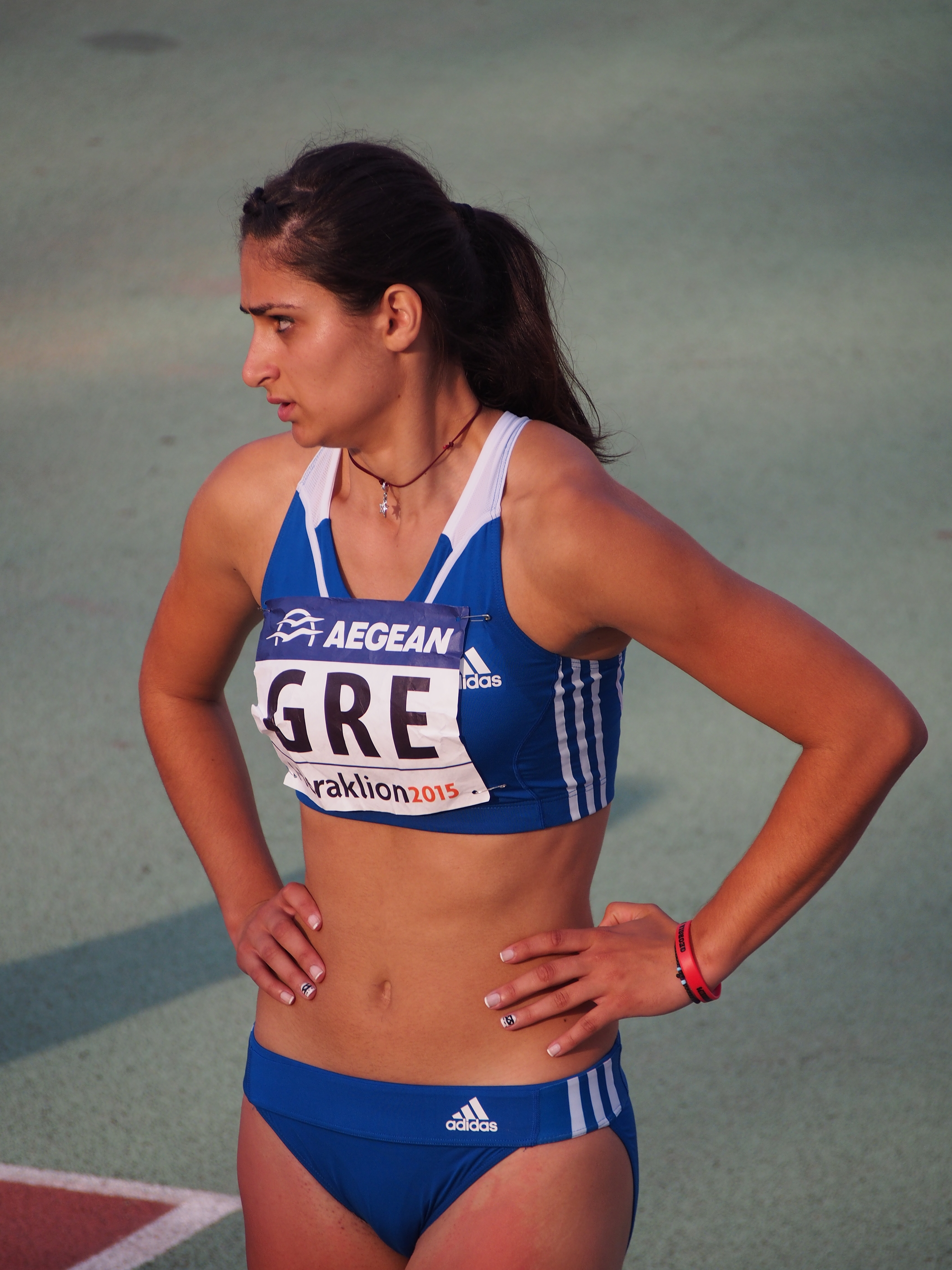
- Tatiana Gousin in the 2015 European Team Championships First League.

Personal information
- Nationality: Greek
- Born: 26 January 1994 (age 32) Orhei, Moldova

Sport
- Sport: Athletics
- Event: High jump

Achievements and titles
- Personal bests: 1.94 m 2024; 1.94 m (i) 2019

Tatiana Gusin (Greek: Τατιάνα Γκούσιν, [tatiana gusin], born 26 January 1994) is a Greek high jumper. She competed in the women's high jump at the 2017 World Championships in Athletics. She is of Moldovan ancestry. Her family arrived in Greece when she was 8.

Gusin competed for the Georgia Bulldogs track and field team in the NCAA.

== International competitions ==
Year	Competition	Venue	Position	Notes
Representing Greece
2017	World Championships	London, UK	26th (q)	1.85 m
2022	Mediterranean Games	Oran, Algeria	2nd	1.90 m SB
2022	World Championships	Eugene, United States	13th (q)	1.90 m =SB
2022	European Championships	Munich, Germany	9th	1.86 m
2023	World Championships	Budapest, Hungary	17th (q)	1.89 m
2024	World Indoor Championships	Glasgow, United Kingdom	7th	1.88 m
2024	European Championships	Rome, Italy	14th (q)	1.89 m
2024	Olympic Games	Paris, France	9th	1.86 m
2025	European Indoor Championships	Apeldoorn, Netherlands	11th (q)	1.85 m
2025	World Championships	Tokyo, Japan	25th (q)	1.83 m
