= Izobelle Louison-Roe =

Australian athlete (born 2007)

Personal information
- Nationality: Australian
- Born: 14 May 2007 (age 19)

Sport
- Sport: Athletics
- Events: High jump, Triple jump

Achievements and titles
- Personal bests: High jump: 1.95m (Canberra, 2026); Triple Jump: 13.36m (Brisbane, 2026) NU20R
Medal record
Women's athletics
Representing Australia
Oceania Championships
Gold medal – first place	2026 Darwin	High jump
Silver medal – second place	2026 Darwin	Triple jump
World U20 Championships
Gold medal – first place	2026 Eugene	High jump
Silver medal – second place	2024 Lima	High jump

Izobelle Louison-Roe (born 14 May 2007) is an Australian high jumper and triple jumper. She is the Gold medalist at the 2026 World Athletics U20 Championships. She was a silver medalist at the 2024 World Athletics U20 Championships in the high jump.

== Biography ==
In March 2023, she cleared 1.84 metres to finish second in the high jump at the Sydney Track Classic at the age of 15 years-old. She was a bronze medalist in the high jump at the 2023 Commonwealth Youth Games in Trinidad and Tobago.

In December 2023, at the Australian All Schools Championships in Perth, Australia she competed in the U17 100m hurdles, high jump, triple jump and long jump. She set a championship record for the triple jump with a 13.39m jump.

In August 2024, she won a silver medal at the 2024 World Athletics U20 Championships in Lima, Peru in the high jump with a personal best jump of 1.89 metres, finishing behind Angelina Topić but ahead of defending champion Karmen Bruus on countback.

In Canberra in January 2026, she cleared a personal best 1.95 metres to win the Capital Athletics Open and Under 20 Championships. The following month, she won the triple jump at the Perth Track Classic ahead of Desleigh Owusu, and the high jump at the Hobart Track Classic. In March, she equaled her high jump personal best of 1.95 metres at the Maurie Plant Meet to finish second to Nicola Olyslagers on count-back. The following month at the Australian U20 Championships, Louison-Roe jumped 13.36m (+1.0) to win the triple jump title and equal the Australia under-20 record, which was set by Linda Allen in 2006. Later at the championships, she won a second title with 1.93 m in the high jump. In May, she won the gold medal with 1.85 metres at the 2026 Oceania Athletics Championships in Darwin. Later at the championships, she also won a silver medal in the triple jump.

== Personal life ==
From New South Wales, she attended Kirrawee High School in Sydney. She is a member of St George Athletics Club.
