= Nawal Meniker =

French athlete

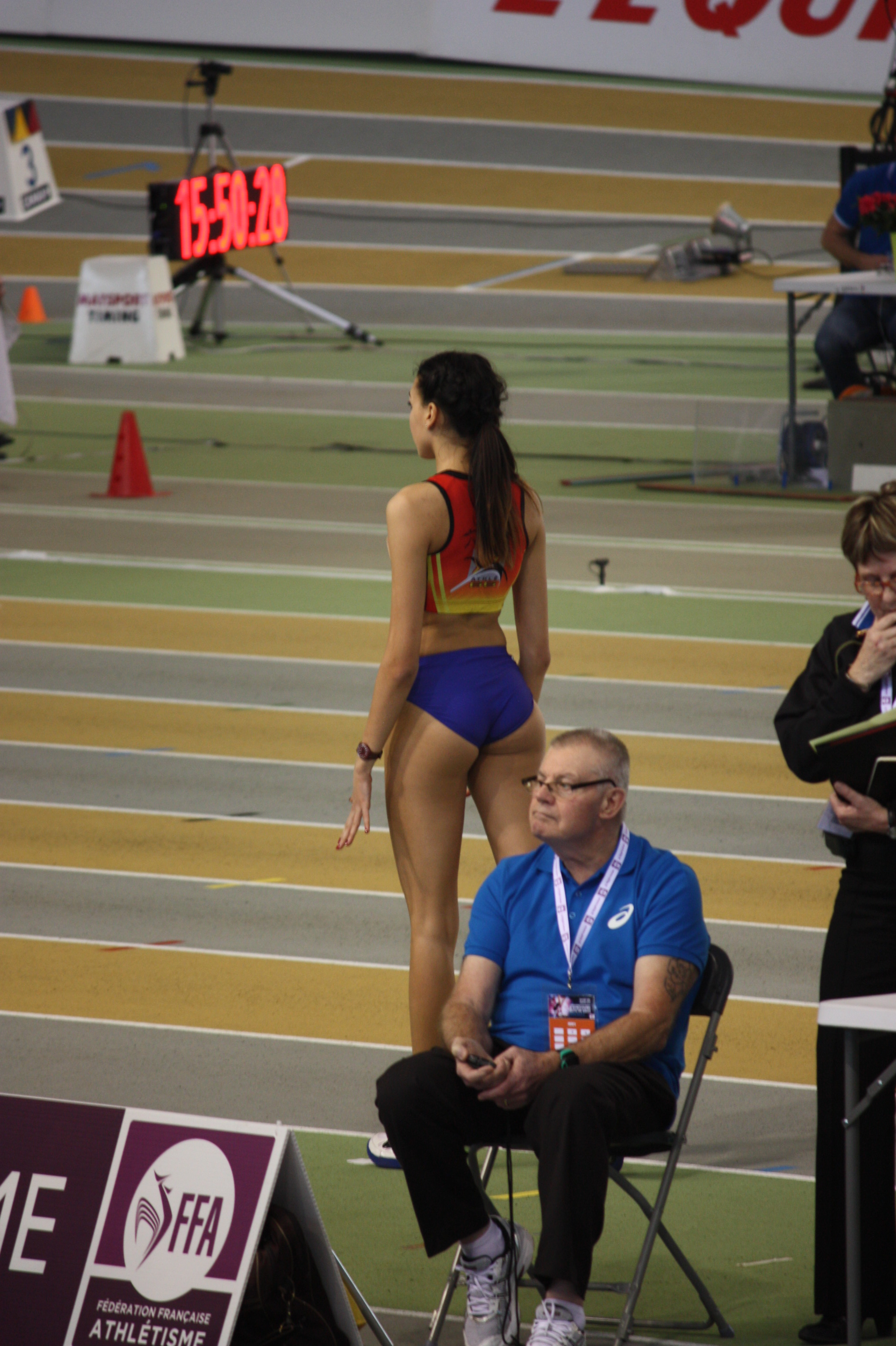
- Meniker in 2015

Personal information
- Born: 9 December 1997 (age 28) Perpignan, France
- Height: 178 cm (5 ft 10 in)
- Weight: 60 kg (132 lb)

Sport
- Country: France
- Sport: Athletics
- Event: High jump

Achievements and titles
- Personal bests: High jump: Outdoors 1.93m (Tucson, 2023); High jump: Indoors 1.92m (Aubiére, 2023)
Medal record
Women's athletics
Representing France
Youth Olympic Games
Silver medal – second place	2014 Nanjing	High jump
European Junior Championships
Silver medal – second place	2015 Eskilstuna	High jump

Nawal Meniker (born 9 December 1997) is a French track and field athlete who competes in the high jump.

== Career ==
She won the silver medal at the 2014 Summer Youth Olympics in Nanjing in 2014, behind Yuliya Levchenko. She won the silver medal behind Morgan Lake in Eskilstuna at the 2015 European Athletics Junior Championships.

She began to be coached by Mickaël Hanany, based in El Paso, Texas in 2022. Meniker cleared a personal best indoors height of 1.92m in Aubiére, in February 2023. She then cleared a height of 1.93 outdoors in Tucson, Arizona in April 2023.

She won high jump in Division I at the 2023 European Athletics Team Championships in Silesia in June 2023 with a clearance of 1.92 metres.

Making her World Championship debut in August 2023, she qualified for the high jump final at the 2023 World Athletics Championships in Budapest with a jump of 1.89 metres.

She competed in the high jump at the 2024 Paris Olympics, where she qualified for the final and placed eleventh overall.
