= Valdiléia Martins =

Brazilian athletics competitor

Valdileia Martins
Personal information
- Born: September 19, 1989 (age 36) Querência do Norte, Brazil

Sport
- Sport: Athletics
- Event: High jump
- Coached by: Dino Cintra

Achievements and titles
- Personal best: 1.92

Valdileia Martins (born 19 September 1989) is a Brazilian athlete who specialises in the high jump. She represented her country at the 2023 World Championships in Budapest without qualifying for the final. In addition, she has won multiple medals on regional level.

She became the second Brazilian in history to reach the mark of 1.90 m in the high jump, in the III CBAt/CPB Challenge, held in São Paulo, 2024. The Brazilian record of 1.92 m has been held by Orlane Maria Lima dos Santos since 1989 and was set in the altitude of Bogotá.

At the 2024 Summer Olympics, at the age of 34, she achieved the best result of her life by qualifying for the Olympic final, equaling the Brazilian record in the high jump. She achieved a mark of 1.92m, and also attempted 3 jumps at 1.95m in the qualifying round. In the second of the 3 attempts at 1.95m, she twisted her ankle and had 2 days to recover until the final.

Her personal bests in the event are 1.92 metres outdoors (Paris 2024) and 1.85 metres indoors (Cochabamba 2024).

== International competitions ==
Year	Competition	Venue	Position	Notes
Representing Brazil
2007	South American Junior Championships	São Paulo, Brazil	2nd	1.70 m
2007	Pan American Junior Championships	São Paulo, Brazil	8th	1.65 m
2010	South American Games	Guadalajara, Mexico	1st	1.83 m
2010	Ibero-American Championships	San Fernando, Spain	5th	1.80 m
2011	Pan American Games	Guadalajara, Mexico	5th	1.84 m
2016	Ibero-American Championships	Rio de Janeiro, Brazil	1st	1.84 m
2018	South American Games	Cochabamba, Bolivia	2nd	1.83 m
2019	South American Championships	Lima, Peru	2nd	1.84 m
2019	Pan American Games	Lima, Peru	5th	1.78 m
2020	South American Indoor Championships	Cochabamba, Bolivia	1st	1.82 m
2021	South American Championships	Guayaquil, Ecuador	2nd	1.86 m
2022	Ibero-American Championships	La Nucía, Spain	2nd	1.84 m
2022	South American Games	Asunción, Paraguay	1st	1.87 m
2023	South American Championships	São Paulo, Brazil	1st	1.84 m
2023	World Championships	Budapest, Hungary	27th (q)	1.85 m
2023	Pan American Games	Santiago, Chile	5th	1.78 m
2024	South American Indoor Championships	Cochabamba, Bolivia	1st	1.85 m
2024	Ibero-American Championships	Cuiabá, Brazil	1st	1.88 m
2024	Olympic Games	Paris, France	11th (q)	1.92 m^{1}
2025	South American Indoor Championships	Cochabamba, Bolivia	3rd	1.70 m
2025	South American Championships	Mar del Plata, Argentina	3rd	1.75 m
2026	Ibero-American Championships	Lima, Peru	6th	1.65 m

^{1}Did not set a mark in the final.
