= Ukraine at the 2023 World Athletics Championships =

- Flag of Ukraine
- WA code: UKR

in Budapest, Hungary 19 August 2023 – 27 August 2023
- Competitors: 29 (11 men and 18 women)
- Medals Ranked 14th: Gold 1 Silver 1 Bronze 0 Total 2

World Athletics Championships appearances
- 1993; 1995; 1997; 1999; 2001; 2003; 2005; 2007; 2009; 2011; 2013; 2015; 2017; 2019; 2022; 2023; 2025

Ukraine competed at the 2023 World Athletics Championships in Budapest, Hungary, from 19 to 27 August 2023. The country won two medals, one gold and one silver.

The best result for the Ukrainian men was Mykhaylo Kokhan's fifth place finish in the hammer throw. Andriy Protsenko, the 2022 World Championship bronze medalist in the men's high jump, finished 11th in the event this year.

Maryna Bekh-Romanchuk, the 2019 World Championship silver medalist in the women's long jump, did not mark in qualifications this time. In her other event, the triple jump, she won the silver medal with a mark of 15.00 m.

Ukraine had four athletes competing in the women's high jump event: Yuliya Chumachenko, Iryna Herashchenko, Yuliya Levchenko (2017 World Championship silver medalist), and Yaroslava Mahuchikh (2019 World Championship silver medalist, 2020 Summer Olympics bronze medalist, and 2022 World Championship silver medalist). Mahuchikh and Herashchenko both qualified for the final. In the final, Herashchenko had a mark of 1.94 m and finished tied for fifth. Mahuchikh was the only competitor to clear the bar at 2.01 m and won the gold medal.

== Medalists ==
| Medal | Athlete | Event | Date |
|---|---|---|---|
| Gold | Yaroslava Mahuchikh | Women's high jump | August 27 |
| Silver | Maryna Bekh-Romanchuk | Women's triple jump | August 25 |

== Results ==
Ukraine entered 29 athletes.

Key

- Q = Qualified for the next round
- q = Qualified for the next round as a fastest loser or, in field events, by position without achieving the qualifying target
- NR = National record
- PB = Personal best
- SB = Season best
- N/A = Round not applicable for the event

=== Men ===
Track and road events

| Athlete | Event | Heat | | Semifinal | | Final | |
| Athlete | Event | Result | Rank | Result | Rank | Result | Rank |
|---|---|---|---|---|---|---|---|
| Oleksandr Pohorilko | 400 metres | 45.37 | 5 | Did not advance | | | |
| Serhii Svitlychnyi | 20 kilometres walk | —N/a | | | | 1:22:28 SB | 28 |
| Ivan Banzeruk | 35 kilometres walk | —N/a | | | | DNF | |
| Ihor Hlavan | 35 kilometres walk | —N/a | | | | 2:45:18 | 33 |

Field events

| Athlete | Event | Qualification | | Final | |
| Athlete | Event | Distance | Position | Distance | Position |
|---|---|---|---|---|---|
| Oleh Doroshchuk | High jump | 2.28 =PB | 5 q | 2.20 | 13 |
| Dmytro Nikitin | High jump | 2.18 | =28 | Did not advance | |
| Andrii Protsenko | High jump | 2.28 | =6 q | 2.25 | 11 |
| Vladislav Malykhin | Pole vault | 5.35 | =26 | Did not advance | |
| Roman Kokoshko | Shot put | 19.17 | 29 | Did not advance | |
| Mykhaylo Kokhan | Hammer throw | 78.47 | 2 Q | 79.59 SB | 5 |
| Artur Felfner | Javelin throw | 73.94 | 32 | Did not advance | |

=== Women ===
Track and road events

| Athlete | Event | Heat | | Semifinal | | Final | |
| Athlete | Event | Result | Rank | Result | Rank | Result | Rank |
|---|---|---|---|---|---|---|---|
| Kateryna Karpiuk | 400 metres | 52.66 | 8 | Did not advance | | | |
| Nataliia Krol | 800 metres | 2:01.62 | 7 | Did not advance | | | |
| Olha Lyakhova | 800 metres | 2:03.11 | 6 | Did not advance | | | |
| Nataliya Strebkova | 3000 metres steeplechase | 10:02.20 | 12 | —N/a | | Did not advance | |
| Anna Ryzhykova | 400 metres hurdles | 54.70 | 3 Q | 54.42 SB | 4 | Did not advance | |
| Viktoriya Tkachuk | 400 metres hurdles | 55.05 | 2 Q | 55.43 | 7 | Did not advance | |
| Lyudmila Olyanovska | 20 kilometres walk | —N/a | | | | 1:29:36 SB | 11 |
| Hanna Shevchuk | 20 kilometres walk | —N/a | | | | 1:31:44 SB | 19 |
| Olena Sobchuk | 20 kilometres walk | —N/a | | | | 1:28:50 PB | 10 |
| Vasylyna Sydorchuk | 35 kilometres walk | —N/a | | | | 2:57:24 | 20 |
| Alina Tsvilii | 35 kilometres walk | —N/a | | | | 3:09:23 | 34 |

Field events

| Athlete | Event | Qualification | | Final | |
| Athlete | Event | Distance | Position | Distance | Position |
|---|---|---|---|---|---|
| Yuliya Chumachenko | High jump | 1.85 | =23 | Did not advance | |
| Iryna Herashchenko | High jump | 1.89 | =9 q | 1.94 | =5 |
| Yuliya Levchenko | High jump | 1.89 | =17 | Did not advance | |
| Yaroslava Mahuchikh | High jump | 1.92 | =1 q | 2.01 | 1st place, gold medalist(s) |
| Maryna Bekh-Romanchuk | Long jump | NM | | Did not advance | |
| Maryna Bekh-Romanchuk | Triple jump | 14.55 | 4 Q | 15.00 SB | 2nd place, silver medalist(s) |
| Mariya Siney | Triple jump | 13.38 | 32 | Did not advance | |
| Iryna Klymets | Hammer throw | 66.87 | 31 | Did not advance | |
