= Pooja Singh (athlete) =

Indian high jumper (born 2007)

Personal information
- Full name: Pooja Hansraj Singh
- Born: 21 February 2007 (age 19) Bosti, Haryana, India

Sport
- Sport: Athletics
- Event: High jump
- Coached by: Sahana Kumari

Achievements and titles
- Personal bests: 1.93 m NR NU20R (Hong Kong, 2026)
Medal record
Women's athletics
Representing India
Asian Games
Bronze medal – third place	2026 Aichi–Nagoya	High jump
Asian Championships
Gold medal – first place	2025 Gumi	High jump
Asian Indoor Championships
Silver medal – second place	2026 Tianjin	High jump
Asian U20 Championships
Gold medal – first place	2026 Hong Kong	High jump
Silver medal – second place	2023 Yecheon	High jump
South Asian U20 Championships
Gold medal – first place	2024 Chennai	High jump
Asian U18 Championships
Gold medal – first place	2023 Tashkent	High jump
Commonwealth Youth Games
Bronze medal – third place	2023 Port of Spain	High jump

Pooja Hansraj Singh (born 21 February 2007) is an Indian high jumper. She won the gold medal at the 2025 Asian Championships, silver at the 2026 Asian Indoor Championships and bronze at the 2026 Asian Games.

== Early life ==
Pooja hails from Bosti village in Fatehabad district of Haryana. Her father Hansraj is a construction worker. Her childhood coach spotted her during a yoga session and was impressed with her yoga postures, and recruited her as a high jumper. She did her practice jumps on village fields with bamboo poles and sacks of husk due to the financial hardships she faced at the start of her career. She did her Bachelor of Physical Education from Lovely Professional University. She is sponsored by the Olympic Gold Quest.

== Career ==
Pooja started her jumps under coach Balwan Singh Parta at a small facility in Haryana which had no landing mats. Her first competitive high jump event was a local meet where she cleared 90 cm. Soon after, she won her first gold medal in the U14 category with a jump of 1.41 m. In 2022, she won the gold medal at the Junior National Championships in Guwahati, setting a new U16 national record with a jump of 1.76 m.

She made her international debut at the 2023 Asian U18 Championships in Tashkent, where she won the gold medal with a jump of 1.77 m. She won a silver medal at the 2023 Asian U20 Championships in Yecheon, with a jump of 1.82 m. She finished seventh with a jump of 1.75 m at the 2023 Asian Championships in Bangkok. She won the bronze medal with a jump of 1.75 m at the 2023 Commonwealth Youth Games in Port of Spain. In October 2023, she finished sixth with a jump of 1.80 m at the Asian Games in Hangzhou.

At the 2024 World U20 Championships in Lima, she finished second in her group in the qualification round with a jump of 1.83 m, setting a U20 national record. She finished ninth in the final with a jump of 1.80 m. She won the gold medal at the 2024 South Asian U20 Championships in Chennai, with a jump of 1.80 m.

She claimed gold at the 2025 Asian Championships in Gumi, with a season best jump of 1.89 m, breaking her own U20 national record. Later in the season, she suffered a grade-2 ligament tear which ruled her out of the 2025 World University Games.

She won the silver medal at the 2026 Asian Indoor Championships in Tianjin, with a jump of 1.87 m, becoming the first Indian woman to win a high jump medal at the championships. At the 2026 Asian U20 Championships in Hong Kong, she won the gold medal with a jump of 1.93 m, setting a championship record and surpassing the previous senior national record of 1.92 m set by her coach Sahana Kumari in 2012. At the 2026 Commonwealth Games in Glasgow, she finished eighth with a jump of 1.77 m. She finished seventh at the 2026 World U20 Championships in Eugene, with a jump of 1.84 m. At the 2026 Aisan Games in Nagoya, she won the bronze medal with a jump of 1.84 m.

== International competitions ==
Representing India
Year	Competition	Host	Position	Result
2023	Asian U18 Championships	Tashkent, Uzbekistan	1st	1.77 m
2023	Asian U20 Championships	Yecheon, South Korea	2nd	1.82 m
2023	Asian Championships	Bangkok, Thailand	7th	1.75 m
2023	Commonwealth Youth Games	Port of Spain, Trinidad & Tabago	3rd	1.75 m
2023	Asian Games	Hangzhou, China	6th	1.80 m
2024	World U20 Championships	Lima, Peru	9th	1.80 m
2024	South Asian U20 Championships	Chennai, India	1st	1.80 m
2025	Asian Championships	Gumi, South Korea	1st	1.89 m
2026	Asian Indoor Championships	Tianjin, China	2nd	1.87 m
2026	Asian U20 Championships	Hong Kong, China	1st	1.93 m
2026	Commonwealth Games	Glasgow, Scotland	8th	1.77 m
2026	World U20 Championships	Eugene, U.S.	7th	1.84 m
2026	Asian Games	Nagoya, Japan	3rd	1.84 m
