= 2022 World Athletics Championships – Women's high jump =

Women's high jump at the 2022 World Championships
- Venue: Hayward Field
- Dates: 16 July (qualification); 19 July (final)
- Competitors: 31 from 19 nations
- Winning height: 2.02

Medalists
gold medal	Eleanor Patterson	Australia
silver medal	Yaroslava Mahuchikh	Ukraine
bronze medal	Elena Vallortigara	Italy

The women's high jump at the 2022 World Athletics Championships was held at the Hayward Field in Eugene on 16 and 19 July 2022.

== Summary ==
All twelve finalists cleared 1.89m, ten over 1.93m and eight over 1.96m. Iryna Herashchenko, Yaroslava Mahuchikh, Elena Vallortigara and Eleanor Patterson all made 1.98m. Patterson took three attempts to make her clearance while Mahuchikh and Vallortigara were tied for the lead with perfect rounds going. At 2 metres, Vallortigara remained perfect, while the other three made it on their second attempts. At 2.02 m (6 ft 7 1/2 in), Mahuchikh and Herashchenko missed, then Patterson succeeded on her first attempt to tie her National and continental record. When Vallortigara also missed, Patterson moved into first place. Mahuchikh made it on her second attempt, while the others failed. Neither Mahuchikh or Patterson could make 2.04m. Patterson was confirmed as the gold medalist, Mahuchikh silver and Vallortigara bronze.

== Records ==
Before the competition records were as follows:

Record	Athlete & Nat.	Perf.	Location	Date
World record	Stefka Kostadinova (BUL)	2.09 m	Rome, Italy	30 August 1987
Championship record	Stefka Kostadinova (BUL)	2.09 m	Rome, Italy	30 August 1987
World Leading	Yaroslava Mahuchikh (UKR)	2.03 m	Brno, Czech Republic	22 June 2022
African Record	Hestrie Cloete (RSA)	2.06 m	Saint-Denis, France	31 August 2003
Asian Record	Nadezhda Dubovitskaya (KAZ)	2.00 m	Almaty, Kazakhstan	8 June 2021
North, Central American and Caribbean record	Chaunte Lowe (USA)	2.05 m	Des Moines, United States	26 June 2010
South American Record	Solange Witteveen (ARG)	1.96 m	Oristano, Italy	8 September 1997
European Record	Stefka Kostadinova (BUL)	2.09 m	Rome, Italy	30 August 1987
Oceanian record	Nicola McDermott (AUS)	2.02 m	Tokyo, Japan	7 August 2021

== Qualification standard ==
The standard to qualify automatically for entry was 1.96 m.

== Schedule ==
The event schedule, in local time (UTC−7), was as follows:

Date	Time	Round
16 July	11:10	Qualification
19 July	17:40	Final

== Results ==
=== Qualification ===
Qualification: 1.95 m (Q) or at least 12 best performers (q).

Rank	Group	Name	Nationality	1.75	1.81	1.86	1.90	1.93	1.95	Mark	Notes
1	A	Eleanor Patterson	Australia	–	o	o	o	o		1.93	q
1	A	Elena Vallortigara	Italy	–	o	o	o	o		1.93	q
1	A	Iryna Herashchenko	Ukraine	–	o	o	o	o		1.93	q
1	A	Safina Sadullayeva	Uzbekistan	–	–	o	o	o		1.93	q, SB
1	B	Yaroslava Mahuchikh	Ukraine	–	–	o	o	o		1.93	q
6	B	Daniela Stanciu	Romania	o	o	o	o	xo		1.93	q, SB
6	B	Karmen Bruus	Estonia	o	o	o	o	xo		1.93	q, PB
8	B	Nadezhda Dubovitskaya	Kazakhstan	–	o	xo	xo	xo		1.93	q
9	B	Nicola Olyslagers	Australia	–	–	o	xo	xxo		1.93	q
10	A	Lamara Distin	Jamaica	–	o	o	o	xxx		1.90	q
10	B	Kimberly Williamson	Jamaica	o	o	o	o	xxx		1.90	q
10	B	Lia Apostolovski	Slovenia	o	o	o	o	xxx		1.90	q
13	B	Tatiana Gusin	Greece	–	xo	xo	o	xxx		1.90	SB
14	B	Marija Vuković	Montenegro	–	o	o	xo	xxx		1.90	
15	A	Maja Nilsson	Sweden	o	o	o	xxo	xxx		1.90	
15	A	Yuliya Levchenko	Ukraine	–	o	o	xxo	xxx		1.90	
17	A	Rachel McCoy	United States	o	xo	xo	xxo	xxx		1.90	SB
18	B	Ella Junnila	Finland	–	o	o	xxx			1.86	
18	B	Vashti Cunningham	United States	–	–	o	xxx			1.86	
20	A	Kristina Ovchinnikova	Kazakhstan	xo	o	o	xxx			1.86	
21	A	Marie-Laurence Jungfleisch	Germany	o	o	xo	xxx			1.86	SB
21	A	Sini Lällä	Finland	o	o	xo	xxx			1.86	
21	A	Urtė Baikštytė	Lithuania	o	o	xo	xxx			1.86	
21	B	Heta Tuuri	Finland	o	o	xo	xxx			1.86	
25	B	Emily Borthwick	Great Britain & N.I.	o	xo	xxx				1.81	
25	B	Rachel Glenn	United States	–	xo	xxx				1.81	
27	A	Laura Zialor	Great Britain & N.I.	xo	xo	xxx				1.81	
28	A	Lu Jiawen	China	o	xxx					1.75	
28	B	Jennifer Rodríguez	Colombia	o	xxx					1.75	
	A	Morgan Lake	Great Britain & N.I.								DNS

=== Final ===
The final took place on 19 July at 17:40.

Rank	Name	Nationality	1.84	1.89	1.93	1.96	1.98	2.00	2.02	2.04	Mark	Notes
1st place, gold medalist(s)	Eleanor Patterson	Australia	o	o	o	o	xxo	xo	o	xxx	2.02	=AR
2nd place, silver medalist(s)	Yaroslava Mahuchikh	Ukraine	–	o	o	o	o	xo	xo	xxx	2.02	
3rd place, bronze medalist(s)	Elena Vallortigara	Italy	o	o	o	o	o	o	xxx		2.00	SB
4	Iryna Herashchenko	Ukraine	o	o	o	xo	o	xo	xxx		2.00	PB
5	Safina Sadullayeva	Uzbekistan	–	o	o	o	x-	xx			1.96	PB
5	Nicola Olyslagers	Australia	o	o	o	o	xxx				1.96	SB
7	Karmen Bruus	Estonia	o	xo	xo	xo	xxx				1.96	=NR, =WU18B
8	Nadezhda Dubovitskaya	Kazakhstan	o	xxo	xxo	xo	xxx				1.96	
9	Lamara Distin	Jamaica	o	o	o	xxx					1.93	
10	Daniela Stanciu	Romania	xo	o	xxo	xxx					1.93	SB
11	Kimberly Williamson	Jamaica	o	o	xxx						1.89	
12	Lia Apostolovski	Slovenia	o	xo	xxx						1.89	
