= Montenegro at the 2022 World Athletics Championships =

- Flag of Montenegro
- WA code: MNE

in Eugene, United States 15 July 2022 – 24 July 2022
- Competitors: 1 (1 woman)
- Medals: Gold 0 Silver 0 Bronze 0 Total 0

World Athletics Championships appearances
- 2007; 2009; 2011; 2013; 2015; 2017; 2019; 2022; 2023; 2025

Other related appearances
- Yugoslavia (1983–1991); Serbia and Montenegro (1998–2005)

Montenegro competed at the 2022 World Athletics Championships in Eugene, Oregon, United States, from 15 to 24 July 2022.

== Results ==
Montenegro's sole competitor, Marija Vuković, competed in the high jump event, but she did not qualify for the final round.

Key

- Q = Qualified for the next round
- q = Qualified for the next round as a fastest loser or, in field events, by position without achieving the qualifying target
- NR = National record
- PB = Personal best
- SB = Season best
- N/A = Round not applicable for the event

=== Women ===
Field events

Athlete	Event	Qualification		Final	
Athlete	Event	Distance	Position	Distance	Position
Marija Vuković	High jump	1.90	14	Did not advance	
