= Yelizaveta Matveyeva =

Kazakhstani athlete (born 2001)

Personal information
- Born: 9 December 2001 (age 24) Ust-Kamenogorsk, Kazakhstan
- Height: 1.88 m (6 ft 2 in)

Sport
- Sport: Athletics
- Event: High jump

Achievements and titles
- Personal bests: High jump: 1.92m (Almaty, 2022)
Medal record
Women's athletics
Representing Kazakhstan
Asian Championships
Silver medal – second place	2023 Bangkok	High jump
Asian Indoor Championships
Gold medal – first place	2024 Tehran	High jump
Bronze medal – third place	2023 Astana	High jump

Yelizaveta Matveyeva (born 9 December 2001) is a high jumper from Kazakhstan.

== Career ==
=== 2022 ===
She became Kazakhstan national champion in the high jump in Almaty in 2022 with a height of 1.88 metres. She set a personal best clearance of 1.92 metres at the XXXII Qosanov Memorial in Almaty on 25 June 2022.

=== 2023 ===
She was a bronze medalist at the 2023 Asian Indoor Athletics Championships in Astana with a clearance of 1.85 metres, as her country clinched a clean-sweep of the medals. She was a silver medalist at the 2023 Asian Athletics Championships in Bangkok, missing gold on count back after clearing the same 1.86m height as compatriot Kristina Ovchinnikova. She was selected to make her global competition debut at the 2023 World Athletics Championships in Budapest, but did not qualify for the final.

=== 2024 ===
In February 2024, she won the Kazhakstan national indoor title in Astana with a clearance of 1.88 metres. She was a gold medalist in the high jump at the 2024 Asian Indoor Athletics Championships in Tehran. She competed in the high jump at the 2024 Paris Olympics.

== Personal life ==
She graduated from The Kazakh-American Free University in Almaty where she studied Physical Culture and Sports.
