= Ilija Ranitović =

Montenegrin middle-distance runner

Personal information
- Born: February 6, 1987 (age 39) Bar, SFR Yugoslavia

Sport
- Country: Montenegro
- Sport: Track
- Event: 800 metres

Achievements and titles
- Personal best: 800 metres: 1:52.22

Ilija Ranitović (Serbian Cyrillic: Илија Ранитовић; born 6 February 1987) is a Montenegrin former middle-distance track runner. He represented Montenegro at the 2009 World Championships in Athletics and 2009 Mediterranean Games. Ranitović is a Montenegrin national record-holder for various sprint relay and indoor disciplines.

== Running career ==
Ranitović took up middle-distance track running with athletics club AK Mornar Bar. In 2009, Ranitović had the best season in his career, first running the 800 metres at the 2009 Mediterranean Games in a time of 1:52.62. Ranitović was one of only two athletes selected by Montenegro to compete at the 2009 World Championships in Athletics, and he ended up recording a time of 1:53.17 in the second heat of the 800 metre race.
