= 2023 World Athletics Championships – Women's high jump =

Women's high jump at the 2023 World Championships
- Venue: National Athletics Centre
- Dates: 25 August (qualification); 27 August (final)
- Winning height: 2.01 m

Medalists
gold medal	Yaroslava Mahuchikh	Ukraine
silver medal	Eleanor Patterson	Australia
bronze medal	Nicola Olyslagers	Australia

The women's high jump at the 2023 World Athletics Championships was held at the National Athletics Centre in Budapest on 25 and 27 August 2023.

== Summary ==
In the qualifying round, 19 women cleared 1.89m. That was too many to take to the final, so they went up to 1.92m. Only eight were able to clear 1.92m, so they counted back to the next tie-breaker at 1.89m, with a clean round and one miss at 1.89m being the difference. Had they not cleared 1.92m, two women would not have been in the final. Still, 15 advanced.

In the final, eight managed to clear 1.94m. Defending champion Eleanor Patterson, Lamara Distin, and Iryna Gerashchenko still had a clean card. At 1.97m, returning silver medalist Yaroslava Mahuchikh and 2023 world leader Nicola Olyslagers cleared on their first attempts to move into a tie for the lead. Patterson and Morgan Lake took all three attempts to get over, with Patterson holding the advantage based on her previous perfect series. At 1.99m, Patterson and Mahuchikh got over on their first attempts, with Mahuchikh holding the advantage. Lake missed her second. When Olyslagers made her second, Lake passed to try to make one heroic jump at 2.01m. She didn't make it and was out of the medals. Mahuchikh was able to make 2.01 on her second attempt to confirm her gold, while neither of the Australian women could, meaning that Patterson won silver and Olyslagers won bronze. Mahuchikh went on to make three attempts at a new Ukrainian record of 2.07m.

== Records ==
Before the competition, records were as follows:

Record	Athlete & Nat.	Perf.	Location	Date
World record	Stefka Kostadinova (BUL)	2.09 m	Rome, Italy	30 August 1987
Championship record	Stefka Kostadinova (BUL)	2.09 m	Rome, Italy	30 August 1987
World Leading	Nicola Olyslagers (AUS)	2.02 m	Lausanne, Switzerland	29 June 2023
African Record	Hestrie Cloete (RSA)	2.06 m	Saint-Denis, France	31 August 2003
Asian Record	Nadezhda Dubovitskaya (KAZ)	2.00 m	Almaty, Kazakhstan	8 June 2021
North, Central American and Caribbean record	Chaunte Lowe (USA)	2.05 m	Des Moines, United States	26 June 2010
South American Record	Solange Witteveen (ARG)	1.96 m	Oristano, Italy	8 September 1997
European Record	Stefka Kostadinova (BUL)	2.09 m	Rome, Italy	30 August 1987
Oceanian record	Nicola Olyslagers (AUS)	2.02 m	Lausanne, Switzerland	29 June 2023

== Qualification standard ==
The standard to qualify automatically for entry was 1.97 m.

== Schedule ==
The event schedule, in local time (UTC+2), was as follows:

Date	Time	Round
25 August	10:20	Qualification
27 August	20:05	Final

== Results ==
=== Qualification ===
Qualification: 1.94 m (Q) or at least 12 best performers (q).

Rank	Group	Name	Nationality	1.75	1.80	1.85	1.89	1.92	1.94	Mark	Notes
1	A	Eleanor Patterson	Australia	–	–	o	o	o		1.92	q
1	A	Yaroslava Mahuchikh	Ukraine	–	–	–	o	o		1.92	q
3	A	Lamara Distin	Jamaica	–	o	o	xo	o		1.92	q
4	A	Morgan Lake	Great Britain & N.I.	–	–	xxo	o	o		1.92	q
5	B	Vashti Cunningham	United States	–	o	xo	xxo	o		1.92	q
6	B	Nicola Olyslagers	Australia	–	–	o	o	xo		1.92	q
7	A	Angelina Topić	Serbia	–	o	o	o	xxo		1.92	q
8	A	Elena Kulichenko	Cyprus	o	o	xo	xxo	xxo		1.92	q, PB
9	B	Iryna Herashchenko	Ukraine	–	o	o	o	xxx		1.89	q
9	B	Lia Apostolovski	Slovenia	–	o	o	o	xxx		1.89	q
11	B	Nadezhda Dubovitskaya	Kazakhstan	–	xo	o	o	xxx		1.89	q
12	B	Christina Honsel	Germany	o	o	o	xo	xxx		1.89	q
12	B	Solène Gicquel	France	o	o	o	xo	xxx		1.89	q
12	A	Ella Junnila	Finland	–	o	o	xo	xxx		1.89	q
12	A	Nawal Meniker	France	–	o	o	xo	xxx		1.89	q
16	B	Elisabeth Pihela	Estonia	–	o	xo	xo	xxx		1.89	
17	B	Merel Maes	Belgium	o	o	o	xxo	xxx		1.89	
17	B	Tatiana Gusin	Greece	o	o	o	xxo	xxx		1.89	
17	A	Yuliya Levchenko	Ukraine	–	o	o	xxo	xxx		1.89	
20	A	Airinė Palšytė	Lithuania	o	o	o	xxx			1.85	
20	B	Daniela Stanciu	Romania	–	o	o	xxx			1.85	
20	B	Michaela Hrubá	Czech Republic	o	o	o	xxx			1.85	
23	A	Johanna Göring	Germany	o	o	xo	xxx			1.85	
23	B	Yuliya Chumachenko	Ukraine	–	o	xo	xxx			1.85	
25	A	Kristina Ovchinnikova	Kazakhstan	o	xo	xo	xxx			1.85	
25	B	Marija Vuković	Montenegro	–	xo	xo	xxx			1.85	
27	A	Valdileia Martins	Brazil	o	o	xxo	xxx			1.85	
28	B	Kimberly Williamson	Jamaica	xo	xxo	xxo	xxx			1.85	
29	A	Erin Shaw	Australia	o	o	xxx				1.80	
29	B	Safina Sadullayeva	Uzbekistan	–	o	xxx				1.80	
29	B	Yelizaveta Matveyeva	Kazakhstan	o	o	xxx				1.80	
32	B	Heta Tuuri	Finland	xo	o	xxx				1.80	
33	A	Fédra Fekete	Hungary	o	xo	xxx				1.80	
34	A	Panagiota Dosi	Greece	o	xxo	xxx				1.80	
–	A	Jana Koščak	Croatia								DNS

=== Final ===
The final was started on 27 August at 20:00.

Rank	Name	Nationality	1.85	1.90	1.94	1.97	1.99	2.01	2.07	Mark	Notes
1st place, gold medalist(s)	Yaroslava Mahuchikh	Ukraine	–	o	xo	o	o	xo	xxx	2.01	
2nd place, silver medalist(s)	Eleanor Patterson	Australia	o	o	o	xxo	o	xxx		1.99	SB
3rd place, bronze medalist(s)	Nicola Olyslagers	Australia	–	o	xo	o	xo	xxx		1.99	
4	Morgan Lake	Great Britain & N.I.	o	o	xxo	xxo	xx-	x		1.97	
5	Lamara Distin	Jamaica	o	o	o	xxx				1.94	
5	Iryna Herashchenko	Ukraine	o	o	o	xxx				1.94	
7	Angelina Topić	Serbia	o	o	xo	xxx				1.94	
8	Christina Honsel	Germany	o	xxo	xo	xxx				1.94	
9	Lia Apostolovski	Slovenia	o	o	xxx					1.90	SB
9	Nadezhda Dubovitskaya	Kazakhstan	o	o	xxx					1.90	
11	Vashti Cunningham	United States	xxo	o	xxx					1.90	
12	Nawal Meniker	France	o	xo	xxx					1.90	
13	Ella Junnila	Finland	o	xxo	xxx					1.90	
13	Elena Kulichenko	Cyprus	o	xxo	xxx					1.90	
15	Solène Gicquel	France	xo	xxx						1.85	
