= Safina Sadullayeva =

Uzbek high jumper

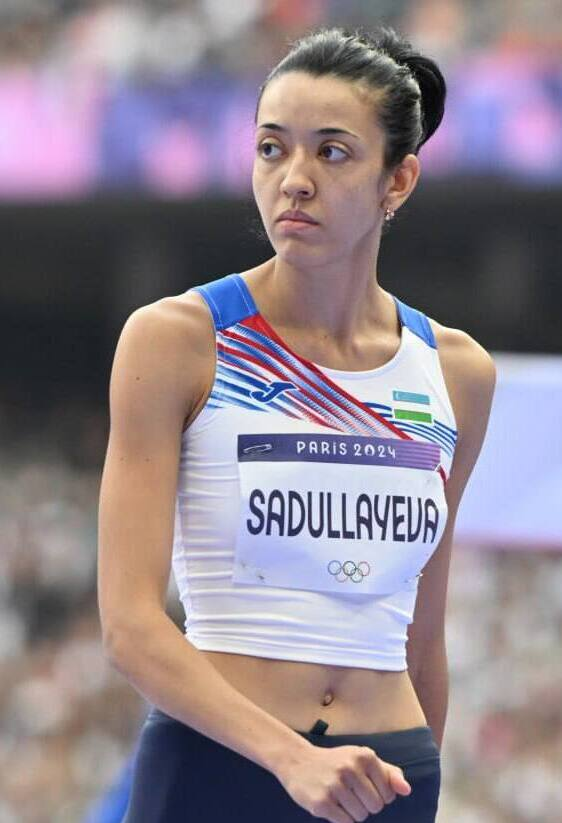
- Sadullayeva at the 2024 Summer Olympics

Personal information
- Nationality: Uzbekistani
- Born: 4 March 1998 (age 28)

Sport
- Sport: Athletics
- Event: High jump

Safina Erkinovna Sadullayeva (born 4 March 1998) is an Uzbek athlete. She competed in the Athletics at the 2020 – women's high jump event at the 2020 Summer Olympics

At the 2022 World Indoor Championships in Belgrade (Serbia), she took sixth place with a score of 192 cm.

At the 2022 World Athletics Championships in Oregon (United States), she took fifth place with a repetition of a personal best (196 cm). Sadullayeva became the best among all Asian jumpers.

== International competitions ==
Year	Competition	Venue	Position	Notes
Representing Uzbekistan
2015	Asian Youth Championships	Doha, Qatar	1st	1.74 m
2016	Asian Junior Championships	Ho Chi Minh City, Vietnam	6th	1.68 m
2017	Asian Indoor and Martial Arts Games	Ashgabat, Turkmenistan	2nd	1.83 m
2018	Asian Indoor Championships	Tehran, Iran	4th	1.75 m
2021	Olympic Games	Tokyo, Japan	6th	1.96 m
2022	World Indoor Championships	Belgrade, Serbia	6th	1.92 m
2022	World Championships	Eugene, United States	5th	1.96 m
2022	Islamic Solidarity Games	Konya, Turkey	1st	1.97 m
2023	World Championships	Budapest, Hungary	29th (q)	1.80 m
2023	Asian Games	Hangzhou, China	1st	1.86 m
2024	Olympic Games	Paris, France	7th	1.95 m
2025	Asian Championships	Gumi, South Korea	2nd	1.86 m
