= Vashti Cunningham =

American high jumper

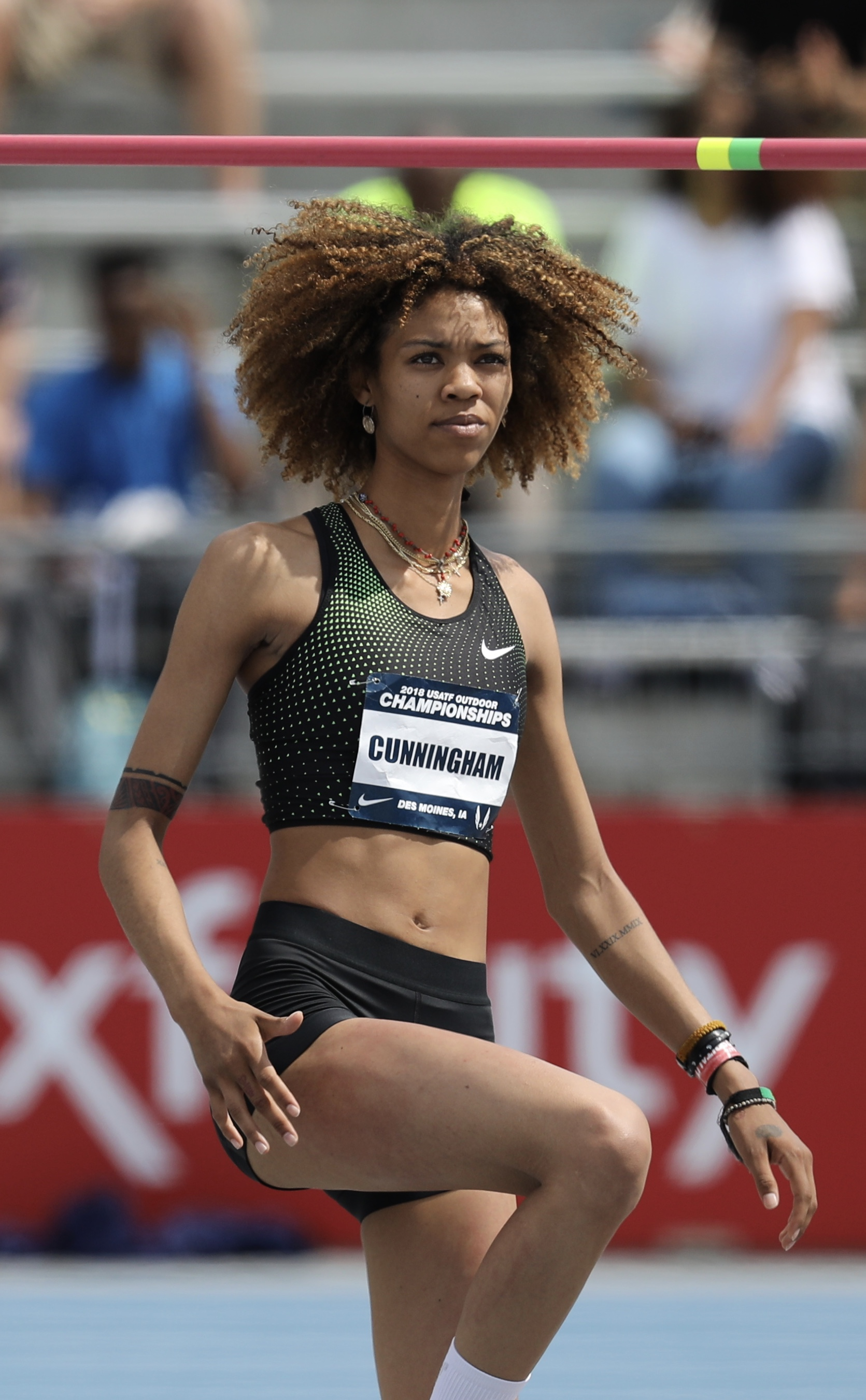
- Cunningham at the 2018 USA Outdoor Track and Field Championships

Personal information
- Born: January 18, 1998 (age 28) Las Vegas, Nevada, U.S.
- Height: 6 ft 1 in (1.86 m)
- Weight: 121 lb (55 kg)

Sport
- Sport: Track and field
- Event: High jump
- Club: Nike
- Turned pro: 2016

Achievements and titles
- Personal bests: High jump outdoor: 2.02 m (6 ft 7 1/2 in) (Chula Vista 2021); High jump indoor: 2.00 m (6 ft 6 1/2 in) (Fayetteville 2021)
Medal record
Women's athletics
Representing the United States
World Championships
Bronze medal – third place	2019 Doha	High jump
World Indoor Championships
Gold medal – first place	2016 Portland	High jump
Silver medal – second place	2018 Birmingham	High jump
NACAC Championships
Gold medal – first place	2025 Freeport	High jump
Pan American Junior Championships
Gold medal – first place	2015 Edmonton	High jump

Vashti Cunningham (born January 18, 1998) is an American track and field athlete specializing in the high jump. She is the daughter of retired National Football League (NFL) quarterback Randall Cunningham, niece of retired NFL fullback Sam Cunningham, and the younger sister of Randall Cunningham II. Her mother is Felicity de Jager Cunningham, a former ballerina with the Dance Theatre of Harlem. Vashti, like her brother two years ahead of her in school, jumped for Bishop Gorman High School in Las Vegas, Nevada until March 2016 when she signed with Nike. She announced at that time she intended to continue her education at a university while competing as a professional athlete.

== Jumping career ==
On April 18, 2015, at the Mt. SAC Relays in Walnut, California, Cunningham jumped 1.94 m (6 ft 4 1/4 in), to set the new national high school record. At age 17, that was also equal to the No. 4 world Youth mark (under 19 years old). At that date it was the No. 3 mark in the world in 2015. She was named USATF Athlete of the Week for that performance. On June 27, 2015, she won the U.S. Junior National Championship. A month later at the 2015 Pan American Junior Athletics Championships, she improved again, jumping 1.96 m (6 ft 5 in). That mark equaled the World Youth Best.

On March 12, 2016, Vashti jumped 1.99 m (6 ft 6 1/4 in) while winning the 2016 USA Indoor Track and Field Championships in Portland, Oregon. The mark established a new World Junior Record. At the time, just one week before the 2016 IAAF World Indoor Championships, which were held in the same facility in the Portland convention center, Cunningham's jump was the No. 1 jump in the world in 2016. Eight days later, she won the World Indoor Championship.

In March 2017, Cunningham jumped 1.96 m (6 ft 5 in) to win at 2017 USA Indoor Track and Field Championships. On April 15, 2017, Cunningham jumped 1.94 m (6 ft 4 1/4 in) to win in Torrance, California at Mt. SAC Relays, two weeks later she jumped 1.95 m (6 ft 4 3/4 in) to win at Penn Relays. Cunningham jumped 1.95 m (6 ft 4 3/4 in) to place 3rd behind World Champion Mariya Lasitskene on May 27 in Eugene at IAAF Diamond League 2017 Prefontaine Classic. On June 23, Cunningham jumped 1.99 m (6 ft 6 1/4 in) to win in 2017 USA Outdoor Track and Field Championships at Sacramento State University. On July 9, 2017, Cunningham jumped 1.97 m (6 ft 5 1/2 in) to place 2nd at London Müller Anniversary Games. On July 21, 2017, Cunningham jumped 1.97 m (6 ft 5 1/2 in) to place 3rd at IAAF Diamond League 2017 Herculis in Fontvieille, Monaco. On August 12, 2017, Cunningham jumped 1.92 m (6 ft 3 1/2 in) to place 10th at World Championships.

On February 18, 2018, Cunningham jumped 1.97 m (6 ft 5 1/2 in) to win third consecutive high jump indoor title and 4th US senior title at 2018 USA Indoor Track and Field Championships in Albuquerque, New Mexico. On March 1, Cunningham jumped 1.93 m (6 ft 3 3/4 in) to place second behind World Champion Mariya Lasitskene in high jump at 2018 IAAF World Indoor Championships in Birmingham, United Kingdom.

On July 7, 2023, Vashti Cunningham claimed her 13th U.S. high jump title with a victory at the U.S. outdoor track and field championships in Eugene, Oregon.

== Competition record ==
Year	Competition	Venue	Position	Notes
Representing the United States
2015	Pan American Junior Championships	Edmonton, Alberta	1st	1.96 m^{[a]}
2016	World Indoor Championships	Portland, Oregon	1st	1.96 m
2016	Olympic Games	Rio de Janeiro, Brazil	13th	1.88 m
2017	World Championships	London, United Kingdom	10th	1.92 m
2018	World Indoor Championships	Birmingham, United Kingdom	2nd	1.93 m
2019	World Championships	Doha, Qatar	3rd	2.00 m
2021	Olympic Games	Tokyo, Japan	6th	1.96 m
2022	World Championships	Eugene, United States	18th (q)	1.86 m
2022	NACAC Championships	Freeport, Bahamas	1st	1.92 m
2023	World Championships	Budapest, Hungary	11th	1.90 m
2024	World Indoor Championships	Glasgow, United Kingdom	―	DNS
2024	Olympic Games	Paris, France	5th	1.95 m
2025	World Indoor Championships	Nanjing, China	10th	1.85 m
2025	NACAC Championships	Freeport, Bahamas	2nd	1.91 m
2025	World Championships	Tokyo, Japan	17th (q)	1.88 m

^{a} Pan American junior championships record and world youth record

=== USA national championships and Olympic trials ===
Year	Competition	Venue	Position	Notes
2016	2016 USA Indoor Track and Field Championships	Portland, Oregon	1st	1.99 m
2016	2016 United States Olympic trials	Eugene, Oregon	2nd	1.97 m^{[a]}
2017	2017 USA Indoor Track and Field Championships	Albuquerque, New Mexico	1st	1.96 m
2017	2017 USA Outdoor Track and Field Championships	Sacramento, California	1st	1.99 m^{[b]}
2018	2018 USA Indoor Track and Field Championships	Albuquerque, New Mexico	1st	1.97 m
2018	2018 USA Outdoor Track and Field Championships	Des Moines, Iowa	1st	1.95 m
2019	2019 USA Indoor Track and Field Championships	Staten Island, New York	1st	1.96 m
2019	2019 USA Outdoor Track and Field Championships	Des Moines, Iowa	1st	1.96 m
2020	2020 USA Indoor Track and Field Championships	Albuquerque, New Mexico	1st	1.97 m
2021	2020 United States Olympic trials	Eugene, Oregon	1st	1.96 m
2022	2022 USA Indoor Track and Field Championships	Spokane, Washington	1st	1.91 m
2022	2022 USA Outdoor Track and Field Championships	Eugene, Oregon	1st	1.93 m
2023	2023 USA Indoor Track and Field Championships	Albuquerque, New Mexico	1st	2.00 m
2023	2023 USA Outdoor Track and Field Championships	Eugene, Oregon	1st	1.91 m
2024	2024 USA Indoor Track and Field Championships	Albuquerque, New Mexico	1st	1.92 m
2024	2024 United States Olympic trials	Eugene, Oregon	3rd	1.91 m
2025	USA Indoor Track and Field Championships	Ocean Breeze Athl. Complex, New York, NY	1st	1.94 m
2025	Eugene, Oregon	1st	1.97 m	

^{a} American junior record
^{b} American junior outdoor record
