= Ella Mikkola =

Finnish high jumper (born 2007)

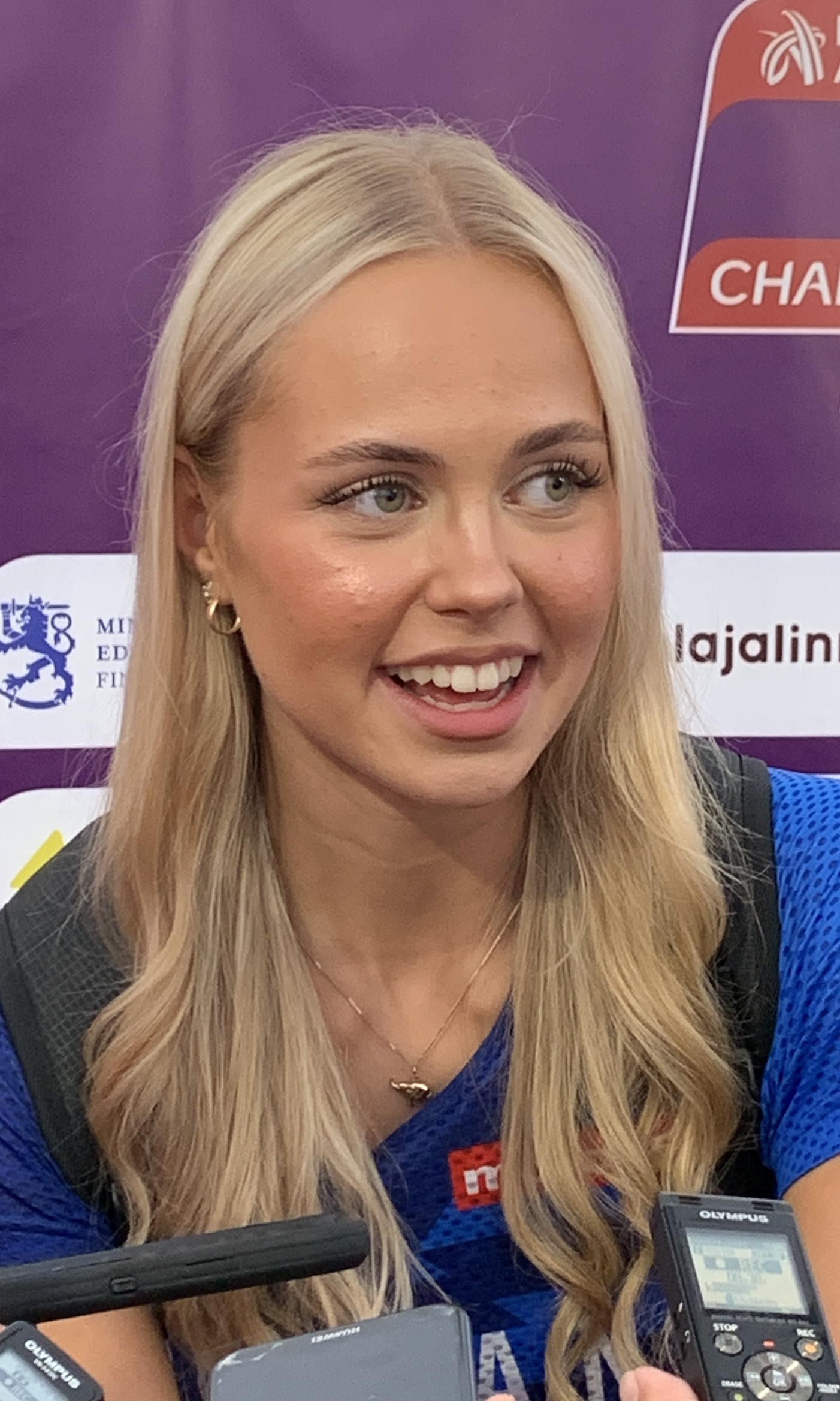

Personal information
- Born: 10 November 2007 (age 18)

Sport
- Sport: Athletics
- Event: High jump

Achievements and titles
- Personal best: High jump 1.91 m (2026) NU20R
Medal record
Women's athletics
Representing Finland
European U20 Championships
Silver medal – second place	2025 Tampere	High jump

Ella Mikkola (born 10 November 2007) is a Finnish high jumper. She won the senior Finnish Athletics Championships title in 2025 and set a Finnish under-20 record height that year.

== Biography ==
Mikkola is from Tampere and took part in many sports as a child, trying high jump for the first time at around the age of eight yesrs-old. She studies sports at Sampo Central High School. She competes as a member of Tampere Pyrintö and began to be coached by Laura Moisio in her early teens. She placed fourth at the 2024 European Athletics U18 Championships in Slovakia.

In June 2025, she set a new personal best height of 1.85 metres at the Keuruu Midsummer Games. In July 2025, she improved her personal best to 1.87 metres whilst jumping at the Lempäälä Jumping Carnival to move to second behind Katja Kilpi on the Finnish all-time U20 list, and second in the European U20 year rankings.

At the start of August 2025, she won the senior Finnish Athletics Championships title at the age of 17 years-old, jumping an under-20 national record of 1.90 metres in Espoo. Later that month, she won a silver medal at the 2025 European Athletics U20 Championships in Tampere, Finland, after recording a 1.89 metres clearance.

On 1 March 2026, she won the high jump with a clearance of 1.85 metres at the Finish Indoor Championships in Espoo. In June, she cleared a new best of 1.91 meters at the Paavo Nurmi Games.
