= Kristina Ovchinnikova =

Kazakhstani high jumper (born 2001)

Personal information
- Nationality: Kazakhstani
- Born: 21 March 2001 (age 25) Almaty, Kazakhstan

Sport
- Sport: Athletics
- Event: High jump
Medal record
Women's athletics
Representing Kazakhstan
Asian Championships
Gold medal – first place	2023 Bangkok	High jump
Asian Indoor Championships
Silver medal – second place	2023 Astana	High jump

Kristina Ovchinnikova (Russian: Кристи́на Овчиннико́ва; born 21 March 2001) is a Kazakhstani athlete. She competed in the women's high jump event at the 2020 Summer Olympics.

== International competitions ==
Year	Competition	Venue	Position	Notes
Representing Kazakhstan
2021	Olympic Games	Tokyo, Japan	28th (q)	1.86 m
2022	World Championships	Eugene, United States	20th (q)	1.86 m
2022	Islamic Solidarity Games	Konya, Turkey	3rd	1.87 m
2023	Asian Indoor Championships	Astana, Kazakhstan	2nd	1.89 m
2023	Asian Championships	Bangkok, Thailand	1st	1.86 m
2023	World University Games	Chengdu, China	6th	1.84 m
2023	World Championships	Budapest, Hungary	25th (q)	1.85 m
2023	Asian Games	Hangzhou, China	4th	1.83 m
2025	World University Games	Bochum, Germany	9th	1.76 m
2026	Asian Indoor Championships	Tianjin, China	7th	1.80 m
