= Nadezhda Dubovitskaya =

Kazakhstani high jumper

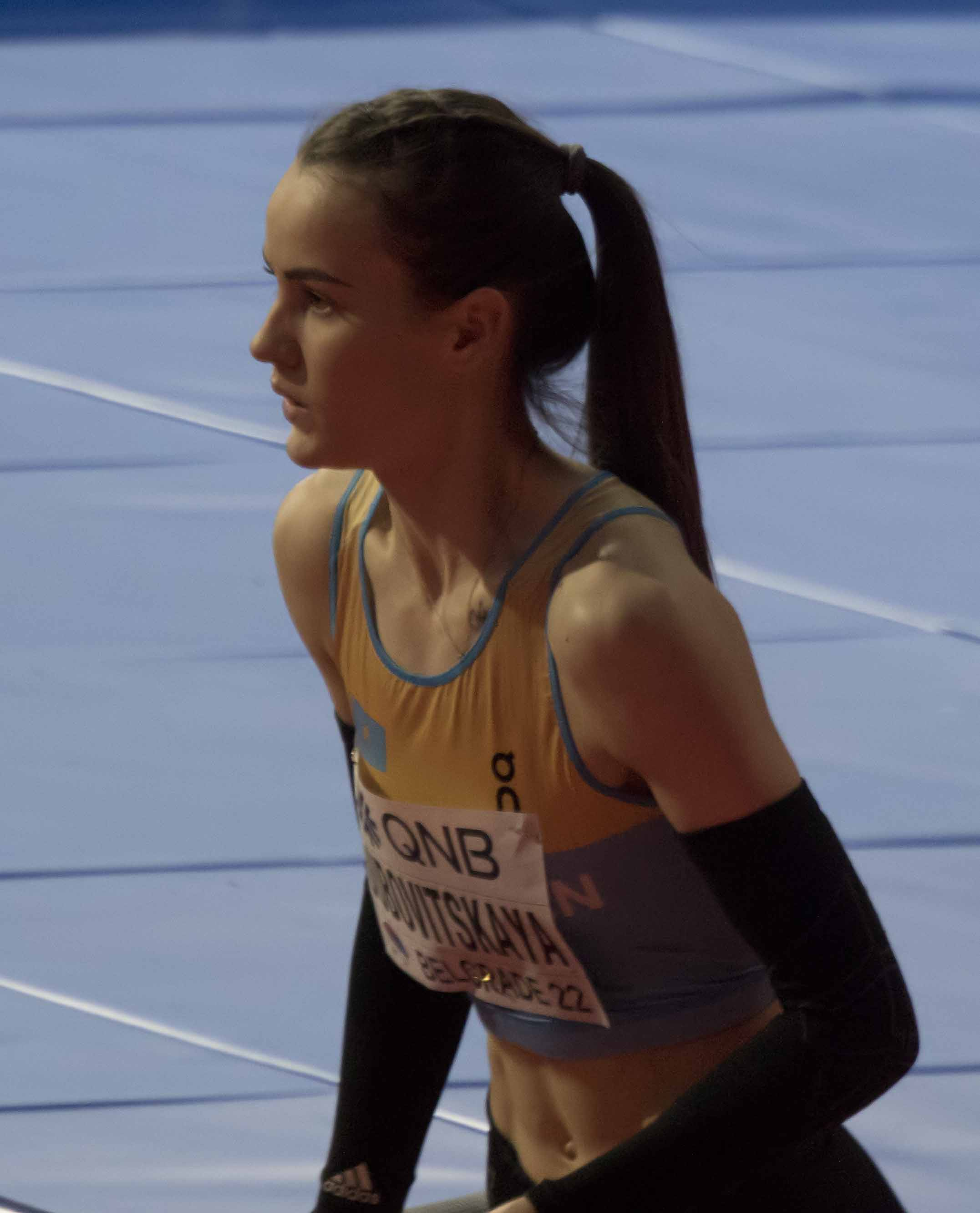
- Nadezhda Dubovitskaya at 2022 Belgrade World Athletics Indoor Championships

Personal information
- Born: 12 March 1998 (age 28) Semipalatinsk, Kazakhstan
- Height: 1.77 m (5 ft 10 in)

Sport
- Sport: Athletics
- Event: High jump
- Coached by: Ivan Khizhnyakov
Medal record
Women's athletics
Representing Kazakhstan
World Indoor Championships
| Bronze medal – third place | 2022 Belgrade | High jump |
Asian Indoor Championships
| Gold medal – first place | 2023 Astana | High jump |
| Bronze medal – third place | 2018 Tehran | High jump |
| Bronze medal – third place | 2026 Tianjin | High jump |

Nadezhda Dubovitskaya (Надежда Дубовицкая, born 12 March 1998) is a Kazakhstani athlete specializing in high jump. She won a bronze medal at the 2018 Asian Games. She has been the Asian record holder in women's high jump since 8 June 2021.

Her personal best is 2.00m outdoors (Almaty 2021), which set a new Asian record, 1 centimeter higher than the previous one made by her compatriot Marina Aitova in 2009. Her personal best indoors is 1.98m (Belgrade 2022).

== International competitions ==
| Year | Competition | Venue | Position | Result |
Representing Kazakhstan
| 2016 | Asian Junior Championships | Ho Chi Minh City, Vietnam | 2nd | 1.74 m |
| 2016 | World U20 Championships | Bydgoszcz, Poland | 16th (q) | 1.74 m |
| 2017 | Asian Championships | Bhubaneswar, India | 6th | 1.75 m |
| 2018 | Asian Indoor Championships | Tehran, Iran | 3rd | 1.80 m |
| 2018 | Asian Games | Jakarta, Indonesia | 3rd | 1.84 m |
| 2019 | Asian Championships | Doha, Qatar | 2nd | 1.88 m |
| 2019 | Universiade | Naples, Italy | 6th | 1.80 m |
| 2021 | Olympic Games | Tokyo, Japan | 28th (q) | 1.86 m |
| 2022 | World Indoor Championships | Belgrade, Serbia | 3rd | 1.98 m |
| 2022 | World Championships | Eugene, United States | 8th | 1.96 m |
| 2023 | Asian Indoor Championships | Astana, Kazakhstan | 1st | 1.89 m |
| 2023 | World University Games | Chengdu, China | 4th | 1.84 m |
| 2023 | World Championships | Budapest, Hungary | 9th | 1.90 m |
| 2023 | Asian Games | Hangzhou, China | 3rd | 1.86 m |
| 2024 | World Indoor Championships | Glasgow, United Kingdom | 8th | 1.88 m |
| 2024 | Olympic Games | Paris, France | 28th (q) | 1.83 m |
| 2025 | Asian Championships | Gumi, South Korea | 4th | 1.86 m |
| 2026 | Asian Indoor Championships | Tianjin, China | 2nd | 1.87 m |
