= Barnokhon Sayfullaeva =

Uzbekistani high jumper (born 2005)

Personal information
- Nationality: Uzbekistani
- Born: 5 February 2005 (age 21)

Sport
- Sport: Athletics
- Event: High jump

Achievements and titles
- Personal best: 1.90
Medal record
Women's athletics
Representing Uzbekistan
Asian Games
Gold medal – first place	2026 Aichi–Nagoya	High jump
Asian Beach Games
Gold medal – first place	2026 Sanya	High jump
Islamic Solidarity Games
Gold medal – first place	2025 Riyadh	High jump
Asian U20 Championships
Gold medal – first place	2024 Dubai	High jump

Barnokhon Sayfullaeva (Uzbek: Barnoxon Sayfullayeva; born 5 February 2005) is an Uzbekistani track and field athlete who specializes in the high jump. She is an Asian Games and Islamic Solidarity Games gold medalist.

== Career ==
In April 2024, Sayfullaeva competed at the 2024 Asian U20 Athletics Championships and won a gold medal in the high jump with a jump of 1.83 metres.

In November 2025, she competed at the 2025 Islamic Solidarity Games and won a gold medal in the high jump with a jump of 1.84 metres.

In April 2026, she competed at the 2026 Asian Beach Games and won a gold medal in the high jump with an Asian Beach Games record of 1.85 metres. In September 2026, she competed at the 2026 Asian Games and won a gold medal in the high jump with a personal best jump of 1.90 metres.
