= Rubina Yadav =

Indian athlete

Personal information
- Born: 14 January 2001 (age 25)
Medal record
Women's athletics
Representing India
South Asian Games
Silver medal – second place	2019 Kathmandu	High jump

Rubina Yadav (born 14 January 2001) is an Indian athlete from Haryana competing in the high jump event. She was part of the Indian athletics team and finished 9th in the high jump event at the 2022 Asian Games at Hangzhou, China. In April, she achieved the qualifying mark for the Asian Games at the Indian Grand Prix-3 at the Sree Kanteerava Stadium In Bengaluru. She jumped 1.81m to clear the Games qualifying mark of 1.80m. She trains at Inspire Institute of Sport.

== Career ==
- 2023: In May, she won the gold with a jump of 1.80m at the 26th National Federation Cup Senior Athletics Championships, Birsa Munda Foot Ball Stadium, Morabadi, Ranchi.
- 2023: In July, she represented India at the Asian Athletics Championships at Supachalasai National Stadium, Bangkok, Thailand.
- 2019: In October, she won the gold at the 59th National Open Athletics Championships in Ranchi.
