= Nagisa Takahashi =

Japanese high jumper (born 2000)

Personal information
- Full name: 髙橋渚
- Nationality: Japanese
- Born: 15 January 2000 (age 26)

Sport
- Sport: Athletics
- Event: High jump

Achievements and titles
- Personal best: High jump: 1.92 m (2025)

Nagisa Takahashi (髙橋渚, Takahashi Nagisa; born 15 January 2000) is a Japanese high jumper. She is a multiple-time national champion and indoor national record holder. She competed at the 2025 World Championships.

== Biography ==
Takahashi was educated at Tokyo High School and Nihon University. Initially a keen badminton player, she excelled in high jump at school where her PE teacher was affiliated to the local athletics club and encouraged her along; After winning a regional age-group championships she began to take high jumping more seriously.

She became national indoor champion at the 2022 Japanese Indoor Athletics Championships in Osaka in March 2022, with a jump of 1.80 metres. In June of that year she won the Japanese Athletics Championships in Osaka with a jump of 1.81 metres.

She retained her national indoor title at the 2023 Japanese Indoor Athletics Championships in Osaka with a jump of 1.80 metres. She retained her national outdoor title at the 2023 Japanese Athletics Championships in Osaka with a jump of 1.84 metres in June 2023. Competing at the 2023 Asian Athletics Championships in Bangkok, she placed fourth overall with a best jump of 1.83 metres.

She won her third national indoor title at the 2024 Japanese Athletics Championships in Osaka with a jump of 1.86 metres. In May 2024, she set a new personal best of 1.88 metres. She won her third Japanese Championships title in June 2024 in Niigata, with a jump of 1.87 metres.

She won on the World Athletics Indoor Tour Gold in Astana, Kazhakstan in January 2025, with 1.88 metres. The following month, she set a new personal best and a Japanese indoor record with a jump of 1.92 metres competing in the Czech Republic.

At the 2025 Asian Athletics Championships in Gumi, South Korea, she had an eighth place finish. She was named in the Japanese team for the 2025 World Athletics Championships in September 2025 to compete im the women's high jump in Tokyo, Japan, where she cleared 1.88 metres without advancing to the final.
