= 2011 New York Grand Prix =

- Dates: 11 June 2011
- Host city: New York City, United States
- Venue: Icahn Stadium
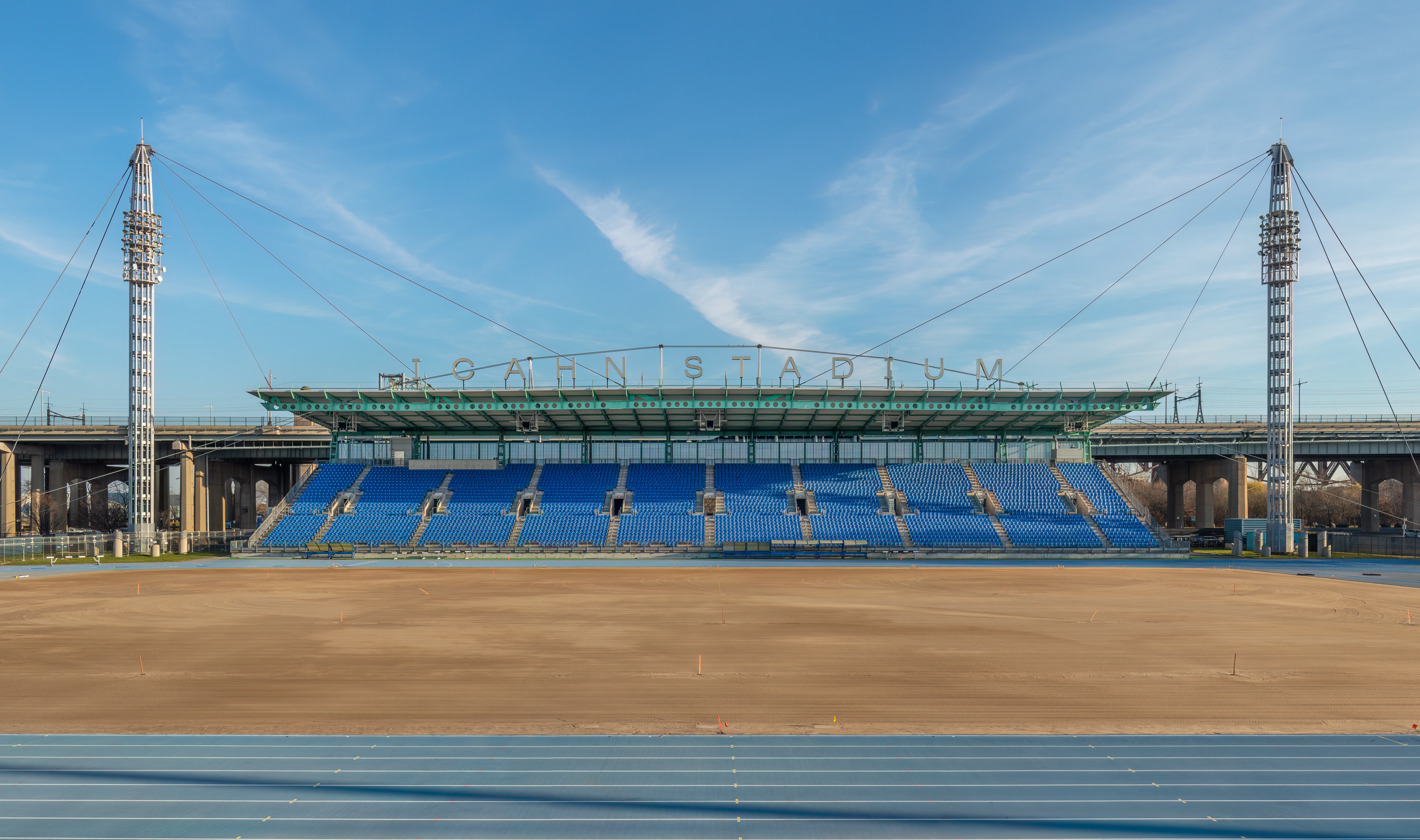
- Level: 2011 Diamond League

The 2011 New York adidas Grand Prix was the 7th edition of the annual outdoor track and field meeting in New York City, United States. Held on 11 June at Icahn Stadium, it was the sixth leg of the 2011 Diamond League – the highest level international track and field circuit.

== Diamond discipline results ==
Podium finishers earned points towards a season leaderboard (4-2-1 respectively), points per event were then doubled in the Diamond League Finals. Athletes had to take part in the Diamond race during the finals to be eligible to win the Diamond trophy which is awarded to the athlete with the most points at the end of the season.

=== Men's ===
100 Metres
Rank	Athlete	Nation	Time	Points	Notes
1st place, gold medalist(s)	Steve Mullings	Jamaica	10.26	4	
2nd place, silver medalist(s)	Tyson Gay	United States	10.26	2	
3rd place, bronze medalist(s)	Keston Bledman	Trinidad and Tobago	10.33	1	
4	Nickel Ashmeade	Jamaica	10.36		
5	Mike Rodgers	United States	10.38		
6	Trell Kimmons	United States	10.51		
—	Richard Thompson	Trinidad and Tobago	DQ		R 162.7
—	Monzavous Edwards	United States	DQ		R 162.7
—	Travis Padgett	United States	DQ		R 162.7
			Wind: (−3.4 m/s)		

400 Metres
Rank	Athlete	Nation	Time	Points	Notes
1st place, gold medalist(s)	Jeremy Wariner	United States	45.13	4	
2nd place, silver medalist(s)	Jermaine Gonzales	Jamaica	45.16	2	
3rd place, bronze medalist(s)	Rondell Bartholomew	Grenada	45.17	1	
4	Chris Brown	Bahamas	45.50		
5	Oscar Pistorius	South Africa	45.69		
6	Kevin Borlée	Belgium	45.86		
7	Renny Quow	Trinidad and Tobago	46.39		
8	Ricardo Chambers	Jamaica	46.74		

800 Metres
Rank	Athlete	Nation	Time	Points	Notes
1st place, gold medalist(s)	Alfred Kirwa Yego	Kenya	1:46.57	4	
2nd place, silver medalist(s)	Mbulaeni Mulaudzi	South Africa	1:46.68	2	
3rd place, bronze medalist(s)	Boaz Kiplagat Lalang	Kenya	1:46.75	1	
4	Lachlan Renshaw	Australia	1:47.33		
5	Bram Som	Netherlands	1:47.34		
6	Karjuan Williams	United States	1:47.59		
7	Rob Novak	United States	1:47.67		
—	Abubaker Kaki Khamis	Sudan	DNF		
—	Matt Scherer	United States	DNF		PM

5000 Metres
Rank	Athlete	Nation	Time	Points	Notes
1st place, gold medalist(s)	Dejen Gebremeskel	Ethiopia	13:05.22	4	
2nd place, silver medalist(s)	Bernard Lagat	United States	13:05.46	2	SB
3rd place, bronze medalist(s)	Tariku Bekele	Ethiopia	13:06.06	1	
4	Isiah Koech	Kenya	13:07.22		
5	Juan Luis Barrios	Mexico	13:09.81		PB
6	Edwin Soi	Kenya	13:11.75		
7	Kaan Kigen Özbilen	Kenya	13:12.07		
8	Alistair Cragg	Ireland	13:12.21		SB
9	Geoffrey Kamworor	Kenya	13:12.23		
10	Lucas Rotich	Kenya	13:15.38		
11	Daniel Lemashon Salel	Kenya	13:19.51		
12	Josphat Bett Kipkoech	Kenya	13:19.96		
13	Daniel Kipchirchir Komen	Kenya	13:20.80		
14	Dennis Chepkongin Masai	Kenya	13:23.53		PB
15	Ben True	United States	13:24.11		PB
16	Thomas Longosiwa	Kenya	13:31.20		
17	John Kemboi Cheruiyot	Kenya	13:38.76		
18	David McNeill	Australia	13:44.04		SB
19	Scott Bauhs	United States	13:45.94		
—	Bolota Asmerom	United States	DNF		
—	Jonathan Pierce	United States	DNF		PM

400 Metres hurdles
Rank	Athlete	Nation	Time	Points	Notes
1st place, gold medalist(s)	Javier Culson	Puerto Rico	48.50	4	SB
2nd place, silver medalist(s)	Bershawn Jackson	United States	48.55	2	
3rd place, bronze medalist(s)	Dai Greene	Great Britain	49.07	1	
4	L. J. van Zyl	South Africa	49.09		
5	Justin Gaymon	United States	49.24		
6	Michael Tinsley	United States	49.46		
7	Jehue Gordon	Trinidad and Tobago	49.79		
8	Johnny Dutch	United States	50.24		

Pole vault
Rank	Athlete	Nation	Height	Points	Notes
1st place, gold medalist(s)	Romain Mesnil	France	5.52 m	4	
2nd place, silver medalist(s)	Brad Walker	United States	5.52 m	2	
3rd place, bronze medalist(s)	Jérôme Clavier	France	5.42 m	1	
4	Damiel Dossevi	France	5.42 m		
5	Fabian Schulze	Germany	5.22 m		
5	Derek Miles	United States	5.22 m		
7	Jeremy Scott	United States	5.22 m		
—	Alhaji Jeng	Sweden	NM		
—	Malte Mohr	Germany	NM		
—	Cheyne Rahme	South Africa	NM		
—	Renaud Lavillenie	France	NM		

Triple jump
Rank	Athlete	Nation	Distance	Points	Notes
1st place, gold medalist(s)	Phillips Idowu	Great Britain	16.67 m (−1.9 m/s)	4	
2nd place, silver medalist(s)	Christian Olsson	Sweden	16.29 m (−3.5 m/s)	2	
3rd place, bronze medalist(s)	Leevan Sands	Bahamas	16.28 m (−0.7 m/s)	1	
4	Marian Oprea	Romania	16.22 m (−3.1 m/s)		
5	Walter Davis	United States	16.09 m (−4.8 m/s)		
6	Tosin Oke	Nigeria	15.90 m (−2.2 m/s)		
7	Teddy Tamgho	France	15.55 m (−4.4 m/s)		
8	Kenta Bell	United States	15.02 m (−3.9 m/s)		
9	Aarik Wilson	United States	14.54 m (−3.4 m/s)		

=== Women's ===
200 Metres
Rank	Athlete	Nation	Time	Points	Notes
1st place, gold medalist(s)	Allyson Felix	United States	22.92	4	
2nd place, silver medalist(s)	Bianca Knight	United States	22.96	2	
3rd place, bronze medalist(s)	Shalonda Solomon	United States	23.03	1	
4	Carmelita Jeter	United States	23.15		
5	Debbie Ferguson-McKenzie	Bahamas	23.25		
6	Charonda Williams	United States	23.45		
7	Shelly-Ann Fraser-Pryce	Jamaica	23.52		
			Wind: (−2.8 m/s)		

1500 Metres
Rank	Athlete	Nation	Time	Points	Notes
1st place, gold medalist(s)	Kenia Sinclair	Jamaica	4:08.06	4	
2nd place, silver medalist(s)	Morgan Uceny	United States	4:08.42	2	
3rd place, bronze medalist(s)	Kalkidan Gezahegne	Ethiopia	4:08.46	1	
4	Gelete Burka	Ethiopia	4:09.84		
5	Anna Willard	United States	4:10.38		
6	Treniere Moser	United States	4:10.40		
7	Malindi Elmore	Canada	4:10.48		
8	Brianna Felnagle	United States	4:11.85		
9	Sally Kipyego	Kenya	4:11.89		
10	Molly Huddle	United States	4:12.03		
11	Lidia Chojecka	Poland	4:13.00		
12	Shannon Rowbury	United States	4:13.11		
13	Marina Munćan	Serbia	4:17.57		
—	Karen Shinkins	Ireland	DNF		PM

100 Metres hurdles
Rank	Athlete	Nation	Time	Points	Notes
1st place, gold medalist(s)	Danielle Carruthers	United States	13.04	4	
2nd place, silver medalist(s)	Kellie Wells	United States	13.06	2	
3rd place, bronze medalist(s)	Tiffany Porter	Great Britain	13.11	1	
4	Lolo Jones	United States	13.22		
5	Ginnie Crawford	United States	13.23		
6	Perdita Felicien	Canada	13.27		
7	Jessica Ennis-Hill	Great Britain	13.27		
8	Delloreen Ennis-London	Jamaica	15.32		
—	Brigitte Foster-Hylton	Jamaica	DNF		
			Wind: (−3.7 m/s)		

3000 Metres steeplechase
Rank	Athlete	Nation	Time	Points	Notes
1st place, gold medalist(s)	Milcah Chemos Cheywa	Kenya	9:27.29	4	
2nd place, silver medalist(s)	Sofia Assefa	Ethiopia	9:27.37	2	
3rd place, bronze medalist(s)	Gulnara Samitova-Galkina	Russia	9:29.75	1	
4	Lydia Rotich	Kenya	9:35.19		
5	Fionnuala McCormack	Ireland	9:37.60		PB
6	Bridget Franek	United States	9:38.92		SB
7	Stephanie Reilly	Ireland	9:42.91		PB
8	Beverly Ramos	Puerto Rico	9:45.78		NR
9	Delilah DiCrescenzo	United States	9:50.61		
10	Lisa Aguilera	United States	9:51.15		
11	Nicole Bush	United States	9:55.17		SB
12	Lindsay Allen	United States	9:56.81		
—	Mardrea Hyman	Jamaica	DNF		

High jump
Rank	Athlete	Nation	Height	Points	Notes
1st place, gold medalist(s)	Emma Green	Sweden	1.94 m	4	SB
2nd place, silver medalist(s)	Blanka Vlašić	Croatia	1.90 m	2	
3rd place, bronze medalist(s)	Sheree Francis-Ruff	Jamaica	1.82 m	1	
3rd place, bronze medalist(s)	Melanie Skotnik	France	1.82 m		
5	Levern Spencer	Saint Lucia	1.82 m		
6	Becky Christensen	United States	1.77 m		
7	Sheena Gordon	United States	1.77 m		
8	Elizabeth Patterson	United States	1.70 m		

Long jump
Rank	Athlete	Nation	Distance	Points	Notes
1st place, gold medalist(s)	Funmi Jimoh	United States	6.48 m (−0.9 m/s)	4	
2nd place, silver medalist(s)	Janay DeLoach Soukup	United States	6.41 m (−1.5 m/s)	2	
3rd place, bronze medalist(s)	Brittney Reese	United States	6.35 m (−2.5 m/s)	1	
4	Viktoriya Rybalko	Ukraine	6.33 m (−0.8 m/s)		
5	Brianna Glenn	United States	6.29 m (−1.9 m/s)		
6	Jovanee Jarrett	Jamaica	6.18 m (−2.4 m/s)		
7	Tianna Bartoletta	United States	6.18 m (−3.1 m/s)		
8	Jessica Ennis-Hill	Great Britain	6.03 m (−3.5 m/s)		
9	Jana Velďáková	Slovakia	6.03 m (−2.5 m/s)		
10	Ineta Radēviča	Latvia	6.01 m (−1.8 m/s)		
11	Ruky Abdulai	Canada	5.96 m (−3.1 m/s)		
12	Blessing Okagbare	Nigeria	5.86 m (−2.2 m/s)		
13	Ivana Španović	Serbia	3.68 m (−2.9 m/s)		

Discus throw
Rank	Athlete	Nation	Distance	Points	Notes
1st place, gold medalist(s)	Stephanie Brown Trafton	United States	62.94 m	4	
2nd place, silver medalist(s)	Gia Lewis-Smallwood	United States	59.89 m	2	
3rd place, bronze medalist(s)	Aretha Thurmond	United States	59.38 m	1	
4	Joanna Wiśniewska	Poland	58.73 m		
5	Żaneta Glanc	Poland	57.97 m		
6	Suzy Powell-Roos	United States	57.69 m		
7	Summer Pierson	United States	55.13 m		
—	Becky Breisch	United States	NM		

Javelin throw
Rank	Athlete	Nation	Distance	Points	Notes
1st place, gold medalist(s)	Christina Obergföll	Germany	64.43 m	4	MR
2nd place, silver medalist(s)	Sunette Viljoen	South Africa	60.39 m	2	
3rd place, bronze medalist(s)	Rachel Yurkovich	United States	58.43 m	1	SB
4	Jarmila Jurkovičová	Czech Republic	57.17 m		
5	Alicia DeShasier	United States	55.70 m		
6	Kara Winger	United States	54.62 m		

== Promotional events results ==
=== Men's ===
100 Metres
Rank	Athlete	Nation	Time	Notes
1st place, gold medalist(s)	Kimmari Roach	Jamaica	10.50	
2nd place, silver medalist(s)	Rondel Sorrillo	Trinidad and Tobago	10.53	
3rd place, bronze medalist(s)	Marc Burns	Trinidad and Tobago	10.56	
4	Leroy Dixon	United States	10.56	
5	Jason Smyth	Ireland	10.60	
			Wind: (−1.5 m/s)	

400 Metres
Rank	Athlete	Nation	Time	Notes
1st place, gold medalist(s)	Michael Bingham	Great Britain	45.42	SB
2nd place, silver medalist(s)	Erison Hurtault	Dominica	46.30	
3rd place, bronze medalist(s)	Jamaal Torrance	United States	46.61	
4	David Gillick	Ireland	46.64	SB
5	Bereket Desta	Ethiopia	47.46	
6	Reggie Witherspoon	United States	48.02	
—	Lionel Larry	United States	DNF	

=== Women's ===
100 Metres
Rank	Athlete	Nation	Time	Heat	Notes
1st place, gold medalist(s)	Marshevet Hooker	United States	11.36	0	
2nd place, silver medalist(s)	Murielle Ahouré-Demps	Ivory Coast	11.55	0	
3rd place, bronze medalist(s)	Gloria Asumnu	United States	11.57	0	
4	Oludamola Osayomi	Nigeria	11.59	0	
5	Lauryn Williams	United States	11.63	0	
6	Alexandria Anderson	United States	11.63	0	
7	Samantha Henry-Robinson	Jamaica	11.83	0	
8	Muna Lee	United States	11.98	0	

== National events results ==
=== Men's ===
800 Metres
Rank	Athlete	Nation	Time	Notes
1st place, gold medalist(s)	Kyle Miller	United States	1:47.27	PB
2nd place, silver medalist(s)	Andrew Ellerton	Canada	1:47.71	
3rd place, bronze medalist(s)	Moise Joseph	Haiti	1:48.09	
4	Tevan Everett	United States	1:48.20	
5	Brian Gagnon	United States	1:48.63	
6	Dustin Emrani	Israel	1:48.95	
7	Julius Mutekanga	Uganda	1:49.07	
8	Darryll Oliver	Jamaica	1:49.57	
9	Pablo Solares	Mexico	1:50.30	
10	Deon Bascom	Guyana	1:52.75	
11	Michael Rutt	United States	1:53.23	
12	Brendon Mahoney	United States	1:54.47	

1500 Metres
Rank	Athlete	Nation	Time	Notes
1st place, gold medalist(s)	David Torrence	United States	3:36.15	
2nd place, silver medalist(s)	Nick Willis	New Zealand	3:36.46	
3rd place, bronze medalist(s)	Caleb Ndiku	Kenya	3:37.04	
4	Henok Legesse	Ethiopia	3:37.47	
5	Nathan Brannen	Canada	3:38.52	
6	Lopez Lomong	United States	3:38.90	
7	Leonel Manzano	United States	3:39.71	
8	Jordan McNamara	United States	3:41.92	
9	Rob Myers	United States	3:43.97	
10	Lee Emanuel	Great Britain	3:44.63	
11	Will Leer	United States	3:45.14	
12	Bobby Curtis	United States	3:55.98	
—	David Krummenacker	United States	DNF	PM

=== Women's ===
400 Metres
Rank	Athlete	Nation	Time	Notes
1st place, gold medalist(s)	Kaliese Spencer	Jamaica	50.98	
2nd place, silver medalist(s)	Rosemarie Whyte	Jamaica	51.54	
3rd place, bronze medalist(s)	DeeDee Trotter	United States	51.87	SB
4	Shana Cox	Great Britain	52.42	
5	Monica Hargrove	United States	52.84	
6	Fantu Magiso	Ethiopia	53.04	
7	Francena McCorory	United States	53.21	
8	Christine Day	Jamaica	53.84	

800 Metres
Rank	Athlete	Nation	Time	Notes
1st place, gold medalist(s)	Molly Ludlow	United States	2:01.09	
2nd place, silver medalist(s)	Erica Moore	United States	2:02.26	
3rd place, bronze medalist(s)	Jemma Simpson	Great Britain	2:02.30	
4	Heather Kampf	United States	2:03.19	
5	Laura Januszewski	United States	2:05.18	
6	Lauren Bonds	United States	2:06.34	PB
7	Kimarra McDonald	United States	2:07.14	
8	Heidi Dahl	United States	2:10.40	
—	Heather Miller	United States	DNF	PM

Pole vault
Rank	Athlete	Nation	Height	Notes
1st place, gold medalist(s)	Lacy Janson	United States	4.27 m	
2nd place, silver medalist(s)	Kylie Hutson	United States	4.22 m	
—	Melinda Owen	United States	NM	
—	Becky Holliday	United States	NM	

== See also ==
- 2011 Diamond League
