= 2012 New York Grand Prix =

- Dates: 9 June 2012
- Host city: New York City, United States
- Venue: Icahn Stadium
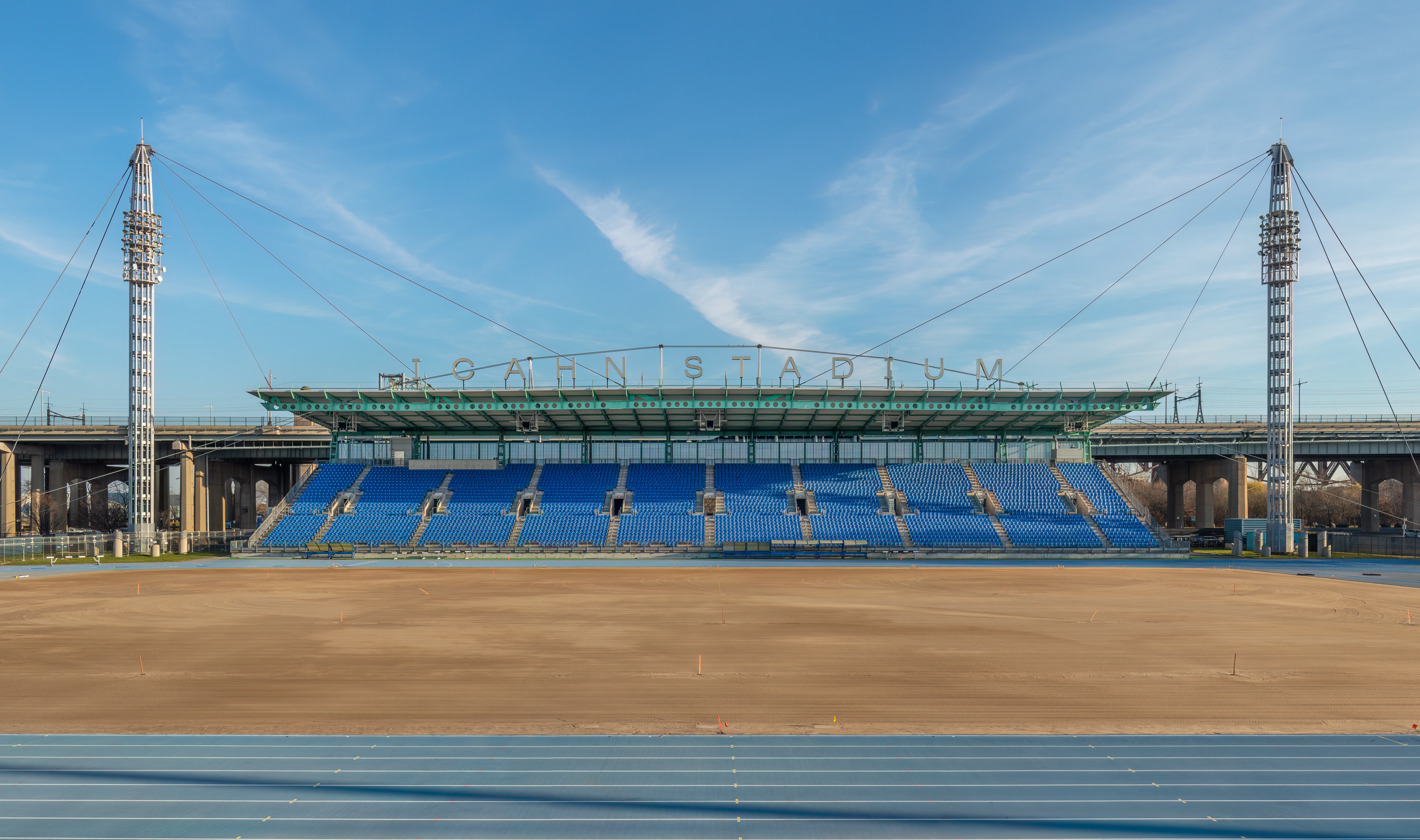
- Level: 2012 Diamond League

The 2012 New York adidas Grand Prix was the 8th edition of the annual outdoor track and field meeting in New York City, United States. Held on 9 June at Icahn Stadium, it was the sixth leg of the 2012 Diamond League – the highest level international track and field circuit.

== Diamond discipline results ==
Podium finishers earned points towards a season leaderboard (4-2-1 respectively), points per event were then doubled in the Diamond League Finals. Athletes had to take part in the Diamond race during the finals to be eligible to win the Diamond trophy which is awarded to the athlete with the most points at the end of the season.

=== Men's ===
200 Metres
| Rank | Athlete | Nation | Time | Points | Notes |
|---|---|---|---|---|---|
| 1st place, gold medalist(s) | Churandy Martina | Netherlands | 19.94 | 4 | NR |
| 2nd place, silver medalist(s) | Nickel Ashmeade | Jamaica | 19.94 | 2 | SB |
| 3rd place, bronze medalist(s) | Warren Weir | Jamaica | 20.08 | 1 | PB |
| 4 | Marvin Anderson | Jamaica | 20.21 | | SB |
| 5 | Jaysuma Saidy Ndure | Norway | 20.35 | | |
| 6 | Rasheed Dwyer | Jamaica | 20.66 | | |
| — | Curtis Mitchell | United States | DQ | | R 162.7 |

400 Metres
| Rank | Athlete | Nation | Time | Points | Notes |
|---|---|---|---|---|---|
| 1st place, gold medalist(s) | Luguelín Santos | Dominican Republic | 45.24 | 4 | |
| 2nd place, silver medalist(s) | Jeremy Wariner | United States | 45.30 | 2 | |
| 3rd place, bronze medalist(s) | Chris Brown | Bahamas | 45.35 | 1 | |
| 4 | Calvin Smith Jr. | United States | 45.44 | | SB |
| 5 | Tabarie Henry | United States Virgin Islands | 45.46 | | |
| 6 | Jermaine Gonzales | Jamaica | 45.53 | | SB |
| 7 | Oscar Pistorius | South Africa | 46.14 | | |

800 Metres
| Rank | Athlete | Nation | Time | Points | Notes |
|---|---|---|---|---|---|
| 1st place, gold medalist(s) | David Rudisha | Kenya | 1:41.74 | 4 | MR, WL |
| 2nd place, silver medalist(s) | Alfred Kirwa Yego | Kenya | 1:44.49 | 2 | SB |
| 3rd place, bronze medalist(s) | Andrew Osagie | Great Britain | 1:44.61 | 1 | PB |
| 4 | Boaz Kiplagat Lalang | Kenya | 1:44.83 | | SB |
| 5 | Robby Andrews | United States | 1:45.06 | | SB |
| 6 | Michael Rutt | United States | 1:45.20 | | PB |
| 7 | Diomar de Souza | Brazil | 1:47.13 | | |
| — | Abubaker Kaki Khamis | Sudan | DNF | | |
| — | Matt Scherer | United States | DNF | | PM |

110 Metres Hurdles
| Rank | Athlete | Nation | Time | Points | Notes |
|---|---|---|---|---|---|
| 1st place, gold medalist(s) | Jason Richardson | United States | 13.18 | 4 | |
| 2nd place, silver medalist(s) | Jeff Porter | United States | 13.26 | 2 | =PB |
| 3rd place, bronze medalist(s) | Orlando Ortega | Cuba | 13.35 | 1 | |
| 4 | David Oliver | United States | 13.37 | | |
| 5 | Ryan Brathwaite | Barbados | 13.48 | | |
| 6 | Omo Osaghae | United States | 13.49 | | |
| 7 | Dwight Thomas | Jamaica | 25.08 | | |
| — | Hansle Parchment | Jamaica | DNF | | |
| — | Aries Merritt | United States | DQ | | R 162.7 |
| | | | Wind: (+0.9 m/s) | | |

High Jump
| Rank | Athlete | Nation | Height | Points | Notes |
|---|---|---|---|---|---|
| 1st place, gold medalist(s) | Jesse Williams | United States | 2.36 m | 4 | MR |
| 2nd place, silver medalist(s) | Robbie Grabarz | Great Britain | 2.36 m | 2 | =MR |
| 3rd place, bronze medalist(s) | Jamie Nieto | United States | 2.31 m | 1 | =SB |
| 3rd place, bronze medalist(s) | Trevor Barry | Bahamas | 2.31 m | 1 | SB |
| 5 | Dimitrios Chondrokoukis | Cyprus | 2.28 m | | |
| 6 | Samson Oni | Great Britain | 2.25 m | | |
| 7 | Donald Thomas | Bahamas | 2.20 m | | |
| 8 | Andra Manson | United States | 2.15 m | | |
| — | Germaine Mason | Great Britain | NM | | |

Long Jump
| Rank | Athlete | Nation | Distance | Points | Notes |
|---|---|---|---|---|---|
| 1st place, gold medalist(s) | Mitchell Watt | Australia | 8.16 m (+1.6 m/s) | 4 | MR |
| 2nd place, silver medalist(s) | Fabrice Lapierre | Australia | 8.14 m (+2.5 m/s) | 2 | |
| 3rd place, bronze medalist(s) | George Kitchens | United States | 7.88 m (−0.3 m/s) | 1 | |
| 4 | Tyrone Smith | Bermuda | 7.73 m (+1.4 m/s) | | |
| 5 | Chaz Thomas | United States | 7.58 m (±0.0 m/s) | | |
| 6 | Walter Davis | United States | 7.18 m (+0.4 m/s) | | |
| 7 | Nafee Harris | United States | 5.84 m (+1.2 m/s) | | |
| — | Mamadou Gueye | Senegal | NM | | |
Best wind-legal performances
| — | Fabrice Lapierre | Australia | 8.10 m (+2.0 m/s) | | |

Discus Throw
| Rank | Athlete | Nation | Distance | Points | Notes |
|---|---|---|---|---|---|
| 1st place, gold medalist(s) | ~~Zoltán Kővágó~~ | ~~Hungary~~ | 66.36 m | ~~4~~ | DQ (Note: Due to doping violations Kővágó's results during this competition were disqualified.) |
| 2nd place, silver medalist(s) | Frank Casañas | Spain | 65.21 m | 2 | |
| 3rd place, bronze medalist(s) | Vikas Gowda | India | 64.86 m | 1 | |
| 4 | Rutger Smith | Netherlands | 64.35 m | | |
| 5 | Lawrence Okoye | Great Britain | 63.87 m | | |
| 6 | Jorge Fernández | Cuba | 63.24 m | | |
| 7 | Benn Harradine | Australia | 62.15 m | | |
| 8 | Casey Malone | United States | 60.61 m | | |
| 9 | Jarred Rome | United States | 60.22 m | | |
| 10 | Lance Brooks | United States | 60.00 m | | |
| 11 | Ian Waltz | United States | 58.52 m | | |
| 12 | Jason Young | United States | 58.46 m | | |
| — | Jason Morgan | Jamaica | NM | | |

=== Women's ===
100 Metres
| Rank | Athlete | Nation | Time | Points | Notes |
|---|---|---|---|---|---|
| 1st place, gold medalist(s) | Shelly-Ann Fraser-Pryce | Jamaica | 10.92 | 4 | SB |
| 2nd place, silver medalist(s) | Tianna Bartoletta | United States | 10.97 | 2 | PB |
| 3rd place, bronze medalist(s) | Carmelita Jeter | United States | 11.05 | 1 | |
| 4 | Allyson Felix | United States | 11.07 | | |
| 5 | Kelly-Ann Baptiste | Trinidad and Tobago | 11.07 | | |
| 6 | Blessing Okagbare | Nigeria | 11.10 | | |
| 7 | Schillonie Calvert | Jamaica | 11.25 | | |
| 8 | Bianca Knight | United States | 11.29 | | |
| 9 | Barbara Pierre | United States | 11.35 | | SB |
| | | | Wind: (−0.1 m/s) | | |

800 Metres
| Rank | Athlete | Nation | Time | Points | Notes |
|---|---|---|---|---|---|
| 1st place, gold medalist(s) | Fantu Magiso | Ethiopia | 1:57.48 | 4 | NR, MR |
| 2nd place, silver medalist(s) | Molly Ludlow | United States | 1:59.18 | 2 | SB |
| 3rd place, bronze medalist(s) | Marilyn Okoro | Great Britain | 1:59.37 | 1 | |
| 4 | Maggie Vessey | United States | 2:00.48 | | |
| 5 | Erica Moore | United States | 2:00.72 | | SB |
| 6 | Jemma Simpson | Great Britain | 2:00.97 | | SB |
| 7 | Ajeé Wilson | United States | 2:02.61 | | PB |
| 8 | Amy Weissenbach | United States | 2:04.03 | | SB |
| 9 | Jenny Simpson | United States | 2:05.79 | | |
| — | Dominique Blake | Jamaica | DNF | | PM |

5000 Metres
| Rank | Athlete | Nation | Time | Points | Notes |
|---|---|---|---|---|---|
| 1st place, gold medalist(s) | Tirunesh Dibaba | Ethiopia | 14:50.80 | 4 | |
| 2nd place, silver medalist(s) | Meseret Defar | Ethiopia | 14:57.02 | 2 | |
| 3rd place, bronze medalist(s) | Gelete Burka | Ethiopia | 15:02.74 | 1 | |
| 4 | Werknesh Kidane | Ethiopia | 15:04.65 | | |
| 5 | Genet Yalew | Ethiopia | 15:22.03 | | |
| 6 | Fionnuala McCormack | Ireland | 15:33.04 | | |
| 7 | Emebet Anteneh | Ethiopia | 15:43.66 | | |
| 8 | Gotytom Gebreslase | Ethiopia | 15:46.89 | | PB |
| 9 | Alissa McKaig | United States | 15:47.68 | | |
| 10 | Tarah Korir | Canada | 16:01.94 | | |
| — | Allie Kieffer | United States | DNF | | |
| — | Jennifer Rhines | United States | DNF | | |
| — | Sule Utura | Ethiopia | DNF | | |
| — | Korene Hinds | Jamaica | DNF | | PM |

400 Metres Hurdles
| Rank | Athlete | Nation | Time | Points | Notes |
|---|---|---|---|---|---|
| 1st place, gold medalist(s) | T'erea Brown | United States | 54.85 | 4 | MR |
| 2nd place, silver medalist(s) | Kaliese Spencer | Jamaica | 54.91 | 2 | |
| 3rd place, bronze medalist(s) | Queen Claye | United States | 55.32 | 1 | SB |
| 4 | Nicole Leach | United States | 55.37 | | SB |
| 5 | Nickiesha Wilson | Jamaica | 56.29 | | SB |
| 6 | Ristananna Bailey-Cole | Jamaica | 56.43 | | SB |
| 7 | Raasin McIntosh | United States | 56.76 | | |
| 8 | Jasmine Chaney | United States | 57.75 | | |

Pole Vault
| Rank | Athlete | Nation | Height | Points | Notes |
|---|---|---|---|---|---|
| 1st place, gold medalist(s) | Fabiana Murer | Brazil | 4.77 m | 4 | WL |
| 2nd place, silver medalist(s) | Yarisley Silva | Cuba | 4.70 m | 2 | SB |
| 3rd place, bronze medalist(s) | Nikoleta Kyriakopoulou | Greece | 4.60 m | 1 | SB |
| 4 | Monika Pyrek | Poland | 4.50 m | | SB |
| 5 | Nicole Büchler | Switzerland | 4.37 m | | SB |
| 6 | Lacy Janson | United States | 4.37 m | | |
| 7 | Mary Saxer | United States | 4.37 m | | SB |
| 8 | Kylie Hutson | United States | 4.22 m | | |
| 9 | Janice Keppler | United States | 4.22 m | | |

Triple Jump
| Rank | Athlete | Nation | Distance | Points | Notes |
|---|---|---|---|---|---|
| 1st place, gold medalist(s) | Olga Rypakova | Kazakhstan | 14.71 m (−0.9 m/s) | 4 | MR |
| 2nd place, silver medalist(s) | Kimberly Williams | Jamaica | 14.45 m (−0.3 m/s) | 2 | |
| 3rd place, bronze medalist(s) | Dailenys Alcántara | Cuba | 14.24 m (+0.7 m/s) | 1 | |
| 4 | Keila Costa | Brazil | 14.12 m (−0.3 m/s) | | |
| 5 | Yargelis Savigne | Cuba | 14.08 m (−0.7 m/s) | | |
| 6 | Josleidy Ribalta | Cuba | 13.80 m (−1.0 m/s) | | |
| 7 | Erica McLain | United States | 13.21 m (−0.6 m/s) | | |
| 8 | Blessing Ufodiama | United States | 12.98 m (±0.0 m/s) | | |

Shot Put
| Rank | Athlete | Nation | Distance | Points | Notes |
|---|---|---|---|---|---|
| 1st place, gold medalist(s) | Valerie Adams | New Zealand | 20.60 m | 4 | MR |
| 2nd place, silver medalist(s) | Jillian Camarena-Williams | United States | 19.62 m | 2 | |
| 3rd place, bronze medalist(s) | Michelle Carter | United States | 19.32 m | 1 | SB |
| 4 | Cleopatra Borel | Trinidad and Tobago | 18.19 m | | |
| 5 | Sarah Stevens-Walker | United States | 17.89 m | | |
| 6 | Julie Labonté | Canada | 17.59 m | | |
| 7 | Zara Northover | Jamaica | 16.01 m | | |

Javelin Throw
| Rank | Athlete | Nation | Distance | Points | Notes |
|---|---|---|---|---|---|
| 1st place, gold medalist(s) | Sunette Viljoen | South Africa | 69.35 m | 4 | AR, MR |
| 2nd place, silver medalist(s) | Barbora Špotáková | Czech Republic | 68.73 m | 2 | SB |
| 3rd place, bronze medalist(s) | Kara Winger | United States | 60.33 m | 1 | |
| 4 | Goldie Sayers | Great Britain | 59.23 m | | |
| 5 | Ásdís Hjálmsdóttir | Iceland | 58.72 m | | SB |
| 6 | Jarmila Jurkovičová | Czech Republic | 56.38 m | | |
| 7 | Rachel Yurkovich | United States | 53.05 m | | |
| 8 | Kateema Riettie | Jamaica | 52.03 m | | |
| 9 | Grace Zollman | United States | 47.48 m | | |

== Promotional events results ==
=== Men's ===
100 metres
| Rank | Athlete | Nation | Time | Notes |
Group A
| 1st place, gold medalist(s) | Yohan Blake | Jamaica | 9.90 | |
| 2nd place, silver medalist(s) | Keston Bledman | Trinidad and Tobago | 9.93 | |
| 3rd place, bronze medalist(s) | Mike Rodgers | United States | 9.99 | |
| 4 | Richard Thompson | Trinidad and Tobago | 10.09 | |
| 5 | Trell Kimmons | United States | 10.15 | |
| 6 | Daniel Bailey | Antigua and Barbuda | 10.20 | |
| 7 | Gerald Phiri | Zambia | 10.21 | |
| 8 | Travis Padgett | United States | 10.23 | |
| 9 | Ramone McKenzie | Jamaica | 10.27 | |
| | | | Wind: (+0.7 m/s) | |
Group B
| 1st place, gold medalist(s) | Tyson Gay | United States | 10.00 | |
| 2nd place, silver medalist(s) | Kemar Bailey-Cole | Jamaica | 10.30 | |
| 3rd place, bronze medalist(s) | Jason Young | Jamaica | 10.30 | |
| 4 | Aaron Armstrong | Trinidad and Tobago | 10.46 | SB |
| 5 | Jeremy Bascom | Guyana | 10.52 | |
| 6 | Ahmad Rashad | United States | 10.55 | |
| 7 | Rushane Scott | Jamaica | 10.59 | |
| | | | Wind: (−1.5 m/s) | |

400 Metres
| Rank | Athlete | Nation | Time | Notes |
|---|---|---|---|---|
| 1st place, gold medalist(s) | Jordan Boase | United States | 45.73 | |
| 2nd place, silver medalist(s) | Ricardo Chambers | Jamaica | 45.82 | |
| 3rd place, bronze medalist(s) | David Neville | United States | 45.99 | SB |
| 4 | Renny Quow | Trinidad and Tobago | 46.15 | |
| 5 | Allodin Fothergill | Jamaica | 46.40 | |
| 6 | Brycen Spratling | United States | 46.44 | |
| 7 | Michael Bingham | Great Britain | 46.99 | |

1500 Metres
| Rank | Athlete | Nation | Time | Notes |
|---|---|---|---|---|
| 1st place, gold medalist(s) | Bernard Lagat | United States | 3:34.63 | |
| 2nd place, silver medalist(s) | Ayanleh Souleiman | Djibouti | 3:34.73 | |
| 3rd place, bronze medalist(s) | David Torrence | United States | 3:35.48 | |
| 4 | Nathan Brannen | Canada | 3:35.78 | |
| 5 | Mohamad Al-Garni | Qatar | 3:36.63 | |
| 6 | Fouad Elkaam | Morocco | 3:36.68 | |
| 7 | Will Leer | United States | 3:37.16 | SB |
| 8 | Augustine Kiprono Choge | Kenya | 3:37.47 | |
| 9 | Peter van der Westhuizen | South Africa | 3:37.93 | |
| 10 | Zane Robertson | New Zealand | 3:38.80 | |
| 11 | Alan Webb | United States | 3:39.04 | |
| 12 | Elijah Kipchirchir Kiptoo | Kenya | 3:39.31 | |
| ~~13~~ | ~~Mohammed Shaween~~ | ~~Saudi Arabia~~ | ~~3:39.46~~ | DQ (Note: Due to doping violations Shaween's results during this competition were disqualified.) |
| 14 | Carsten Schlangen | Germany | 3:39.63 | |
| 15 | Craig Mottram | Australia | 3:40.01 | SB |
| 16 | Andrew J. Acosta | United States | 3:41.89 | |
| 17 | Hamish Carson | New Zealand | 3:42.08 | |
| 18 | Ryan McNiff | United States | 3:42.33 | |
| 19 | Nicholas Kiptanui Kemboi | Kenya | 3:43.81 | |
| — | Liam Adams | Australia | DNF | |

== National events results ==
=== Women's ===
200 Metres
| Rank | Athlete | Nation | Time | Notes |
|---|---|---|---|---|
| 1st place, gold medalist(s) | Sanya Richards-Ross | United States | 22.09 | |
| 2nd place, silver medalist(s) | Bianca Knight | United States | 22.46 | SB |
| 3rd place, bronze medalist(s) | Mikele Barber | United States | 22.96 | |
| 4 | Samantha Henry-Robinson | Jamaica | 23.04 | SB |
| 5 | Mary Wineberg | United States | 23.51 | SB |
| 6 | Aliann Pompey | Guyana | 23.89 | SB |
| | | | Wind: (−0.3 m/s) | |

400 Metres
| Rank | Athlete | Nation | Time | Notes |
|---|---|---|---|---|
| 1st place, gold medalist(s) | Francena McCorory | United States | 50.06 | PB |
| 2nd place, silver medalist(s) | Novlene Williams-Mills | Jamaica | 50.10 | |
| 3rd place, bronze medalist(s) | Rosemarie Whyte | Jamaica | 50.62 | SB |
| 4 | Christine Ohuruogu | Great Britain | 50.69 | SB |
| 5 | DeeDee Trotter | United States | 50.79 | SB |
| 6 | Jessica Beard | United States | 51.19 | SB |
| 7 | Shana Cox | Great Britain | 51.54 | SB |
| 8 | Patricia Hall | Jamaica | 51.63 | |

== See also ==
- 2012 Diamond League
