= 2013 New York Grand Prix =

- Dates: 25 May 2013
- Host city: New York City, United States
- Venue: Icahn Stadium
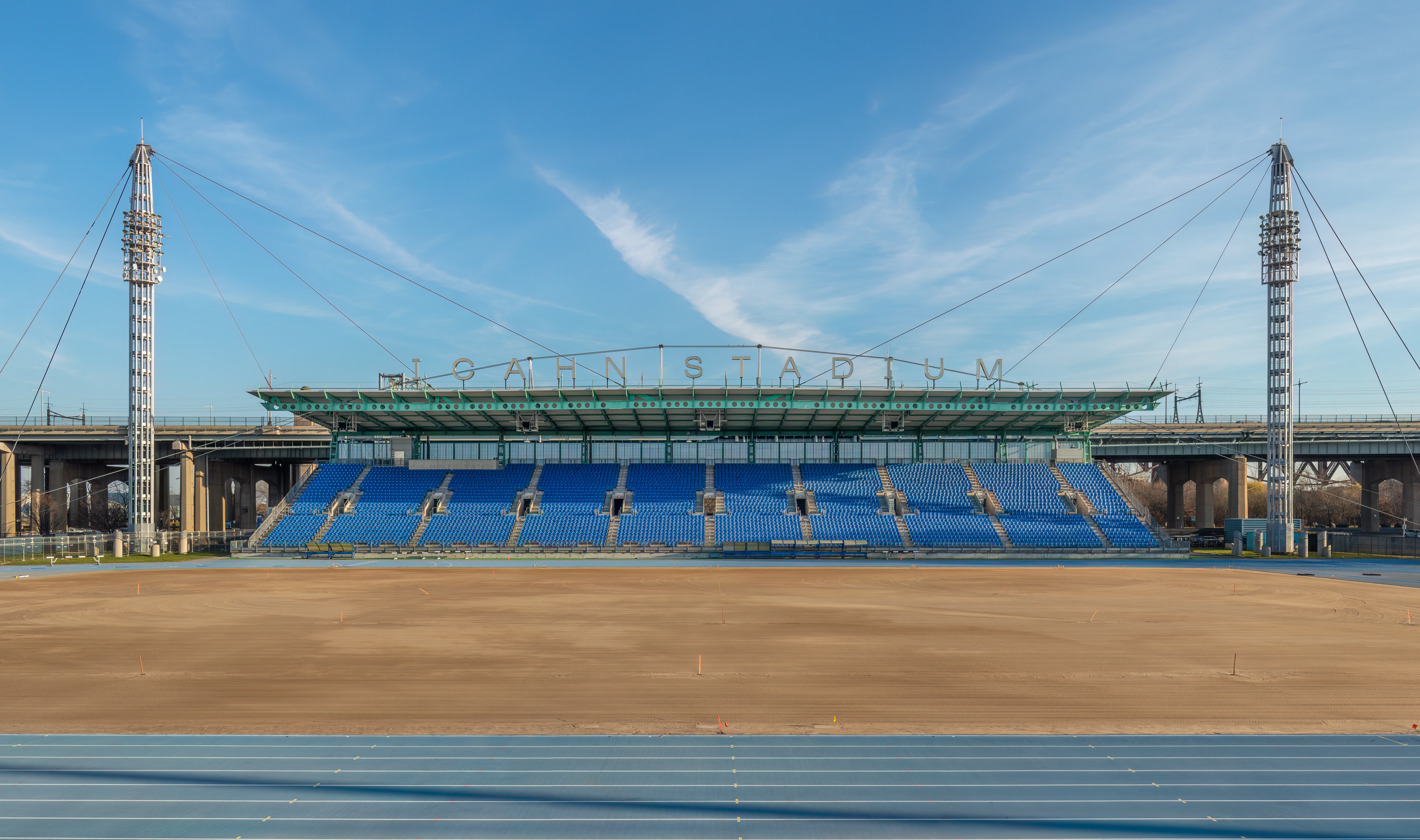
- Level: 2013 Diamond League

The 2013 New York adidas Grand Prix was the 9th edition of the annual outdoor track and field meeting in New York City, United States. Held on 25 May at Icahn Stadium, it was the fourth leg of the 2013 Diamond League – the highest level international track and field circuit.

== Diamond discipline results ==
Podium finishers earned points towards a season leaderboard (4-2-1 respectively), points per event were then doubled in the Diamond League Finals. Athletes had to take part in the Diamond race during the finals to be eligible to win the Diamond trophy which is awarded to the athlete with the most points at the end of the season.

=== Men's ===
100 metres - Heats
| Rank | Athlete | Nation | Time | Notes |
Heat 1
| ~~1~~ | ~~Tyson Gay~~ | ~~United States~~ | ~~10.30~~ | DQ (Note: Due to doping violations Gay's results during this competition were disqualified.), Q |
| 2 | Kemar Bailey-Cole | Jamaica | 10.46 | Q |
| 3 | Mookie Salaam | United States | 10.58 | Q |
| 4 | Gerald Phiri | Zambia | 10.58 | |
| 5 | Trell Kimmons | United States | 10.58 | |
| 6 | Daniel Bailey | Antigua and Barbuda | 10.61 | |
| 7 | Terrell Wilks | United States | 10.65 | |
| 8 | Richard Thompson | Trinidad and Tobago | 10.68 | |
| | | | Wind: (+1.0 m/s) | |
Heat 2
| 1 | Nickel Ashmeade | Jamaica | 10.20 | Q |
| 2 | Ryan Bailey | United States | 10.28 | Q |
| 3 | Keston Bledman | Trinidad and Tobago | 10.29 | Q |
| 4 | Nesta Carter | Jamaica | 10.29 | q |
| 5 | Jak Ali Harvey | Jamaica | 10.37 | q |
| 6 | Justyn Warner | Canada | 10.54 | q |
| 7 | Jeremy Bascom | Guyana | 10.64 | |
| | | | Wind: (−0.1 m/s) | |

100 Metres
| Rank | Athlete | Nation | Time | Points | Notes |
|---|---|---|---|---|---|
| 1st place, gold medalist(s) | ~~Tyson Gay~~ | ~~United States~~ | ~~10.30~~ | 4 | DQ (Note: Due to doping violations Gay's results during this competition were disqualified.) |
| 2nd place, silver medalist(s) | Ryan Bailey | United States | 10.15 | 2 | |
| 3rd place, bronze medalist(s) | Keston Bledman | Trinidad and Tobago | 10.16 | 1 | |
| 4 | Nesta Carter | Jamaica | 10.24 | | |
| 5 | Jak Ali Harvey | Jamaica | 10.29 | | |
| 6 | Nickel Ashmeade | Jamaica | 10.31 | | |
| 7 | Kemar Bailey-Cole | Jamaica | 10.33 | | |
| 8 | Justyn Warner | Canada | 10.60 | | |
| 9 | Mookie Salaam | United States | 10.50 | | |
| | | | Wind: (−0.8 m/s) | | |

800 Metres
| Rank | Athlete | Nation | Time | Points | Notes |
|---|---|---|---|---|---|
| 1st place, gold medalist(s) | David Rudisha | Kenya | 1:45.14 | 4 | |
| 2nd place, silver medalist(s) | Andrew Osagie | Great Britain | 1:46.44 | 2 | |
| 3rd place, bronze medalist(s) | Timothy Kitum | Kenya | 1:46.93 | 1 | |
| 4 | Mbulaeni Mulaudzi | South Africa | 1:47.46 | | |
| 5 | Michael Rutt | United States | 1:47.53 | | |
| 6 | Robby Andrews | United States | 1:48.57 | | |
| 7 | Nathan Brannen | Canada | 1:48.61 | | |
| 8 | Leonel Manzano | United States | 1:48.89 | | |
| 9 | Boaz Kiplagat Lalang | Kenya | 1:50.27 | | |
| 10 | Erik Sowinski | United States | 1:53.68 | | |
| — | Matt Scherer | United States | DNF | | PM |

5000 Metres
| Rank | Athlete | Nation | Time | Points | Notes |
|---|---|---|---|---|---|
| 1st place, gold medalist(s) | Hagos Gebrhiwet | Ethiopia | 13:10.03 | 4 | WL |
| 2nd place, silver medalist(s) | Vincent Chepkok | Kenya | 13:15.51 | 2 | |
| 3rd place, bronze medalist(s) | Ibrahim Jeilan | Ethiopia | 13:16.46 | 1 | |
| 4 | Ben True | United States | 13:16.94 | | |
| 5 | Juan Luis Barrios | Mexico | 13:28.17 | | |
| 6 | Dejen Gebremeskel | Ethiopia | 13:31.02 | | |
| 7 | Mark Kiptoo | Kenya | 13:36.92 | | |
| 8 | Daniele Meucci | Italy | 13:50.53 | | |
| — | Anthony Famiglietti | United States | DNF | | |
| — | Gideon Gathimba | Kenya | DNF | | PM |
| — | David Kiprotich Bett | Kenya | DNF | | PM |

110 Metres hurdles
| Rank | Athlete | Nation | Time | Points | Notes |
|---|---|---|---|---|---|
| 1st place, gold medalist(s) | Ryan Brathwaite | Barbados | 13.19 | 4 | SB |
| 2nd place, silver medalist(s) | Orlando Ortega | Cuba | 13.24 | 2 | |
| 3rd place, bronze medalist(s) | Sergey Shubenkov | Russia | 13.29 | 1 | SB |
| 4 | Omo Osaghae | United States | 13.49 | | |
| 5 | Jeff Porter | United States | 13.49 | | |
| 6 | Dwight Thomas | Jamaica | 13.50 | | |
| 7 | Antwon Hicks | United States | 13.63 | | |
| 8 | Tyron Akins | United States | 13.64 | | |
| 9 | Joel Brown | United States | 13.86 | | |
| | | | Wind: (+1.2 m/s) | | |

400 Metres hurdles
| Rank | Athlete | Nation | Time | Points | Notes |
|---|---|---|---|---|---|
| 1st place, gold medalist(s) | Michael Tinsley | United States | 48.43 | 4 | |
| 2nd place, silver medalist(s) | Javier Culson | Puerto Rico | 48.53 | 2 | |
| 3rd place, bronze medalist(s) | Johnny Dutch | United States | 48.78 | 1 | |
| 4 | Omar Cisneros | Cuba | 49.33 | | |
| 5 | Justin Gaymon | United States | 49.41 | | |
| 6 | Jehue Gordon | Trinidad and Tobago | 49.76 | | |
| 7 | Leford Green | Jamaica | 50.09 | | |
| 8 | Cornel Fredericks | South Africa | 50.73 | | |

Triple jump
| Rank | Athlete | Nation | Distance | Points | Notes |
|---|---|---|---|---|---|
| 1st place, gold medalist(s) | Benjamin Compaoré | France | 16.45 m (−0.8 m/s) | 4 | |
| 2nd place, silver medalist(s) | Christian Taylor | United States | 16.42 m (+0.6 m/s) | 2 | |
| 3rd place, bronze medalist(s) | Gaëtan Saku Bafuanga Baya | France | 16.15 m (+1.9 m/s) | 1 | |
| 4 | Samyr Lainé | Haiti | 16.08 m (+1.4 m/s) | | |
| 5 | Harold Correa | France | 16.07 m (−1.3 m/s) | | |
| 6 | Peder Pawel Nielsen | Denmark | 15.97 m (+2.3 m/s) | | |
| 7 | Tosin Oke | Nigeria | 15.72 m (+1.6 m/s) | | |
| 8 | Cao Shuo | China | 15.02 m (+0.6 m/s) | | |
Best wind-legal performances
| — | Peder Pawel Nielsen | Denmark | 15.60 m (−1.3 m/s) | | |

Shot put
| Rank | Athlete | Nation | Distance | Points | Notes |
|---|---|---|---|---|---|
| 1st place, gold medalist(s) | Ryan Whiting | United States | 21.27 m | 4 | |
| 2nd place, silver medalist(s) | Reese Hoffa | United States | 20.69 m | 2 | |
| 3rd place, bronze medalist(s) | Cory Martin | United States | 20.60 m | 1 | |
| 4 | Joe Kovacs | United States | 20.46 m | | |
| 5 | Dylan Armstrong | Canada | 20.27 m | | |
| 6 | Tomasz Majewski | Poland | 20.11 m | | |
| 7 | Asmir Kolašinac | Serbia | 19.68 m | | |
| 8 | Justin Rodhe | Canada | 19.12 m | | |

=== Women's ===
200 Metres
| Rank | Athlete | Nation | Time | Points | Notes |
|---|---|---|---|---|---|
| 1st place, gold medalist(s) | Veronica Campbell Brown | Jamaica | 22.53 | 4 | SB |
| 2nd place, silver medalist(s) | Anneisha McLaughlin-Whilby | Jamaica | 22.63 | 2 | SB |
| 3rd place, bronze medalist(s) | Shalonda Solomon | United States | 22.91 | 1 | |
| 4 | Sherone Simpson | Jamaica | 22.96 | | |
| 5 | DeeDee Trotter | United States | 23.03 | | PB |
| 6 | Bianca Knight | United States | 23.33 | | |
| 7 | Tiffany Townsend | United States | 23.37 | | |
| 8 | Debbie Ferguson-McKenzie | Bahamas | 23.85 | | |
| | | | Wind: (−1.3 m/s) | | |

400 Metres
| Rank | Athlete | Nation | Time | Points | Notes |
|---|---|---|---|---|---|
| 1st place, gold medalist(s) | Amantle Montsho | Botswana | 49.91 | 4 | MR |
| 2nd place, silver medalist(s) | Natasha Hastings | United States | 50.24 | 2 | SB |
| 3rd place, bronze medalist(s) | Francena McCorory | United States | 51.06 | 1 | |
| 4 | Novlene Williams-Mills | Jamaica | 51.12 | | |
| 5 | Jessica Beard | United States | 51.47 | | SB |
| 6 | Christine Ohuruogu | Great Britain | 52.08 | | |
| 7 | Christine Day | Jamaica | 52.12 | | SB |

1500 Metres
| Rank | Athlete | Nation | Time | Points | Notes |
|---|---|---|---|---|---|
| 1st place, gold medalist(s) | Abeba Aregawi | Sweden | 4:03.69 | 4 | |
| 2nd place, silver medalist(s) | Hellen Obiri | Kenya | 4:04.84 | 2 | |
| 3rd place, bronze medalist(s) | Brenda Martinez | United States | 4:06.25 | 1 | |
| 4 | Nancy Langat | Kenya | 4:06.57 | | |
| 5 | Shannon Rowbury | United States | 4:07.36 | | SB |
| 6 | Sheila Reid | Canada | 4:07.47 | | SB |
| 7 | Morgan Uceny | United States | 4:08.49 | | SB |
| 8 | Kate Grace | United States | 4:08.92 | | |
| 9 | Gabriele Grunewald | United States | 4:09.02 | | |
| 10 | Sarah Brown | United States | 4:09.38 | | |
| 11 | Viola Cheptoo Lagat | Kenya | 4:09.63 | | |
| 12 | Hilary Stellingwerff | Canada | 4:10.70 | | |
| 13 | Btissam Lakhouad | Morocco | 4:11.14 | | |
| 14 | Renata Pliś | Poland | 4:13.45 | | |
| 15 | Amela Terzić | Serbia | 4:18.32 | | SB |
| — | Tizita Bogale | Ethiopia | DNF | | |
| — | Kalkidan Gezahegne | Ethiopia | DNF | | |
| — | Heather Wilson | United States | DNF | | PM |
| — | Kimarra McDonald | Jamaica | DNF | | PM |

3000 Metres steeplechase
| Rank | Athlete | Nation | Time | Points | Notes |
|---|---|---|---|---|---|
| 1st place, gold medalist(s) | Lydiah Chepkurui | Kenya | 9:30.82 | 4 | |
| 2nd place, silver medalist(s) | Etenesh Diro | Ethiopia | 9:33.76 | 2 | |
| 3rd place, bronze medalist(s) | Sofia Assefa | Ethiopia | 9:33.84 | 1 | |
| 4 | Bridget Franek | United States | 9:35.42 | | SB |
| 5 | Purity Cherotich Kirui | Kenya | 9:40.33 | | |
| 6 | Beverly Ramos | Puerto Rico | 9:43.28 | | SB |
| 7 | Claire Perraux | France | 9:43.70 | | PB |
| 8 | Eilish McColgan | Great Britain | 9:45.66 | | |
| 9 | Stephanie Garcia | United States | 9:45.78 | | SB |
| 10 | Ashley Higginson | United States | 9:49.30 | | |
| 11 | Sara Hall | United States | 9:54.88 | | SB |
| 12 | Rolanda Bell | Panama | 9:58.49 | | NR |
| — | Mardrea Hyman | Jamaica | DNF | | PM |

High jump
| Rank | Athlete | Nation | Height | Points | Notes |
|---|---|---|---|---|---|
| 1st place, gold medalist(s) | Blanka Vlašić | Croatia | 1.94 m | 4 | =MR |
| 2nd place, silver medalist(s) | Emma Green | Sweden | 1.91 m | 2 | |
| 3rd place, bronze medalist(s) | Beloved Promise | United States | 1.91 m | 1 | |
| 4 | Levern Spencer | Saint Lucia | 1.85 m | | |
| 5 | Melanie Skotnik | France | 1.80 m | | |
| 5 | Doreen Amata | Nigeria | 1.80 m | | |
| 5 | Olena Holosha | Ukraine | 1.80 m | | |
| 8 | Priscilla Frederick | United States | 1.80 m | | |

Pole vault
| Rank | Athlete | Nation | Height | Points | Notes |
|---|---|---|---|---|---|
| 1st place, gold medalist(s) | Jenn Suhr | United States | 4.63 m | 4 | |
| 2nd place, silver medalist(s) | Fabiana Murer | Brazil | 4.53 m | 2 | |
| 3rd place, bronze medalist(s) | Yarisley Silva | Cuba | 4.53 m | 1 | |
| 4 | Lacy Janson | United States | 4.53 m | | =SB |
| 5 | Jiřina Kudličková | Czech Republic | 4.38 m | | |
| 6 | Holly Bradshaw | Great Britain | 4.23 m | | |
| 6 | Becky Holliday | United States | 4.23 m | | |
| — | Angelica Bengtsson | Sweden | NM | | |

Long jump
| Rank | Athlete | Nation | Distance | Points | Notes |
|---|---|---|---|---|---|
| 1st place, gold medalist(s) | Janay DeLoach Soukup | United States | 6.79 m (−1.1 m/s) | 4 | MR |
| 2nd place, silver medalist(s) | Shara Proctor | Great Britain | 6.72 m (−0.9 m/s) | 2 | |
| 3rd place, bronze medalist(s) | Éloyse Lesueur-Aymonin | France | 6.67 m (−0.9 m/s) | 1 | SB |
| 4 | Tori Polk | United States | 6.42 m (+0.6 m/s) | | |
| 5 | Erica Jarder | Sweden | 6.31 m (+0.7 m/s) | | |
| 6 | Tori Bowie | United States | 6.31 m (−2.0 m/s) | | |
| 7 | Funmi Jimoh | United States | 6.10 m (+1.1 m/s) | | |
| 8 | Brittney Reese | United States | 5.99 m (−1.2 m/s) | | |
| 9 | Whitney Gipson | United States | 5.74 m (−1.1 m/s) | | |
| — | Jessie Gaines | United States | NM | | |

Discus throw
| Rank | Athlete | Nation | Distance | Points | Notes |
|---|---|---|---|---|---|
| 1st place, gold medalist(s) | Sandra Elkasević | Croatia | 68.48 m | 4 | MR, WL |
| 2nd place, silver medalist(s) | Gia Lewis-Smallwood | United States | 61.86 m | 2 | |
| 3rd place, bronze medalist(s) | Mélina Robert-Michon | France | 61.45 m | 1 | SB |
| 4 | Żaneta Glanc | Poland | 61.02 m | | |
| 5 | Whitney Ashley | United States | 58.17 m | | |
| 6 | Allison Randall | Jamaica | 57.85 m | | SB |
| 7 | Aretha Thurmond | United States | 57.55 m | | |

Javelin throw
| Rank | Athlete | Nation | Distance | Points | Notes |
|---|---|---|---|---|---|
| 1st place, gold medalist(s) | Christina Obergföll | Germany | 65.33 m | 4 | SB |
| 2nd place, silver medalist(s) | Mariya Abakumova | Russia | 64.25 m | 2 | |
| 3rd place, bronze medalist(s) | Kim Mickle | Australia | 63.93 m | 1 | SB |
| 4 | Vera Rebrik | Ukraine | 60.95 m | | |
| ~~5~~ | ~~Martina Ratej~~ | ~~Slovenia~~ | ~~60.51 m~~ | | DQ (Note: Due to doping violations Ratej's results during this competition were disqualified.) |
| 6 | Brittany Borman | United States | 58.73 m | | SB |
| 7 | Sunette Viljoen | South Africa | 57.87 m | | |
| 8 | Ásdís Hjálmsdóttir | Iceland | 56.90 m | | |
| 9 | Kateema Riettie | Jamaica | 51.77 m | | |
| 10 | Leigh Petranoff | United States | 49.99 m | | |

== Promotional events results ==
=== Men's ===
200 Metres
| Rank | Athlete | Nation | Time | Notes |
|---|---|---|---|---|
| 1st place, gold medalist(s) | Warren Weir | Jamaica | 20.11 | SB |
| 2nd place, silver medalist(s) | Alonso Edward | Panama | 20.38 | SB |
| 3rd place, bronze medalist(s) | Jeremy Dodson | United States | 20.65 | |
| 4 | Kind Butler III | United States | 20.68 | SB |
| 5 | Ramone McKenzie | Jamaica | 20.77 | SB |
| 6 | Curtis Mitchell | United States | 20.77 | |
| 7 | Kevin Thompson | Jamaica | 21.43 | SB |
| | | | Wind: (+0.9 m/s) | |

400 Metres
| Rank | Athlete | Nation | Time | Notes |
|---|---|---|---|---|
| 1st place, gold medalist(s) | Joshua Mance | United States | 45.59 | |
| 2nd place, silver medalist(s) | Kevin Borlée | Belgium | 45.71 | SB |
| 3rd place, bronze medalist(s) | Jeremy Wariner | United States | 45.72 | |
| 4 | Tony McQuay | United States | 45.95 | |
| 5 | Michael Bingham | Great Britain | 46.19 | |
| 6 | Riker Hylton | Jamaica | 46.25 | |

=== Women's ===
100 Metres
| Rank | Athlete | Nation | Time | Notes |
|---|---|---|---|---|
| 1st place, gold medalist(s) | Aleen Bailey | Jamaica | 11.37 | |
| 2nd place, silver medalist(s) | Mikele Barber | United States | 11.39 | |
| 3rd place, bronze medalist(s) | LaKeisha Lawson | United States | 11.44 | |
| 4 | Tianna Bartoletta | United States | 11.52 | |
| 5 | Gloria Asumnu | Nigeria | 11.52 | |
| 6 | Jessica Young-Warren | United States | 11.68 | |
| 7 | Marshevet Hooker | United States | 11.75 | |
| 8 | Schillonie Calvert | Jamaica | 11.80 | |
| | | | Wind: (+0.4 m/s) | |

400 Metres
| Rank | Athlete | Nation | Time | Notes |
|---|---|---|---|---|
| 1st place, gold medalist(s) | Patricia Hall | Jamaica | 51.85 | |
| 2nd place, silver medalist(s) | Shana Cox | Great Britain | 52.01 | |
| 3rd place, bronze medalist(s) | Shericka Williams | Jamaica | 52.15 | SB |
| 4 | Monica Hargrove | United States | 52.84 | |
| 5 | Samantha Edwards | United States | 53.63 | |
| 6 | Sophia Smellie | Jamaica | 54.35 | |

== See also ==
- 2013 Diamond League
