= 2014 New York Grand Prix =

- Dates: 14 June 2014
- Host city: New York City, United States
- Venue: Icahn Stadium
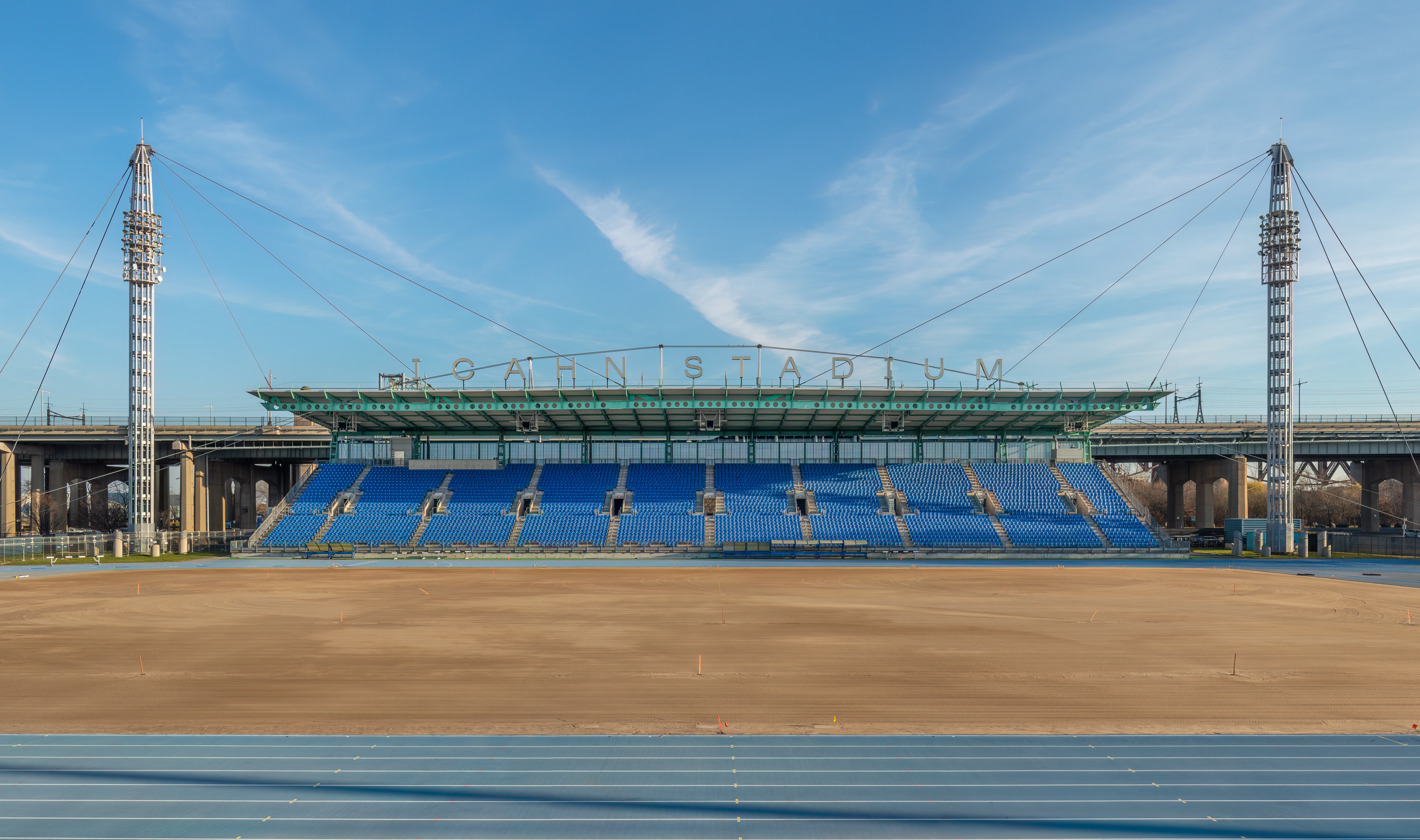
- Level: 2014 Diamond League

The 2014 New York adidas Grand Prix was the 10th edition of the annual outdoor track and field meeting in New York City, United States. Held on 14 June at Icahn Stadium, it was the seventh leg of the 2014 Diamond League – the highest level international track and field circuit.

== Diamond discipline results ==
Podium finishers earned points towards a season leaderboard (4-2-1 respectively), points per event were then doubled in the Diamond League Finals. Athletes had to take part in the Diamond race during the finals to be eligible to win the Diamond trophy which is awarded to the athlete with the most points at the end of the season.

=== Men's ===
200 Metres
Rank	Athlete	Nation	Time	Points	Notes
1st place, gold medalist(s)	Warren Weir	Jamaica	19.82	4	WL
2nd place, silver medalist(s)	Nickel Ashmeade	Jamaica	19.95	2	SB
3rd place, bronze medalist(s)	Alonso Edward	Panama	20.06	1	
4	Wallace Spearmon	United States	20.19		SB
5	Curtis Mitchell	United States	20.29		SB
6	Rasheed Dwyer	Jamaica	20.44		SB
7	James Ellington	Great Britain	20.57		
8	Shōta Iizuka	Japan	21.04		
			Wind: (−0.2 m/s)		

400 Metres
Rank	Athlete	Nation	Time	Points	Notes
1st place, gold medalist(s)	LaShawn Merritt	United States	44.19	4	MR
2nd place, silver medalist(s)	Wayde van Niekerk	South Africa	44.38	2	NR
3rd place, bronze medalist(s)	Chris Brown	Bahamas	44.61	1	SB
4	David Verburg	United States	45.09		
5	Tony McQuay	United States	45.32		
5	Luguelín Santos	Dominican Republic	45.32		
7	Yousef Masrahi	Saudi Arabia	45.57		
8	Lalonde Gordon	Trinidad and Tobago	45.68		

800 Metres
Rank	Athlete	Nation	Time	Points	Notes
1st place, gold medalist(s)	David Rudisha	Kenya	1:44.63	4	SB
2nd place, silver medalist(s)	Mark English	Ireland	1:45.03	2	SB
3rd place, bronze medalist(s)	Duane Solomon	United States	1:45.13	1	
4	Marcin Lewandowski	Poland	1:45.23		
5	Adam Kszczot	Poland	1:45.37		
6	Wesley Vázquez	Puerto Rico	1:45.79		
7	Ferguson Rotich	Kenya	1:45.90		
8	Robby Andrews	United States	1:46.28		SB
9	Michael Rutt	United States	1:46.33		SB
10	Michael Rimmer	Great Britain	1:46.75		SB
—	Daniel Dey	United States	DNF		PM

400 Metres hurdles
Rank	Athlete	Nation	Time	Points	Notes
1st place, gold medalist(s)	Javier Culson	Puerto Rico	48.03	4	WL
2nd place, silver medalist(s)	Michael Tinsley	United States	48.56	2	SB
3rd place, bronze medalist(s)	Cornel Fredericks	South Africa	48.58	1	SB
4	Félix Sánchez	Dominican Republic	49.09		SB
5	L. J. van Zyl	South Africa	49.37		
6	Bershawn Jackson	United States	49.67		
7	Jehue Gordon	Trinidad and Tobago	49.81		
8	Leford Green	Jamaica	50.87		

High jump
Rank	Athlete	Nation	Height	Points	Notes
1st place, gold medalist(s)	Bohdan Bondarenko	Ukraine	2.42 m	4	AR, DLR, WL
2nd place, silver medalist(s)	Mutaz Barsham	Qatar	2.42 m	2	AR, DLR, WL
3rd place, bronze medalist(s)	Andriy Protsenko	Ukraine	2.35 m	1	PB
4	Erik Kynard	United States	2.32 m		
5	Jesse Williams	United States	2.29 m		SB
6	Marco Fassinotti	Italy	2.25 m		
7	Michael Mason	Canada	2.20 m		

Long jump
Rank	Athlete	Nation	Distance	Points	Notes
1st place, gold medalist(s)	Jeff Henderson	United States	8.33 m (+1.6 m/s)	4	MR
2nd place, silver medalist(s)	Christian Taylor	United States	8.06 m (+2.2 m/s)	2	
3rd place, bronze medalist(s)	Ruswahl Samaai	South Africa	8.00 m (+3.7 m/s)	1	
4	Li Jinzhe	China	7.95 m (+2.4 m/s)		
5	Louis Tsatoumas	Greece	7.82 m (+0.7 m/s)		
6	Michel Tornéus	Sweden	7.78 m (+1.3 m/s)		
7	Ignisious Gaisah	Netherlands	7.72 m (+1.0 m/s)		
8	Luis Rivera	Mexico	7.70 m (−0.1 m/s)		
9	Damar Forbes	Jamaica	7.04 m (−1.0 m/s)		
Best wind-legal performances
—	Ruswahl Samaai	South Africa	7.65 m (−1.4 m/s)		
—	Christian Taylor	United States	7.79 m (−0.6 m/s)		
—	Li Jinzhe	China	7.85 m (+1.1 m/s)		

Discus throw
Rank	Athlete	Nation	Distance	Points	Notes
1st place, gold medalist(s)	Robert Harting	Germany	68.24 m	4	MR
2nd place, silver medalist(s)	Piotr Małachowski	Poland	65.45 m	2	
3rd place, bronze medalist(s)	Ehsan Haddadi	Iran	65.23 m	1	SB
4	Robert Urbanek	Poland	64.84 m		
5	Victor Hogan	South Africa	63.47 m		SB
6	Benn Harradine	Australia	62.55 m		
7	Martin Wierig	Germany	62.13 m		
8	Vikas Gowda	India	61.49 m		
9	Erik Cadée	Netherlands	61.25 m		
—	Frank Casañas	Spain	NM		

=== Women's ===
100 Metres
Rank	Athlete	Nation	Time	Points	Notes
1st place, gold medalist(s)	Tori Bowie	United States	11.07	4	
2nd place, silver medalist(s)	Samantha Henry-Robinson	Jamaica	11.13	2	
3rd place, bronze medalist(s)	Schillonie Calvert	Jamaica	11.15	1	SB
4	Kerron Stewart	Jamaica	11.17		
5	Alexandria Anderson	United States	11.22		
6	English Gardner	United States	11.25		SB
7	Carrie Russell	Jamaica	11.27		
8	Octavious Freeman	United States	11.35		SB
9	Gloria Asumnu	Nigeria	11.54		
			Wind: (−0.1 m/s)		

1500 Metres
Rank	Athlete	Nation	Time	Points	Notes
1st place, gold medalist(s)	Abeba Aregawi	Sweden	4:00.13	4	MR
2nd place, silver medalist(s)	Dawit Seyaum	Ethiopia	4:00.66	2	
3rd place, bronze medalist(s)	Jenny Simpson	United States	4:02.54	1	
4	Shannon Rowbury	United States	4:03.36		SB
5	Irene Jelagat	Kenya	4:04.07		SB
6	Treniere Moser	United States	4:04.33		SB
7	Morgan Uceny	United States	4:04.87		SB
8	Brenda Martinez	United States	4:06.42		
9	Renata Pliś	Poland	4:07.03		
10	Alexa Efraimson	United States	4:07.05		PB
11	Nicole Sifuentes	Canada	4:08.11		
12	Viola Cheptoo Lagat	Kenya	4:09.13		
13	Gabriele Grunewald	United States	4:10.12		SB
14	Amela Terzić	Serbia	4:13.16		SB
—	Annette Melcher	United States	DNF		PM
—	Heather Wilson	United States	DNF		PM

3000 Metres
Rank	Athlete	Nation	Time	Points	Notes
1st place, gold medalist(s)	Mercy Cherono	Kenya	8:39.84	4	
2nd place, silver medalist(s)	Betsy Saina	Kenya	8:40.65	2	
3rd place, bronze medalist(s)	Kalkidan Gezahegne	Bahrain	8:42.54	1	
4	Sally Kipyego	Kenya	8:43.43		
5	Kim Conley	United States	8:44.11		
6	Julia Bleasdale	Great Britain	8:48.90		
7	Buze Diriba	Ethiopia	8:51.46		
8	Nikki Hamblin	New Zealand	8:51.48		
9	Chelsea Sodaro	United States	8:52.23		
10	Nicole Tully	United States	8:55.48		
11	Lauren Penney	United States	8:55.55		
12	Ashley Higginson	United States	8:56.67		
13	Gotytom Gebreslase	Ethiopia	8:57.23		
14	Margherita Magnani	Italy	8:57.42		
15	Jessica Tebo	United States	9:01.25		
—	Heidi See	Australia	DNF		PM

100 Metres hurdles
Rank	Athlete	Nation	Time	Points	Notes
1st place, gold medalist(s)	Queen Claye	United States	12.62	4	
2nd place, silver medalist(s)	Dawn Harper-Nelson	United States	12.63	2	
3rd place, bronze medalist(s)	Lolo Jones	United States	12.77	1	
4	Cindy Billaud	France	12.85		
5	Tiffany Porter	Great Britain	12.89		
6	Nia Ali	United States	13.03		SB
7	Shermaine Williams	Jamaica	13.09		
8	Angela Whyte	Canada	13.15		
9	Yvette Lewis	Panama	13.35		
			Wind: (−2.1 m/s)		

3000 Metres steeplechase
Rank	Athlete	Nation	Time	Points	Notes
1st place, gold medalist(s)	Sofia Assefa	Ethiopia	9:18.58	4	MR
2nd place, silver medalist(s)	Purity Cherotich Kirui	Kenya	9:23.43	2	SB
3rd place, bronze medalist(s)	Lydiah Chepkurui	Kenya	9:27.42	1	SB
4	Stephanie Garcia	United States	9:28.96		PB
5	Fancy Cherotich	Kenya	9:46.88		
6	Beverly Ramos	Puerto Rico	9:47.60		SB
7	Rolanda Bell	Panama	10:10.66		
8	Maria Cristina Mancebo	Dominican Republic	10:25.98		
—	Sarah Pease	United States	DNF		PM

Pole vault
Rank	Athlete	Nation	Height	Points	Notes
1st place, gold medalist(s)	Fabiana Murer	Brazil	4.80 m	4	WL
2nd place, silver medalist(s)	Jenn Suhr	United States	4.70 m	2	
3rd place, bronze medalist(s)	Yarisley Silva	Cuba	4.70 m	1	=SB
4	Katerina Stefanidi	Greece	4.60 m		PB
5	Anna Rogowska	Poland	4.50 m		=SB
6	Kylie Hutson	United States	4.25 m		
6	Liz Parnov	Australia	4.25 m		
8	Mary Saxer	United States	4.25 m		
—	Lisa Ryzih	Germany	NM		

Triple jump
Rank	Athlete	Nation	Distance	Points	Notes
1st place, gold medalist(s)	Kimberly Williams	Jamaica	14.31 m (+2.1 m/s)	4	
2nd place, silver medalist(s)	~~Anna Pyatykh~~	~~Russia~~	~~14.19 m (+0.6 m/s)~~	~~2~~	DQ (Note: Due to doping violations Pyatykh's results during this competition were disqualified.)
3rd place, bronze medalist(s)	Yosiris Urrutia	Colombia	14.13 m (+2.6 m/s)	1	
4	Irina Gumenyuk	Russia	13.97 m (+0.5 m/s)		SB
5	Linda Leverton	Australia	13.80 m (+1.3 m/s)		
6	Amanda Smock	United States	13.66 m (+0.4 m/s)		SB
7	Snežana Rodić	Slovenia	13.50 m (+1.3 m/s)		
8	Andrea Geubelle	United States	12.83 m (−0.3 m/s)		
Best wind-legal performances
—	Kimberly Williams	Jamaica	14.30 m (−1.2 m/s)		
—	Yosiris Urrutia	Colombia	13.93 m (+0.5 m/s)		

Shot put
Rank	Athlete	Nation	Distance	Points	Notes
1st place, gold medalist(s)	Valerie Adams	New Zealand	19.68 m	4	
2nd place, silver medalist(s)	Michelle Carter	United States	19.51 m	2	SB
3rd place, bronze medalist(s)	Cleopatra Borel	Trinidad and Tobago	19.04 m	1	
~~4~~	~~Irina Tarasova~~	~~Russia~~	~~18.38 m~~		DQ (Note: Due to doping violations Tarasova's results during this competition were disqualified.)
5	Tia Brooks	United States	17.76 m		
6	Anita Márton	Hungary	17.64 m		
7	Jeneva Stevens	United States	17.35 m		
~~8~~	~~Yevgeniya Kolodko~~	~~Russia~~	~~17.25 m~~		DQ (Note: Due to doping violations Kolodko's results during this competition were disqualified.)

Javelin throw
Rank	Athlete	Nation	Distance	Points	Notes
1st place, gold medalist(s)	Linda Stahl	Germany	67.32 m	4	WL
2nd place, silver medalist(s)	Kathryn Mitchell	Australia	66.08 m	2	
3rd place, bronze medalist(s)	Madara Sady Ndure	Latvia	64.86 m	1	NR
4	Kara Winger	United States	62.47 m		SB
5	Katharina Molitor	Germany	61.67 m		SB
6	Ásdís Hjálmsdóttir	Iceland	59.72 m		
7	Sofi Flink	Sweden	55.99 m		
8	Barbara Madejczyk	Poland	52.58 m		

== Promotional events results ==
=== Men's ===
100 Metres
Rank	Athlete	Nation	Time	Notes
1st place, gold medalist(s)	Nesta Carter	Jamaica	10.09	
2nd place, silver medalist(s)	Yohan Blake	Jamaica	10.21	
3rd place, bronze medalist(s)	Keston Bledman	Trinidad and Tobago	10.23	
4	Gerald Phiri	Zambia	10.29	
5		United States	10.29	
6	Marvin Bracy	United States	10.32	
7	Charles Silmon	United States	10.33	
8	Kemar Bailey-Cole	Jamaica	10.33	
—	Trell Kimmons	United States	DNF	
			Wind: (−1.9 m/s)	

400 Metres
Rank	Athlete	Nation	Time	Notes
1st place, gold medalist(s)	Michael Bingham	Great Britain	45.13	SB
2nd place, silver medalist(s)	Akheem Gauntlett	Jamaica	45.57	SB
3rd place, bronze medalist(s)	Winston George	Guyana	45.57	NR
4	Tabarie Henry	United States Virgin Islands	45.62	SB
5	Payton Hazzard	United States	46.60	
6	Terrance Livingston	Jamaica	46.81	
7	Erison Hurtault	Dominica	46.84	
8		Jamaica	47.51	

800 Metres
Rank	Athlete	Nation	Time	Notes
1st place, gold medalist(s)		United States	1:48.13	
2nd place, silver medalist(s)	Julius Mutekanga	Uganda	1:48.23	
3rd place, bronze medalist(s)	Ben Scheetz	United States	1:48.92	
4	Selasi Lumax	Ghana	1:49.04	
5		Zambia	1:49.70	
6	Brian Gagnon	United States	1:50.26	
7	Leoman Momoh	Nigeria	1:54.96	SB
—	José Alberto Veras	Dominican Republic	DNF	
—		United States	DNF	

=== Women's ===
200 Metres
Rank	Athlete	Nation	Time	Notes
1st place, gold medalist(s)	Tianna Bartoletta	United States	22.68	
2nd place, silver medalist(s)	Natasha Hastings	United States	23.06	SB
3rd place, bronze medalist(s)	Bianca Knight	United States	23.17	
4	Shalonda Solomon	United States	23.19	
5	Anneisha McLaughlin-Whilby	Jamaica	23.22	
6		Nigeria	23.65	
—	Shaunae Miller-Uibo	Bahamas	DNF	
			Wind: (−0.5 m/s)	

400 Metres
Rank	Athlete	Nation	Time	Notes
1st place, gold medalist(s)	Francena McCorory	United States	50.15	SB
2nd place, silver medalist(s)	Stephenie Ann McPherson	Jamaica	51.20	
3rd place, bronze medalist(s)	Anastasia Le-Roy	Jamaica	51.49	SB
4	DeeDee Trotter	United States	51.53	
5	Floria Gueï	France	51.62	SB
6	Shana Cox	Great Britain	52.11	SB
7	Jessica Beard	United States	52.16	
8	Christine Ohuruogu	Great Britain	53.14	

800 Metres
Rank	Athlete	Nation	Time	Notes
1st place, gold medalist(s)	Natoya Goule-Toppin	Jamaica	2:00.28	SB
2nd place, silver medalist(s)	LaTavia Thomas	United States	2:01.11	SB
3rd place, bronze medalist(s)	Marilyn Okoro	Great Britain	2:01.57	SB
4		United States	2:01.67	SB
5	Diane Cummins	Canada	2:02.89	
6	Dureti Edao	Ethiopia	2:04.92	
7	Kate Van Buskirk	Canada	2:05.08	
8	Kerri Gallagher	United States	2:05.91	PB
9	Kimarra McDonald	Jamaica	2:06.06	
10	Lorain McKenzie	Jamaica	2:10.59	
11	Stephanie Herrick	United States	2:10.65	
—	Benita Taylor	United States	DNF	PM

== See also ==
- 2014 Diamond League
