= 2010 New York Grand Prix =

- Dates: 12 June 2010
- Host city: New York City, United States
- Venue: Icahn Stadium
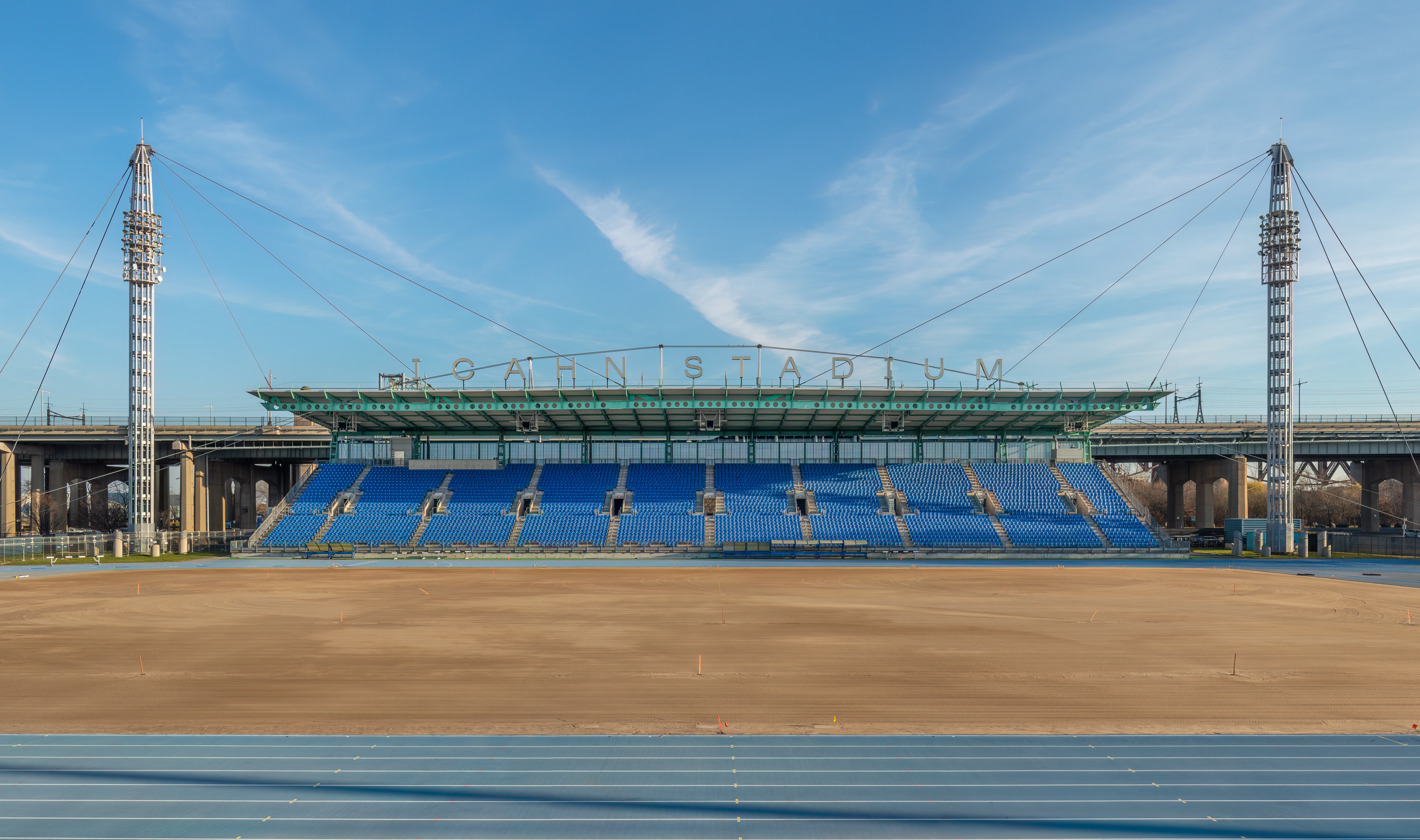
- Level: 2010 Diamond League

The 2010 New York adidas Grand Prix was the 6th edition of the annual outdoor track and field meeting in New York City, United States. Held on 12 June at Icahn Stadium, it was the fifth leg of the 2010 Diamond League – the highest level international track and field circuit.

== Diamond discipline results ==
Podium finishers earned points towards a season leaderboard (4-2-1 respectively), points per event were then doubled in the Diamond League Finals. Athletes had to take part in the Diamond race during the finals to be eligible to win the Diamond trophy which is awarded to the athlete with the most points at the end of the season.

=== Men's ===
100 Metres
Rank	Athlete	Nation	Time	Points	Notes
1st place, gold medalist(s)	Richard Thompson	Trinidad and Tobago	9.89	4	
2nd place, silver medalist(s)	Yohan Blake	Jamaica	9.91	2	
3rd place, bronze medalist(s)	Daniel Bailey	Antigua and Barbuda	9.92	1	
4	Trell Kimmons	United States	9.92		
5	Ivory Williams	United States	9.98		
6	Mike Rodgers	United States	9.99		
7	Churandy Martina	Netherlands Antilles	10.07		
8	Travis Padgett	United States	10.07		
9	Ryan Bailey	United States	10.14		
			Wind: (+2.4 m/s)		

800 Metres
Rank	Athlete	Nation	Time	Points	Notes
1st place, gold medalist(s)	Mbulaeni Mulaudzi	South Africa	1:44.38	4	MR
2nd place, silver medalist(s)	Nick Symmonds	United States	1:45.05	2	
3rd place, bronze medalist(s)	Alfred Kirwa Yego	Kenya	1:45.46	1	
4	Khadevis Robinson	United States	1:45.77		SB
5	Karjuan Williams	United States	1:46.59		
6	Asbel Kiprop	Kenya	1:47.12		
7	Jacob Hernandez	United States	1:47.51		SB
8	Gilbert Kipchoge	Kenya	1:47.98		
9	Christian Smith	United States	1:49.81		
—	Moise Joseph	Haiti	DNF		

400 Metres hurdles
Rank	Athlete	Nation	Time	Points	Notes
1st place, gold medalist(s)	Kerron Clement	United States	47.86	4	MR
2nd place, silver medalist(s)	Bershawn Jackson	United States	47.94	2	SB
3rd place, bronze medalist(s)	Javier Culson	Puerto Rico	48.47	1	
4	Félix Sánchez	Dominican Republic	48.69		SB
5	Isa Phillips	Jamaica	48.98		
6	Michael Tinsley	United States	49.52		
7	L. J. van Zyl	South Africa	49.79		
8	Jehue Gordon	Trinidad and Tobago	49.96		

3000 Metres steeplechase
Rank	Athlete	Nation	Time	Points	Notes
1st place, gold medalist(s)	Paul Kipsiele Koech	Kenya	8:10.43	4	
2nd place, silver medalist(s)	Tarık Langat Akdağ	Kenya	8:15.52	2	
3rd place, bronze medalist(s)	Brimin Kipruto	Kenya	8:18.92	1	
4	Daniel Huling	United States	8:21.68		
5	Steve Slattery	United States	8:25.81		
6	Ben Bruce	United States	8:26.23		
7	Anthony Famiglietti	United States	8:30.84		
8	Brian Olinger	United States	8:34.38		
9	Kyle Alcorn	United States	8:49.22		
10	Krijn Van Koolwijk	Belgium	8:50.19		
11	Billy Nelson	United States	8:50.75		
12	Scott MacPherson	United States	8:54.20		
—	Haron Lagat	Kenya	DNF		

High jump
Rank	Athlete	Nation	Height	Points	Notes
1st place, gold medalist(s)	Linus Thörnblad	Sweden	2.30 m	4	SB
2nd place, silver medalist(s)	Jesse Williams	United States	2.30 m	2	SB
3rd place, bronze medalist(s)	Samson Oni	Great Britain	2.27 m	1	=SB
4	Jaroslav Bába	Czech Republic	2.27 m		SB
4	Donald Thomas	Bahamas	2.27 m		=SB
6	Dusty Jonas	United States	2.24 m		
6	Sylwester Bednarek	Poland	2.24 m		
8	Andra Manson	United States	2.24 m		
9	Tom Parsons	Great Britain	2.24 m		
10	Alessandro Talotti	Italy	2.20 m		
11	Martin Günther	Germany	2.20 m		SB

Pole Vault
Rank	Athlete	Nation	Height	Points	Notes
1st place, gold medalist(s)	Renaud Lavillenie	France	5.85 m	4	MR
2nd place, silver medalist(s)	Steve Hooker	Australia	5.80 m	2	
3rd place, bronze medalist(s)	Przemysław Czerwiński	Poland	5.60 m	1	
4	Giuseppe Gibilisco	Italy	5.60 m		
5	Derek Miles	United States	5.40 m		
6	Malte Mohr	Germany	5.40 m		
7	Michal Balner	Czech Republic	5.40 m		
8	Jeremy Scott	United States	5.20 m		
—	Timothy Mack	United States	NM		

Triple jump
Rank	Athlete	Nation	Distance	Points	Notes
1st place, gold medalist(s)	Teddy Tamgho	France	17.98 m (+1.2 m/s)	4	NR, MR
2nd place, silver medalist(s)	Christian Olsson	Sweden	17.62 m (+3.4 m/s)	2	
3rd place, bronze medalist(s)	Phillips Idowu	Great Britain	17.31 m (+1.9 m/s)	1	
4	Leevan Sands	Bahamas	16.80 m (+2.0 m/s)		=SB
5	Randy Lewis	Grenada	16.76 m (+1.4 m/s)		
6	Samyr Lainé	Haiti	16.60 m (+3.4 m/s)		
7	Kenta Bell	United States	16.46 m (+1.2 m/s)		
8	Brandon Roulhac	United States	16.01 m (+0.5 m/s)		
Best wind-legal performances
—	Christian Olsson	Sweden	17.21 m (+0.1 m/s)		
—	Samyr Lainé	Haiti	16.55 m (+1.4 m/s)		

Javelin throw
Rank	Athlete	Nation	Distance	Points	Notes
1st place, gold medalist(s)	Andreas Thorkildsen	Norway	87.02 m	4	MR
2nd place, silver medalist(s)	Petr Frydrych	Czech Republic	85.04 m	2	
3rd place, bronze medalist(s)	Tero Pitkämäki	Finland	82.57 m	1	
4	Antti Ruuskanen	Finland	81.34 m		
5	Vadims Vasiļevskis	Latvia	77.48 m		
6	Chris Hill	United States	73.48 m		
7	Corey White	United States	66.01 m		
8	Bobby Smith	United States	65.02 m		

=== Women's ===
200 Metres
Rank	Athlete	Nation	Time	Points	Notes
1st place, gold medalist(s)	Veronica Campbell Brown	Jamaica	21.98	4	MR, WL
2nd place, silver medalist(s)	Allyson Felix	United States	22.03	2	
3rd place, bronze medalist(s)	Bianca Knight	United States	22.59	1	SB
4	Kelly-Ann Baptiste	Trinidad and Tobago	22.82		SB
5	Ashlee Kidd	United States	23.16		
6	Emily Freeman	Great Britain	23.37		
7	Charonda Williams	United States	23.41		
			Wind: (+1.4 m/s)		

1500 Metres
Rank	Athlete	Nation	Time	Points	Notes
1st place, gold medalist(s)	Nancy Langat	Kenya	4:01.60	4	MR, WL
2nd place, silver medalist(s)	Meseret Defar	Ethiopia	4:02.00	2	PB
3rd place, bronze medalist(s)	Gelete Burka	Ethiopia	4:03.35	1	
4	Jenny Simpson	United States	4:03.63		SB
5	Shannon Rowbury	United States	4:04.00		
6	Morgan Uceny	United States	4:04.01		PB
7	Christin Wurth-Thomas	United States	4:05.56		
8	Anna Willard	United States	4:05.96		
9	Shalane Flanagan	United States	4:06.44		SB
10	Renata Pliś	Poland	4:06.94		SB
11	Erin Donohue	United States	4:07.22		
12	Treniere Moser	United States	4:07.49		
13	Hilary Stellingwerff	Canada	4:07.76		SB
14	Sara Hall	United States	4:10.11		
15	Lindsey Gallo	United States	4:15.07		
—	Mardrea Hyman	Jamaica	DNF		PM
—	Karen Shinkins	Ireland	DNF		PM

5000 Metres
Rank	Athlete	Nation	Time	Points	Notes
1st place, gold medalist(s)	Tirunesh Dibaba	Ethiopia	15:11.34	4	
2nd place, silver medalist(s)	Sentayehu Ejigu	Ethiopia	15:12.99	2	
3rd place, bronze medalist(s)	Sule Utura	Ethiopia	15:16.61	1	
4	Sally Kipyego	Kenya	15:18.46		
5	Amy Yoder Begley	United States	15:18.96		
6	Megan Wright	Canada	15:19.33		
7	Pauline Korikwiang	Kenya	15:23.82		
8	Aheza Kiros	Ethiopia	15:29.18		
9	Desiree Linden	United States	15:49.39		PB
10	Jennifer Rhines	United States	16:01.77		
11	Eloise Wellings	Australia	16:11.61		
—	Renee Metivier Baillie	United States	DNF		
—	Marina Munćan	Serbia	DNF		PM
—	Sylwia Ejdys	Poland	DNF		PM

100 Metres hurdles
Rank	Athlete	Nation	Time	Points	Notes
1st place, gold medalist(s)	Lolo Jones	United States	12.55	4	WL
2nd place, silver medalist(s)	Perdita Felicien	Canada	12.58	2	SB
3rd place, bronze medalist(s)	Ginnie Crawford	United States	12.63	1	SB
4	Priscilla Lopes-Schliep	Canada	12.67		SB
5	Delloreen Ennis-London	Jamaica	12.71		SB
6	Vonette Dixon	Jamaica	12.75		SB
7	Susanna Kallur	Sweden	12.78		SB
8	Sally Pearson	Australia	12.83		
9	Tiffany Porter	United States	13.09		
			Wind: (+2.0 m/s)		

Long jump
Rank	Athlete	Nation	Distance	Points	Notes
1st place, gold medalist(s)	Brianna Glenn	United States	6.78 m (+3.2 m/s)	4	
2nd place, silver medalist(s)	Ruky Abdulai	Canada	6.66 m (+2.1 m/s)	2	
3rd place, bronze medalist(s)	Funmi Jimoh	United States	6.65 m (+2.8 m/s)	1	
4	Ksenija Balta	Estonia	6.59 m (+1.0 m/s)		
5	Akiba McKinney	United States	6.43 m (+1.5 m/s)		
6	Karin Melis Mey	Turkey	6.42 m (+1.3 m/s)		
7	Keila Costa	Brazil	6.27 m (+1.6 m/s)		
8	Tianna Bartoletta	United States	6.27 m (+1.1 m/s)		
—	Carolina Klüft	Sweden	NM		
Best wind-legal performances
—	Funmi Jimoh	United States	6.50 m (+0.5 m/s)		
—	Brianna Glenn	United States	6.38 m (+1.6 m/s)		
—	Ruky Abdulai	Canada	6.59 m (+1.7 m/s)		

Shot put
Rank	Athlete	Nation	Distance	Points	Notes
1st place, gold medalist(s)	Valerie Adams	New Zealand	19.93 m	4	
2nd place, silver medalist(s)	~~Natallia Mikhnevich~~	~~Belarus~~	~~19.80 m~~	~~2~~	DQ (Note: Due to doping violations Mikhnevich's results during this competition were disqualified.)
3rd place, bronze medalist(s)	Jillian Camarena-Williams	United States	18.99 m	1	
4	Petra Lammert	Germany	18.36 m		
5	Cleopatra Borel	Trinidad and Tobago	17.88 m		
6	Michelle Carter	United States	17.83 m		
7	Sarah Stevens-Walker	United States	17.81 m		
8	Kristin Heaston	United States	15.75 m		

Discus throw
Rank	Athlete	Nation	Distance	Points	Notes
1st place, gold medalist(s)	Sandra Perković	Croatia	61.96 m	4	
2nd place, silver medalist(s)	Aretha Thurmond	United States	61.19 m	2	
3rd place, bronze medalist(s)	Věra Pospíšilová-Cechlová	Czech Republic	60.71 m	1	
4	Gia Lewis-Smallwood	United States	59.70 m		
5	Becky Breisch	United States	59.55 m		
6	Summer Pierson	United States	58.75 m		
7	Anna Jelmini	United States	58.67 m		
8	Stephanie Brown Trafton	United States	55.67 m		

== Promotional events results ==
=== Men's ===
1500 Metres
Rank	Athlete	Nation	Time	Notes
1st place, gold medalist(s)	Nicholas Kiptanui Kemboi	Kenya	3:33.29	MR
2nd place, silver medalist(s)	Deresse Mekonnen	Ethiopia	3:33.85	
3rd place, bronze medalist(s)	Leonel Manzano	United States	3:33.92	
4	Demma Daba	Ethiopia	3:34.06	
5	Bernard Lagat	United States	3:34.36	
6	Lopez Lomong	United States	3:35.77	
7	David Torrence	United States	3:35.81	
8	Matt Tegenkamp	United States	3:36.12	
9	Peter van der Westhuizen	South Africa	3:37.34	
10	Markos Geneti	Ethiopia	3:37.67	
11	Evan Jager	United States	3:38.53	
12	Alistair Cragg	Ireland	3:39.43	
13	Will Leer	United States	3:45.20	
14	Dorian Ulrey	United States	3:47.53	
—	Adam Perkins	United States	DNF	PM
—	David Krummenacker	United States	DNF	PM

=== Women's ===
400 Metres
Rank	Athlete	Nation	Time	Notes
1st place, gold medalist(s)	Amantle Montsho	Botswana	50.79	
2nd place, silver medalist(s)	Shericka Williams	Jamaica	51.24	
3rd place, bronze medalist(s)	Shereefa Lloyd	Jamaica	51.64	
4	Rosemarie Whyte	Jamaica	51.70	
5	Monica Hargrove	United States	52.04	
6	DeeDee Trotter	United States	52.53	
7	Shana Cox	United States	52.70	
8	Melocia Clarke	Jamaica	53.60	

Pole Vault
Rank	Athlete	Nation	Height	Notes
1st place, gold medalist(s)	Jillian Schwartz	Israel	4.60 m	
2nd place, silver medalist(s)	Jenn Suhr	United States	4.50 m	
3rd place, bronze medalist(s)	Chelsea Johnson	United States	4.40 m	
4	Kristina Gadschiew	Germany	4.40 m	
5	Lacy Janson	United States	4.40 m	
6	Gao Shuying	China	4.20 m	

== National events results ==
=== Women's ===
800 Metres
Rank	Athlete	Nation	Time	Notes
1st place, gold medalist(s)	Laura Januszewski	United States	2:03.39	
2nd place, silver medalist(s)	Geena Gall	United States	2:03.59	
3rd place, bronze medalist(s)	Heather Kampf	United States	2:03.83	
4	Heidi Dahl	United States	2:03.98	
5	Rebecca Johnstone	Canada	2:04.02	
6	Sarah Brown	United States	2:04.20	
7	Nikeya Green	United States	2:04.48	
8	Lauren Paquette	United States	2:04.98	

== See also ==
- 2010 Diamond League
