= 2015 New York Grand Prix =

- Dates: 13 June 2015
- Host city: New York City, United States
- Venue: Icahn Stadium
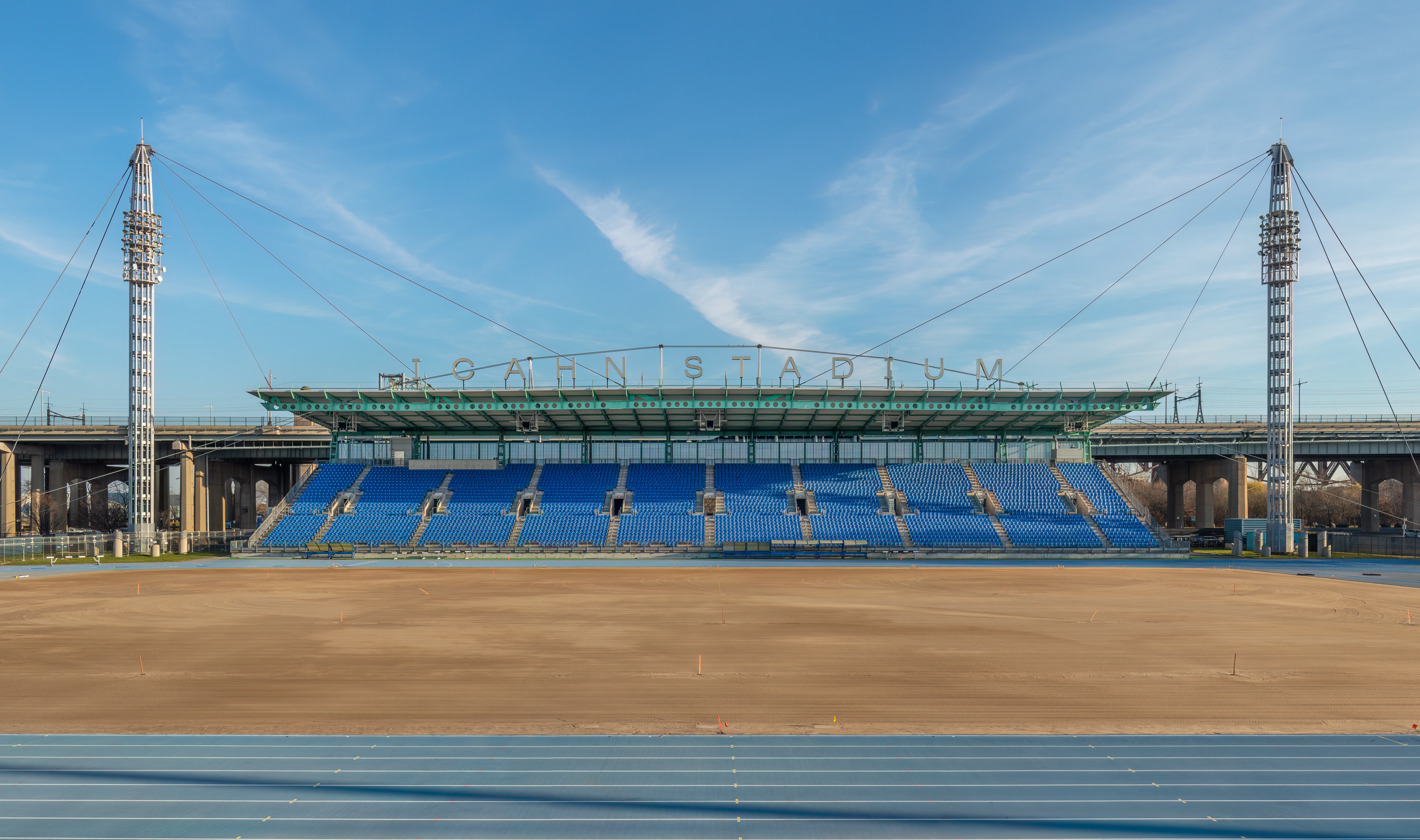
- Level: 2015 Diamond League

The 2015 New York adidas Grand Prix was the 11th edition of the annual outdoor track and field meeting in New York City, United States. Held on 13 June at Icahn Stadium, it was the fifth leg of the 2015 Diamond League – the highest level international track and field circuit.

== Diamond discipline results ==
Podium finishers earned points towards a season leaderboard (4-2-1 respectively), points per event were then doubled in the Diamond League Finals. Athletes had to take part in the Diamond race during the finals to be eligible to win the Diamond trophy which is awarded to the athlete with the most points at the end of the season.

=== Men's ===
100 Metres
Rank	Athlete	Nation	Time	Points	Notes
1st place, gold medalist(s)	Tyson Gay	United States	10.12	4	
2nd place, silver medalist(s)	Keston Bledman	Trinidad and Tobago	10.13	2	
3rd place, bronze medalist(s)	Nesta Carter	Jamaica	10.15	1	
4	Akani Simbine	South Africa	10.18		
5	Diondre Batson	United States	10.24		
6	Nickel Ashmeade	Jamaica	10.28		
7	Trell Kimmons	United States	10.40		
8	Joseph Morris	United States	10.45		
			Wind: (−1.7 m/s)		

800 Metres
Rank	Athlete	Nation	Time	Points	Notes
1st place, gold medalist(s)	David Rudisha	Kenya	1:43.58	4	SB
2nd place, silver medalist(s)	Boris Berian	United States	1:43.84	2	PB
3rd place, bronze medalist(s)	Pierre-Ambroise Bosse	France	1:43.88	1	SB
4	Matthew Centrowitz Jr.	United States	1:44.62		PB
5	Leonel Manzano	United States	1:45.24		SB
6	Robby Andrews	United States	1:45.98		SB
7	Mark English	Ireland	1:46.12		
8	Michael Rutt	United States	1:46.83		
9	Andrew Wheating	United States	1:47.75		SB
—	Duane Solomon	United States	DNF		
—	Ryan Martin	United States	DNF		PM

5000 Metres
Rank	Athlete	Nation	Time	Points	Notes
1st place, gold medalist(s)	Ben True	United States	13:29.48	4	
2nd place, silver medalist(s)	Nick Willis	New Zealand	13:29.78	2	
3rd place, bronze medalist(s)	Nguse Tesfaldet Amlosom	Eritrea	13:30.22	1	PB
4	Thomas Longosiwa	Kenya	13:30.26		
5	Moses Ndiema Kipsiro	Uganda	13:31.37		
6	Arne Gabius	Germany	13:32.68		
7	Nixon Chepseba	Kenya	13:36.25		SB
8	Antonio Abadía	Spain	13:44.91		
9	Frederick Kipkosgei Kiptoo	Kenya	14:07.69		
10	Meresa Kahsay	Ethiopia	14:11.18		
—	Dejen Gebremeskel	Ethiopia	DNF		
—	Grzegorz Kalinowski	Poland	DNF		PM

110 Metres hurdles
Rank	Athlete	Nation	Time	Points	Notes
1st place, gold medalist(s)	David Oliver	United States	13.19	4	
2nd place, silver medalist(s)	Jason Richardson	United States	13.26	2	
3rd place, bronze medalist(s)	Garfield Darien	France	13.32	1	
4	Ronnie Ash	United States	13.33		
5	Orlando Ortega	Cuba	13.34		
6	Jeff Porter	United States	13.34		
7	Shane Brathwaite	Barbados	13.44		SB
8	Aleec Harris	United States	13.50		
9	Ryan Wilson	United States	13.84		
			Wind: (−1.2 m/s)		

400 Metres hurdles
Rank	Athlete	Nation	Time	Points	Notes
1st place, gold medalist(s)	Javier Culson	Puerto Rico	48.48	4	SB
2nd place, silver medalist(s)	L. J. van Zyl	South Africa	48.78	2	SB
3rd place, bronze medalist(s)	Jeffery Gibson	Bahamas	48.97	1	SB
4	Roxroy Cato	Jamaica	48.97		SB
5	Miles Ukaoma	Nigeria	49.25		=SB
6	Jehue Gordon	Trinidad and Tobago	49.34		
7	Annsert Whyte	Jamaica	49.62		

Triple jump
Rank	Athlete	Nation	Distance	Points	Notes
1st place, gold medalist(s)	Pedro Pichardo	Cuba	17.56 m (−2.5 m/s)	4	
2nd place, silver medalist(s)	Will Claye	United States	16.96 m (−0.9 m/s)	2	
3rd place, bronze medalist(s)	Omar Craddock	United States	16.55 m (+0.5 m/s)	1	
4	Ernesto Revé	Cuba	16.53 m (−0.7 m/s)		
5	Tosin Oke	Nigeria	16.47 m (−0.6 m/s)		
6	Chris Benard	United States	16.45 m (+0.3 m/s)		
7	Yordanys Durañona	Dominica	16.25 m (−1.2 m/s)		
8	Benjamin Compaoré	France	15.96 m (−2.5 m/s)		
9	David Wilson	United States	14.66 m (−1.4 m/s)		

Shot put
Rank	Athlete	Nation	Distance	Points	Notes
1st place, gold medalist(s)	Joe Kovacs	United States	21.67 m	4	
2nd place, silver medalist(s)	Jordan Clarke	United States	21.34 m	2	SB
3rd place, bronze medalist(s)	Tom Walsh	New Zealand	21.16 m	1	
4	O'Dayne Richards	Jamaica	21.00 m		=SB
5	Reese Hoffa	United States	20.85 m		
6	Ryan Whiting	United States	20.15 m		
7	Christian Cantwell	United States	20.11 m		
8	Orazio Cremona	South Africa	19.51 m		
9	Jakub Szyszkowski	Poland	19.50 m		

Javelin throw
Rank	Athlete	Nation	Distance	Points	Notes
1st place, gold medalist(s)	Vítězslav Veselý	Czech Republic	83.62 m	4	
2nd place, silver medalist(s)	Ari Mannio	Finland	83.37 m	2	
3rd place, bronze medalist(s)	Hamish Peacock	Australia	82.91 m	1	
4	Thomas Röhler	Germany	81.40 m		
5	Riley Dolezal	United States	81.16 m		SB
6	Marcin Krukowski	Poland	79.87 m		
7	Tim Glover	United States	73.99 m		
8	Guillermo Martínez	Cuba	73.07 m		
9	Rocco van Rooyen	South Africa	72.78 m		

=== Women's ===
200 Metres
Rank	Athlete	Nation	Time	Points	Notes
1st place, gold medalist(s)	Tori Bowie	United States	22.23	4	SB
2nd place, silver medalist(s)	Blessing Okagbare	Nigeria	22.67	2	
3rd place, bronze medalist(s)	Sherone Simpson	Jamaica	22.69	1	
4	Kimberlyn Duncan	United States	22.99		
5	Tiffany Townsend	United States	23.04		
6	Candyce McGrone	United States	23.10		
7	Ángela Tenorio	Ecuador	23.13		
8	Charonda Williams	United States	23.27		
			Wind: (−2.8 m/s)		

400 Metres
Rank	Athlete	Nation	Time	Points	Notes
1st place, gold medalist(s)	Francena McCorory	United States	49.86	4	MR, WL
2nd place, silver medalist(s)	Shaunae Miller-Uibo	Bahamas	50.66	2	
3rd place, bronze medalist(s)	Stephenie Ann McPherson	Jamaica	50.84	1	
4	Natasha Hastings	United States	50.99		
5	Christine Day	Jamaica	51.48		SB
6	Jessica Beard	United States	51.51		SB
7	Floria Gueï	France	51.94		
—	Novlene Williams-Mills	Jamaica	DNF		

800 Metres
Rank	Athlete	Nation	Time	Points	Notes
1st place, gold medalist(s)	Ajeé Wilson	United States	1:58.83	4	
2nd place, silver medalist(s)	Janeth Jepkosgei	Kenya	1:59.37	2	SB
3rd place, bronze medalist(s)	Chanelle Price	United States	1:59.47	1	PB
4	Molly Ludlow	United States	1:59.93		
5	Brenda Martinez	United States	2:00.33		
6	Lynsey Sharp	Great Britain	2:00.37		SB
7	Treniere Moser	United States	2:00.42		SB
8	Jenny Meadows	Great Britain	2:00.55		SB
9	Charlene Lipsey	United States	2:00.60		PB
10	Noélie Yarigo	Benin	2:00.97		SB
11	Kimarra McDonald	Jamaica	2:02.38		SB
12	Viola Cheptoo Lagat	Kenya	2:03.26		SB
—	Monica Hargrove	United States	DNF		PM

3000 Metres Steeplechase
Rank	Athlete	Nation	Time	Points	Notes
1st place, gold medalist(s)	Hiwot Ayalew	Ethiopia	9:25.26	4	
2nd place, silver medalist(s)	Ashley Higginson	United States	9:31.32	2	SB
3rd place, bronze medalist(s)	Sviatlana Kudzelich	Belarus	9:31.70	1	SB
4	Genevieve Gregson	Australia	9:35.17		SB
5	Geneviève Lalonde	Canada	9:35.69		PB
6	Bridget Franek	United States	9:36.88		SB
7	Aisha Praught-Leer	United States	9:39.19		SB
8	Nicole Bush	United States	9:44.68		SB
9	Rolanda Bell	Panama	9:47.16		NR
10	Rebeka Stowe	United States	9:55.12		
11	Ophélie Claude-Boxberger	France	10:00.06		
12	Charlotta Fougberg	Sweden	10:07.08		

High jump
Rank	Athlete	Nation	Height	Points	Notes
1st place, gold medalist(s)	Ruth Beitia	Spain	1.97 m	4	MR
2nd place, silver medalist(s)	Blanka Vlašić	Croatia	1.97 m	2	MR
3rd place, bronze medalist(s)	Levern Spencer	Saint Lucia	1.91 m	1	
4	Isobel Pooley	Great Britain	1.91 m		=SB
5	Chaunté Lowe	United States	1.91 m		SB
6	Priscilla Frederick	Antigua and Barbuda	1.88 m		=NR
—	Doreen Amata	Nigeria	NM		
—	Iryna Kovalenko	Ukraine	NM		

Pole Vault
Rank	Athlete	Nation	Height	Points	Notes
1st place, gold medalist(s)	Fabiana Murer	Brazil	4.80 m	4	SB
2nd place, silver medalist(s)	Nikoleta Kyriakopoulou	Greece	4.80 m	2	=NR
3rd place, bronze medalist(s)	Jenn Suhr	United States	4.54 m	1	
4	Kelsie Ahbe	Canada	4.44 m		PB
4	Yarisley Silva	Cuba	4.44 m		
6	Alyona Lutkovskaya	Russia	4.44 m		
7	Janice Keppler	United States	4.24 m		
—	Katerina Stefanidi	Greece	NM		

Long jump
Rank	Athlete	Nation	Distance	Points	Notes
1st place, gold medalist(s)	Christabel Nettey	Canada	6.92 m (−1.3 m/s)	4	MR
2nd place, silver medalist(s)	Tianna Bartoletta	United States	6.89 m (−0.7 m/s)	2	
3rd place, bronze medalist(s)	Shara Proctor	Great Britain	6.72 m (+0.5 m/s)	1	
4	Funmi Jimoh	United States	6.50 m (−2.4 m/s)		
5	Chelsea Hayes	United States	6.35 m (−0.8 m/s)		
6	Erica Jarder	Sweden	6.34 m (−0.1 m/s)		
7	Keila Costa	Brazil	6.19 m (−0.4 m/s)		
8	Jessie Gaines	United States	6.07 m (−1.6 m/s)		
9	Whitney Gipson	United States	5.65 m (−1.1 m/s)		

Discus throw
Rank	Athlete	Nation	Distance	Points	Notes
1st place, gold medalist(s)	Sandra Elkasević	Croatia	68.44 m	4	
2nd place, silver medalist(s)	Yaime Pérez	Cuba	65.86 m	2	
3rd place, bronze medalist(s)	Mélina Robert-Michon	France	62.77 m	1	
4	Shanice Craft	Germany	62.69 m		
5	Gia Lewis-Smallwood	United States	61.44 m		
6	Whitney Ashley	United States	60.69 m		
7	Liz Podominick	United States	55.51 m		
8	Stephanie Brown Trafton	United States	54.46 m		

== Promotional events results ==
=== Mens's ===
200 Metres
Rank	Athlete	Nation	Time	Notes
1st place, gold medalist(s)	Usain Bolt	Jamaica	20.29	
2nd place, silver medalist(s)	Zharnel Hughes	Anguilla	20.32	
3rd place, bronze medalist(s)	Julian Forte	Jamaica	20.46	
4	Alonso Edward	Panama	20.62	
5	Terrel Cotton	United States	20.63	
6	Rasheed Dwyer	Jamaica	21.06	
7	Charles Silmon	United States	21.24	
			Wind: (−2.8 m/s)	

400 Metres
Rank	Athlete	Nation	Time	Notes
1st place, gold medalist(s)	Wayde van Niekerk	South Africa	44.24	NR
2nd place, silver medalist(s)	Chris Brown	Bahamas	44.74	
3rd place, bronze medalist(s)	Tony McQuay	United States	45.26	
4	David Verburg	United States	45.43	
5	Renny Quow	Trinidad and Tobago	45.57	SB
6	Machel Cedenio	Trinidad and Tobago	45.89	
7	Jeremy Wariner	United States	45.89	SB
8	Winston George	Guyana	46.37	

=== Women's ===
100 Metres
Rank	Athlete	Nation	Time	Notes
1st place, gold medalist(s)	English Gardner	United States	11.00	
2nd place, silver medalist(s)	Samantha Henry-Robinson	Jamaica	11.08	SB
3rd place, bronze medalist(s)	Kelly-Ann Baptiste	Trinidad and Tobago	11.19	
4	Tianna Bartoletta	United States	11.19	
5	Charonda Williams	United States	11.43	
6	Schillonie Calvert	Jamaica	11.60	
			Wind: (+0.4 m/s)	

400 Metres
Rank	Athlete	Nation	Time	Notes
1st place, gold medalist(s)	DeeDee Trotter	United States	51.96	SB
2nd place, silver medalist(s)	Shana Cox	Great Britain	52.62	
3rd place, bronze medalist(s)	Anastasia Le-Roy	Jamaica	52.80	
4	Sophia Smellie	Jamaica	53.17	
5	Zola Golden	United States	53.72	SB
6	Pariis Garcia	United States	54.86	

100 Metres hurdles
Rank	Athlete	Nation	Time	Notes
1st place, gold medalist(s)	Sharika Nelvis	United States	12.65	
2nd place, silver medalist(s)	Tiffany Porter	Great Britain	12.81	
3rd place, bronze medalist(s)	Danielle Williams	Jamaica	12.89	
4	Lolo Jones	United States	12.95	
5	Janay DeLoach Soukup	United States	13.05	SB
6	Kristi Castlin	United States	13.09	
7	Shermaine Williams	Jamaica	13.19	
8	Tenaya Jones	United States	13.21	
			Wind: (−1.7 m/s)	

== See also ==
- 2015 Diamond League
