= Kylie Hutson =

American pole vaulter (born 1987)

Kylie Nicole Hutson (born November 27, 1987) is an American track and field athlete who competes in the pole vault. She was the national champion in the event in 2011 and represented the United States at the World Championships in Athletics in 2011 and 2013. She won four NCAA collegiate titles while at Indiana State University. Her personal records are 4.75 m (15 ft 7 in) indoors and 4.70 m (15 ft 5 in) outdoors.

== Career ==
=== Early life and college ===
Born to Kevin and Susan Hutson in Terre Haute, Indiana, she attended Terre Haute North Vigo High School and took part in diving, volleyball and track and field while there. She began to study exercise science at Indiana State University in 2006 and competed collegiately in the pole vault for the Indiana State Sycamores. In her freshman year she won both Missouri Valley Conference titles indoors and outdoors and reached the NCAA Championships. She repeated her regional double in 2008, setting a new personal record of 4.30 m (14 ft 1 1/4 in) in the process. She was a finalist indoors and outdoors at the NCAA meets and also competed in qualifying at the 2008 United States Olympic Trials.

In her final two years at Indiana State she extended her regional undefeated streak and took two consecutive victories at both the NCAA Women's Division I Indoor Track and Field Championships and the NCAA Outdoor Championships. She graduated in 2011 as the school record holder at 4.51 m (14 ft 9 1/2 in) outdoors and 4.50 m (14 ft 9 in) indoors. She also set the Missouri Valley Conference record at 4.48 m (14 ft 8 1/4 in).

=== World Championships ===
Turning professional in 2011, she came fifth at the 2011 USA Indoor Track and Field Championships then improved her best to 4.70 m (15 ft 5 in) in April. She took straight wins at the Mt SAC Relays, Kansas Relays and Drake Relays then competed on the 2011 IAAF Diamond League circuit, taking fifth at the Prefontaine Classic and runner-up at the Adidas Grand Prix in New York. At the 2011 USA Outdoor Track and Field Championships she broke Jenn Suhr's four-year winning streak and lifted the national title with a vault of 4.65 m (15 ft 3 in). As a result, she was given her first national selection, though she competed in qualifying only at the 2011 World Championships in Athletics while Suhr took fourth.

Hutson did not maintain her level of performance in the 2012, having a season's best of 4.52 m (14 ft 9 3/4 in) for fourth at the USA Indoors before ending up seventh at the 2012 United States Olympic Trials. She rebounded in 2013 with a new best of 4.75 m (15 ft 7 in) at the 2013 USA Indoor Track and Field Championships. However, this was overshadowed by Suhr's world record of 5.02 m (16 ft 5 1/2 in). That June she set an outdoor best of 4.70 m (15 ft 5 in) and was runner-up to Suhr at the 2013 USA Outdoor Track and Field Championships. Returning to international competition, she failed to record a valid mark at the 2013 World Championships in Athletics.

Hutson competed frequently on the professional circuit in 2014, but her performances declined a little, as she was third nationally indoors and sixth outdoors. After missing much of the 2015 season, she returned in 2016 and showed returned form with a vault of 4.66 m (15 ft 3 1/4 in) in May.

== International competitions ==
Year	Competition	Venue	Position	Event	Notes
2011	World Championships	Daegu, South Korea	15th (q)	Pole vault	4.50 m
2013	World Championships	Moscow, Russia	—	Pole vault	NM

== National titles ==
- USA Outdoor Track and Field Championships
  - Pole vault: 2011
- NCAA Women's Division I Outdoor Track and Field Championships
  - Pole vault: 2009, 2010
- NCAA Women's Division I Indoor Track and Field Championships
  - Pole vault: 2009, 2010

== See also ==
- List of pole vault national champions (women)
