= Matt Scherer =

American middle distance runner (1983–2021)

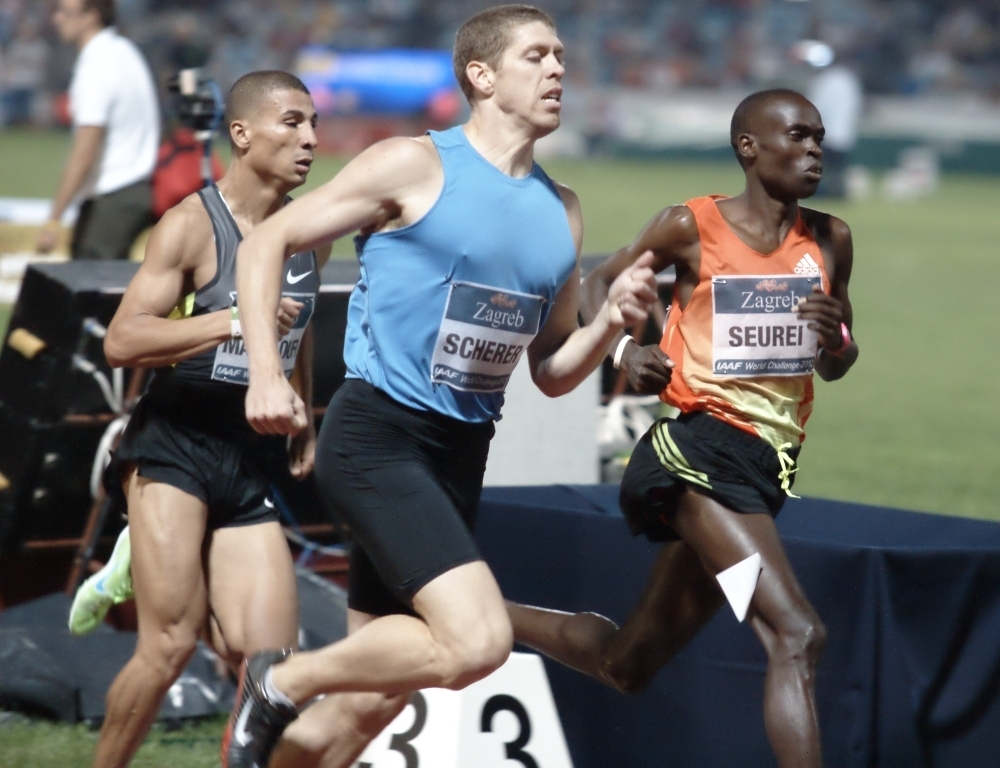

Matt Scherer (November 21, 1983 – December 7, 2021) was an American track and field athlete and a top professional pacemaker.

== High school career ==
Scherer competed for Red Hill High School in Bridgeport, Illinois, from 1999 through 2002. His senior year he scored 28 individual points at the Illinois High School Association State Championship meet, which placed his school 3rd in the team standings.

== College career ==
Scherer attended the University of Oregon from 2003 to 2006 where he studied Business and was a 9-time All-American. In 2005 he ran the anchor leg of the 3rd place 4 × 400 m relay team at the NCAA Championship meet, finishing in a time of 3:00.81 which was ranked #7 all-time in NCAA Championship Meet History. He won the Pac-10 championship in the 400 m in 2006 in 45.19.

== Professional career ==
Oregon Track Club

Ran the 400 meter leg of the American Record setting indoor distance medley relay on February 12, 2010.

Ran 1:14.41 in the 600 m on June 15, 2008, the 8th fastest time ever run

== Personal life ==
It was announced on December 8, 2021, that Scherer died that week, at the age of 38, as per a statement by RunnerSpace where he worked as the Chief Operating Officer.

== Pacing career ==
Began pacing full-time in 2011 and paced for many of the top 800 m and 1500 m runners in the world.
This table lists the records he paced:

Date	Name	Nationality	Event	Time	Record	Competition	Ref
3 July 2010	Abubaker Kaki	Sudan	1000 m	2:13.62	Sudanese National Record; USA Area Record	Prefontaine Classic	
19 February 2011	Musaeb Abdulrahman Balla	Qatar	1000 m	2:21.71	Qatari National Indoor Record	Birmingham Indoor Grand Prix	
18 February 2012	Mohammed Aman	Ethiopia	800 m	1:45.40	Ethiopian National Indoor Record	XL Galan	
29 April 2012	Henrik Ingebrigtsen	Norway	1500 m	3:36.39	Norwegian National Record	Payton Jordan Invitational	
16 May 2012	Mohammed Aman	Ethiopia	800 m	1:43.51	Korean Area Record	Colorful Daegu Championships Meeting	
9 June 2012	David Rudisha	Kenya	800 m	1:41.74	USA Area Record	adidas Grand Prix	
14 July 2012	Abraham Kipchirchir Rotich	Kenya	800 m	1:43.15	Kenyan National Junior Record	KBC Night of Athletics	
20 July 2012	Abraham Kipchirchir Rotich	Kenya	800 m	1:43.15	Kenyan National Junior Record	Herculis	
20 July 2012	Kevin López	Spain	800 m	1:43.74	Spanish National Record	Herculis	
20 August 2012	Nate Brannen	Canada	1000 m	2:16.52	Canadian National Record	Gugl Games	
20 August 2012	Mohamed Al-Garni	Qatar	1000 m	2:17.32	Qatari National Record	Gugl Games	
21 February 2013	Mohammed Aman	Ethiopia	800 m	1:45.05	Ethiopian National Indoor Record	DN Galan	

== Personal bests ==
- 200 m - 20.89 - 5/13/2006
- 300 m - 32.77 - 8/8/2006
- 400 m - 45.19 - 5/14/2006
- 400 m Hurdles - 53.21 - 2003
- 600 m - 1:14.41 - 6/15/2008
- 800 m - 1:46.11 - 6/8/2008
