= Julius Mutekanga =

Ugandan middle-distance runner

Julius Mutekanga (born 1 December 1987 in Fort Portal, Uganda) is a Ugandan middle-distance running athlete specializing in the 800 metres event.

Mutekanga was born in Bulera, Uganda. He lives in New York City, where he is completing his studies and serving as a coach at St. Bernard's School, an all boys elementary & middle school on the Upper East Side of Manhattan. On January 21, 2012 Julius qualified for the IAAF World Indoor Championship in the 800 metres. He currently competes for the Central Park Track Club New Balance. His qualifying time at the New Balance Games at the Armory was 1:48.00. For times in the year 2012, his time is in the top ten. He qualified for the World Indoor Championships, which took place on March 9, 2012 in Istanbul, Turkey. He currently is a track and field coach at St. Bernard's School.

He represented his country at the 2012 London Olympics and the 2011 World Championships in Athletics. He started up a not for profit charity Organisation in Uganda to help the youth through sports and education. This was a way of giving back to the community and thanking God for his great achievements. The name of his Charity is Empower Youth Corp. (EYC) www.eycug.org.

== Personal bests ==
| Location | Performance | Wind | Place | Date |
|---|---|---|---|---|
| Outdoor | 800 Meters | 1:46.30 | Ninove | 06/08/2011 |
| Indoor | 500 Meters | 1:01.26 | Boston (BU), MA | 08/03/2008 |
| Indoor | 800 Meters | 1:49.26 | Boston (BU), MA | 05/03/2011 |
