= Lacy Janson =

American pole vaulter (born 1983)

Personal information
- Born: February 20, 1983 (age 43) Norfolk, Virginia
- Height: 1.78 m (5 ft 10 in)
- Weight: 66 kg (146 lb)
- Spouse: Warren Harper 2012

Sport
- Country: United States
- Sport: Athletics
- Event: Pole Vault

Achievements and titles
- Personal best: 15 ft 3 1/2 in
- Updated on 6 August 2012

Lacy Janson (born February 20, 1983) is an American track and field athlete who specialized in the pole vault. She was the 2010 USA indoor champion in the event and represented her country at the 2010 IAAF World Indoor Championships. At college level, she won both an outdoor and an indoor NCAA title for Florida State University.

== Career ==
Born in Norfolk, Virginia, she attended Cardinal Mooney High School in Sarasota, Florida. She was the 2001 United States high school champion in the pole vault and went on to win the gold medal at the Pan American Junior Championships in Athletics that year. She was the 2002 USA Junior Champion in the pole vault and reached the final of the 2002 World Junior Championships in Athletics, although she failed to record a height in the last round.

She joined Florida State University in 2002 and, representing the FSU Seminoles, she won NCAA All-American honours indoors and out that year. She also broke the Atlantic Coast Conference (ACC) pole vault records at the indoor and outdoor championships. Janson repeated the ACC double in 2003 and took her first major college title at the NCAA Women's Indoor Track and Field Championship. She gained two further NCAA All-American honours in 2004 and 2005. In her final year at FSU she was the runner-up at the NCAA Indoor meet and became the 2006 ACC Outdoor champion with a personal record vault of 4.58 meters. She won the NCAA Outdoor title later that season, defeating Chelsea Johnson on countback.

Upon graduation, she began to compete as a professional and in her first year she was the runner-up at the 2007 USA Indoor Track and Field Championships and won the bronze medal at the USA Outdoor Track and Field Championships. She improved her best that year to 4.60 m, which ranked her as the second best American in the discipline that year after Jenn Stuczynski. Janson had less success the following year, finishing just outside the medal at the indoor nationals and placing tenth at the 2008 Olympic Trials.

Her progress stalled in the 2009 season – she was eighth at the USA Outdoors and her best that year came at the Sparkassen Cup in February, where she cleared 4.50 m. In spite of this, the following year proved to be a big step forward in her career. She took her first national title in 2010, winning at the USA Indoor Championships. She also cleared a new career best height of 4.66 m in February that year at the Tyson Invitational – a mark which ranked her in the top ten women vaulters that year. This led to her making her global debut at the 2010 IAAF World Indoor Championships. Her first appearance was disappointing, however, as she took three attempts at 4.35 m but missed all three and finished in last place. She competed on the 2010 IAAF Diamond League circuit and her best outdoor performance that year came at the Herculis meeting, where she finished third.

In 2011, she won at the Adidas Grand Prix in New York and placed third nationally at the 2011 USA Championships. This gained her a place on the team for the 2011 World Championships, but she did not get past the qualifying stage.

In 2012, she qualified for the USA Olympic team and competed in the London Olympic Games, finishing in 15th place in the qualifying round and therefore not progressing further.
