= Travis Padgett =

American sprinter

Personal information
- Nationality: United States
- Born: December 13, 1986 (age 39) Shelby, North Carolina, U.S.
- Height: 5 ft 8 in (1.73 m)
- Weight: 180 lb (82 kg)

Sport
- Sport: Running
- Event(s): 100 metres, 200 metres
- College team: Clemson University

Achievements and titles
- Personal best(s): 100 m: 9.89 s (Eugene 2008); 200 m: 20.32 s (Tallahassee 2008)

Travis Padgett (born December 13, 1986) is a track and field sprint athlete who competes internationally for the United States. He was an All-American and national champion sprinter at Clemson University.

He broke the NCAA collegiate record at the 2008 US Olympic Trials qualifiers; recording a time of 9.89 seconds. This brought him into the top twenty fastest athletes in the 100 meters event, and the top ten American athletes. In the final of the Olympic Trials, Padgett recorded a wind assisted time of 9.85 s but finished in fourth position. This meant he did not qualify for the Olympic event. Padgett represented the United States at the 2008 Summer Olympics in Beijing. He competed at the 4 × 100 metres relay together with Rodney Martin, Darvis Patton and Tyson Gay. In their qualification heat they did not finish due to a mistake in the baton exchange and they were eliminated.

At the beginning of the 2009 athletics season, he decided to turn professional, leaving the collegiate system.

== Personal bests ==
Event	Time	Venue	Date
60 meters	6.56 seconds	Fayetteville, Arkansas, United States	March 10, 2007
100 meters	9.89 seconds	Eugene, Oregon, United States	June 26, 2008
200 meters	20.32 seconds	Tallahassee, Florida, United States	May 31, 2008

- All information from IAAF Profile
