= NYC Grand Prix =

Athletics tournament held in New York, United States

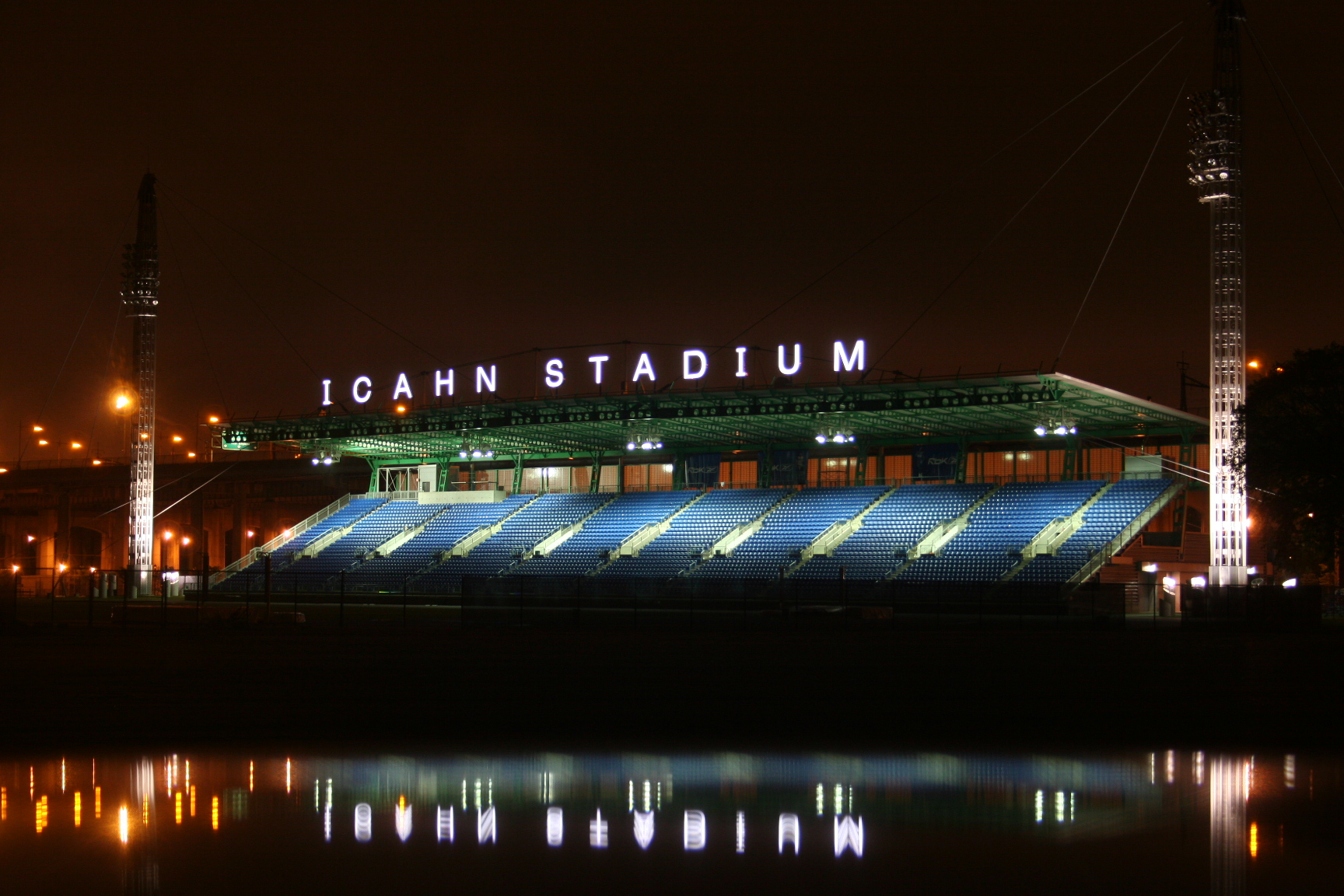
- The host stadium – Icahn Stadium
- Date: May – June
- Location: New York City, New York, United States
- Event type: Track and field
- Established: 11 June 2005
- Website: nycgrandprix.com

The USATF New York Grand Prix is an annual athletics meeting held at Icahn Stadium in New York City, New York, United States.

The event was part of the IAAF Grand Prix from 2007 to 2009. For 2010 it was promoted to the top-level Diamond League through 2015. It was known as the Reebok Grand Prix, and the Adidas Grand Prix until 2015.

For the 2016 Diamond League, the New York meet was replaced by Rabat, Morocco. Local organizers the same day said they would announce plans to carry on the meet as a street event in New York. The meeting was eventually replaced in 2016 by the Adidas Boost Boston Games.

After a six-year hiatus, the meet returned in 2022 under its current name as a World Athletics Continental Tour Gold meet. The meeting in 2025 was cancelled, and replaced in 2026, by the 2026 USATF Outdoor and Para National Championships from July 23-26.

== Editions ==
NYC Grand Prix editions
Ed.	Meeting	Series	Date	Ref.
1st	2005 New York Grand Prix		11 Jun 2005	
2nd	2006 New York Grand Prix		3 Jun 2006	
3rd	2007 New York Grand Prix	2007 IAAF Grand Prix	2 Jun 2007	
4th	2008 New York Grand Prix	2008 IAAF Grand Prix	31 May 2008	
5th	2009 New York Grand Prix	2009 IAAF Grand Prix	30 May 2009	
6th	2010 New York Grand Prix	2010 Diamond League	12 Jun 2010	
7th	2011 New York Grand Prix	2011 Diamond League	11 Jun 2011	
8th	2012 New York Grand Prix	2012 Diamond League	9 Jun 2012	
9th	2013 New York Grand Prix	2013 Diamond League	25 May 2013	
10th	2014 New York Grand Prix	2014 Diamond League	14 Jun 2014	
11th	2015 New York Grand Prix	2015 Diamond League	13 Jun 2015	
12th	2022 New York Grand Prix	2022 World Athletics Continental Tour	12 Jun 2022	
13th	2023 New York Grand Prix	2023 World Athletics Continental Tour	24 Jun 2023	
14th	2024 New York Grand Prix	2024 World Athletics Continental Tour	8–9 Jun 2024	

== World records ==
Over the course of its history, two world records have been set at the Adidas Grand Prix.

World records set at the Adidas Grand Prix
Year	Event	Record	Athlete	Nationality
2006	5000 m	14:24.53	Meseret Defar	Ethiopia
2008	100 m	9.72 (+1.7 m/s)	Usain Bolt	Jamaica

== Meeting records ==
=== Men ===
Men's meeting records of the NYC Grand Prix
Event	Record	Athlete	Nationality	Date	Meet	Ref.
100 m	9.72 (+1.7 m/s)	Usain Bolt	Jamaica	31 May 2008	2008	
200 m	19.58 (+1.3 m/s)	Tyson Gay	United States	30 May 2009	2009	
400 m	44.19	LaShawn Merritt	United States	14 June 2014	2014	
800 m	1:41.74	David Rudisha	Kenya	9 June 2012	2012	
1000 m	2:16.94	Alex Kipchirchir	Kenya	11 June 2005	2005	
1500 m	3:33.29	Nicholas Kemboi	Kenya	12 June 2010	2010	
Mile	3:52.84	Alan Webb	United States	2 June 2007	2007	
3000 m	7:39.48	Gebregziabher Gebremariam	Ethiopia	11 June 2005	2005	
5000 m	13:02.90	Micah Kogo	Kenya	30 May 2009	2009	
110 m hurdles	12.84 (+1.6 m/s)	Devon Allen	United States	12 June 2022	2022	
400 m hurdles	47.86	Kerron Clement	United States	12 June 2010	2010	
3000 m steeplechase	8:01.85	Paul Kipsiele Koech	Kenya	31 May 2008	2008	
Pole vault	5.85 m	Renaud Lavillenie	France	12 June 2010	2010	
High jump	2.42 m	Bohdan Bondarenko	Ukraine	14 June 2014	2014	
High jump	2.42 m	Mutaz Essa Barshim	Qatar	14 June 2014	2014	
Long jump	8.33 m (+1.6 m/s)	Jeff Henderson	United States	14 June 2014	2014	
Triple jump	17.98 m (+1.2 m/s)	Teddy Tamgho	France	12 June 2010	2010	
Shot put	21.68 m	Christian Cantwell	United States	3 June 2006	2006	
Discus throw	68.24 m	Robert Harting	Germany	14 June 2014	2014	
Hammer throw	78.70 m	Rudy Winkler	United States	24 June 2023	2023	
Javelin throw	87.02 m	Andreas Thorkildsen	Norway	12 June 2010	2010	
4 × 400 m relay	3:04.72	Executive TC	United States	30 May 2009	2009	

=== Women ===
Women's meeting records of the NYC Grand Prix
Event	Record	Athlete	Nationality	Date	Meet	Ref.
100 m	10.83 (+0.9 m/s)	Aleia Hobbs	United States	12 June 2022	2022	
200 m	21.98 (+1.4 m/s)	Veronica Campbell-Brown	Jamaica	12 June 2010	2010	
400 m	48.75	Sydney McLaughlin-Levrone	United States	9 June 2024	2024	
800 m	1:57.48	Fantu Magiso	Ethiopia	9 June 2012	2012	
1000 m	2:37.42	Erin Donohue	United States	13 June 2015	2015	
1500 m	4:00.13	Abeba Aregawi	Sweden	14 June 2014	2014	
Mile	4:39.17	Wesley Frazier	United States	25 May 2013	2013	
3000 m	8:33.57	Meseret Defar	Ethiopia	11 June 2005	2005	
5000 m	14:24.53	Meseret Defar	Ethiopia	3 June 2006	2006	
100 m hurdles	12.40 (+2.0 m/s)	Alaysha Johnson	United States	12 June 2022	2022	
400 m hurdles	54.35	Gianna Woodruff	Panama	12 June 2022	2022	
3000 m steeplechase	9:18.58	Sofia Assefa	Ethiopia	14 June 2014	2014	
High jump	1.97 m	Ruth Beitia	Spain	13 June 2015	2015	
High jump	1.97 m	Blanka Vlašić	Croatia	13 June 2015	2015	
Pole vault	4.88 m	Jennifer Suhr	United States	2 June 2007	2007	
Long jump	7.14 m (−0.9 m/s)	Tara Davis-Woodhall	United States	9 June 2024	2024	
Triple jump	14.71 m (−0.9 m/s)	Olga Rypakova	Kazakhstan	9 June 2012	2012	
Shot put	20.60 m	Valerie Adams	New Zealand	9 June 2012	2012	
Discus throw	68.48 m	Sandra Perković	Croatia	25 May 2013	2013	
Hammer throw	71.11 m	Anette Echikunwoke	United States	24 June 2023	2023	
Hammer throw	71.11 m	Jillian Shippee	United States	24 June 2023	2023	
Javelin throw	69.35 m	Sunette Viljoen	South Africa	9 June 2012	2012	
4 × 400 m relay	3:40.85	Queens	United States	12 June 2010	2010	
