= Kimarra McDonald =

Jamaican middle-distance runner

Personal information
- Nationality: Jamaican
- Born: 14 August 1987 (age 38)

Sport
- Sport: Middle-distance running
- Event: 800 metres

Kimarra McDonald (born 14 August 1987) is a Jamaican middle-distance runner. She competed in the women's 800 metres at the 2017 World Championships in Athletics.

McDonald competed for the Tennessee Volunteers track and field team in the NCAA.
