= Michael Rutt =

American middle-distance runner

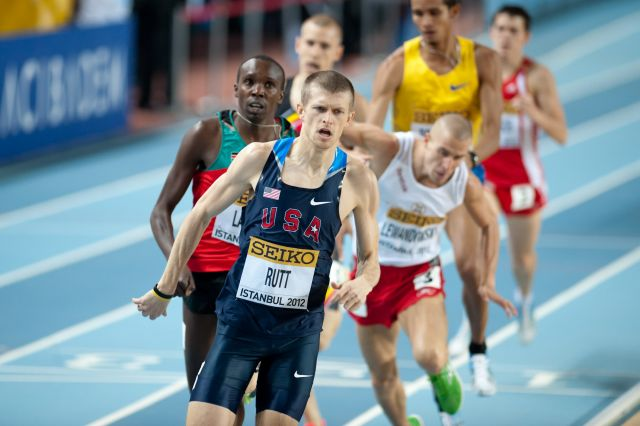
Michael Rutt at the 2012 IAAF World Indoor Championships

Michael Rutt (born October 28, 1987) is an American middle-distance runner. In August 2014, Michael was hired as the assistant Track and Field Coach at The College of New Jersey. In August 2016, Michael left TCNJ to join the University Massachusetts-Lowell Track and Field Team as the assistant Track and Field Coach.

Rutt competed for the UConn Huskies track and field team in the NCAA.

== Achievements ==
Year	Competition	Venue	Position	Event	Notes
Representing United States
2012	World Indoor Championships	Istanbul, Turkey	6th	800 m	1:51.47
2014	World Relay Championships	Nassau, Bahamas	3rd	4 × 800 m relay	7:09.06
