= 2015 Diamond League =

2015 IAAF Diamond League
- Edition: 6th
- Dates: 15 May – 11 September
- Events: 32
- Meetings: 14

The 2015 IAAF Diamond League was the sixth season of the annual series of outdoor track and field meetings, organised by the International Association of Athletics Federations (IAAF). It consisted of fourteen one-day meetings, starting on 15 May in Doha, Qatar, and ending on 11 September in Brussels, Belgium. Other events were held in Shanghai, Eugene, Rome, Birmingham, Oslo, New York City, Paris, Lausanne, Fontvieille, Monaco, London, Stockholm, and Zürich. All previous venues remained on the tour, with the exception that London returned to host the second meeting in the United Kingdom, having been replaced by Glasgow during the 2014 IAAF Diamond League.

== Schedule ==
The following fourteen meetings were included in the 2015 season:

Date	Meet	Stadium	City	Country
15 May	Qatar Athletic Super Grand Prix	Qatar SC Stadium	Doha	Qatar
17 May	Shanghai Golden Grand Prix	Shanghai Stadium	Shanghai	China
30 May	Prefontaine Classic	Hayward Field	Eugene	United States
4 June	Golden Gala – Pietro Mennea	Stadio Olimpico	Rome	Italy
7 June	British Athletics Grand Prix	Alexander Stadium	Birmingham	United Kingdom
11 June	Bislett Games	Bislett Stadion	Oslo	Norway
13 June	Adidas Grand Prix	Icahn Stadium	New York City	United States
4 July	Meeting Areva	Stade de France	Saint-Denis	France
9 July	Athletissima	Stade Olympique de la Pontaise	Lausanne	Switzerland
17 July	Herculis	Stade Louis II	Fontvieille	Monaco
24 & 25 July	Sainsburys Anniversary Games	Stadium at Queen Elizabeth Olympic Park	London	United Kingdom
30 July	Bauhausgalan	Stockholm Olympic Stadium	Stockholm	Sweden
3 September	Weltklasse Zürich	Letzigrund	Zürich	Switzerland
11 September	Memorial Van Damme	King Baudouin Stadium	Brussels	Belgium

== Events ==
There are 16 men's and 16 women's disciplines in the Diamond League and seven events per discipline in the season. The total prize money for each competition is US$30,000, with a winner's share of $10,000. The season winner of each discipline wins US$40,000.

Track	Field
100 m; 200 m; 400 m; 800 m; 1500 m / Mile; 5000 m / 3000 m; 110 m hurdles (men); 100 m hurdles (women); 400 m hurdles; 3000 m steeplechase	Pole vault; High jump; Long jump; Triple jump; Shot put; Discus throw; Javelin throw

== Winners ==
Events not included in the Diamond League are marked in grey background.

=== Men ===
==== Track ====
#	Meeting	100 m	200 m	400 m	800 m	1500 m	5000 m	110 m h	400 m h	3000 m st
1	Doha	Justin Gatlin (USA) 9.74 WL, MR	–	Abdalelah Haroun (QAT) 44.85	Ayanleh Souleiman (DJI) 1:43.78 WL	–	Hagos Gebrhiwet (ETH) 7:38.08 WL (3000m)	–	Bershawn Jackson (USA) 48.09 WL, MR	–
2	Shanghai	–	Alonso Edward (PAN) 20.33 SB	Kirani James (GRN) 44.66	–	Silas Kiplagat (KEN) 3:35.29 WL	-	David Oliver (USA) 13.17 SB	–	Jairus Birech (KEN) 8:05.36 WL
3	Eugene	–	Justin Gatlin (USA) 19.68 WL	Kirani James (GRN) 43.95 WL	–	Ayanleh Souleiman (DJI) 3:51.10 WL (1 Mile)	–	Pascal Martinot-Lagarde (FRA) 13.06 WL	Johnny Dutch (USA) 48.20 SB	Ezekiel Kemboi (KEN) 8:01.71 WL
4	Rome	Justin Gatlin (USA) 9.75 MR	Lykourgos-Stefanos Tsakonas (GRE) 20.09	–	Mohammed Aman (ETH) 1:43.56 WL	–	Yomif Kejelcha (ETH) 12:58.39 WL	–	Johnny Dutch (USA) 48.13	–
5	Birmingham	Marvin Bracy (USA) 9.93	–	–	Nijel Amos (BOT) 1:46.77	–	Thomas Pkemei Longosiwa (KEN) 13:07.26	–	–	–
6	Oslo	–	Christophe Lemaitre (FRA) 20.21 SB	Steven Gardiner (BAH) 44.64	–	Asbel Kiprop (KEN) 3:51.45 (1 Mile)	–	–	–	Jairus Birech (KEN) 8:05.63
7	New York	Tyson Gay (USA) 10.12	Usain Bolt (JAM) 20.29	–	David Rudisha (KEN) 1:43.58 SB	–	Ben True (USA) 13:29.48	David Oliver (USA) 13.19	Javier Culson (PUR) 48.48 SB	–
8	Paris	Asafa Powell (JAM) 9.81	–	Wayde van Niekerk (RSA) 43.96 AR	–	Silas Kiplagat (KEN) 3:30.12 WL	–	Orlando Ortega (CUB) 12.94 WL	–	Jairus Birech (KEN) 7:58.83 MR WL
9	Lausanne	Justin Gatlin (USA) 9.75	Zharnel Hughes (GBR) 20.13	–	Nijel Amos (BOT) 1:43.27	–	Mo Farah (GBR) 13:11.77	–	Bershawn Jackson (USA) 48.71	–
10	Monaco	Justin Gatlin (USA) 9.78	–	–	Amel Tuka (BIH) 1:42.51 WL, NR	Asbel Kiprop (KEN) 3:26.69 WL	Caleb Ndiku (KEN) 7:35.13 WL (3000 m)	–	Bershawn Jackson (USA) 48.23	–
11	London	Usain Bolt (JAM) 9.87	Zharnel Hughes (GBR) 20.05 PB	Wayde van Niekerk (RSA) 44.63	Nijel Amos (BOT) 1:44.57	Asbel Kiprop (KEN) 3:54.87 (mile)	Mo Farah (GBR) 7:34.66 WL (3000 m)	Jason Richardson (USA) 13.19	Michael Tinsley (USA) 49.02	Conseslus Kipruto (KEN) 8:09.47
12	Stockholm	–	Alonso Edward (PAN) 20.04	Machel Cedenio (TTO) 44.97	–	Ayanleh Souleiman (DJI) 3:33.33	–	Orlando Ortega (CUB) 13.18	–	Hicham Sigueni (MAR) 8:16.54 PB
13	Zürich	–	Alonso Edward (PAN) 20.03	LaShawn Merritt (USA) 44.18	–	Asbel Kiprop (KEN) 3:35.79	–	Sergey Shubenkov (RUS) 13.14	–	Paul Kipsiele Koech (KEN) 8:10.24 SB
14	Brussels	Justin Gatlin (USA) 9.98	–	–	Adam Kszczot (POL) 1:45.12	–	Yomif Kejelcha (ETH) 12:53.98 WL	–	Jeffrey Gibson (BAH) 48.72	–
Overall winner		Justin Gatlin (USA)	Alonso Edward (PAN)	Kirani James (GRN)	Nijel Amos (BOT)	Asbel Kiprop (KEN)	Yomif Kejelcha (ETH)	David Oliver (USA)	Bershawn Jackson (USA)	Jairus Birech (KEN)

==== Field ====
#	Meeting	Long jump	Triple jump	High jump	Pole vault	Shot put	Discus	Javelin
1	Doha	–	Pedro Pablo Pichardo (CUB) 18.06 WL, DLR, MR	–	Konstantinos Filippidis (GRE) 5.75 SB	David Storl (GER) 21.51	–	Tero Pitkämäki (FIN) 88.62 WL
2	Shanghai	Aleksandr Menkov (RUS) 8.27	–	Mutaz Essa Barshim (QAT) 2.38 WL, MR	–	–	Piotr Małachowski (POL) 64.65	–
3	Eugene	–	–	Mutaz Essa Barshim (QAT) 2.41 WL	Renaud Lavillenie (FRA) 6.05 WL	Joe Kovacs (USA) 22.12	Piotr Małachowski (POL) 65.59	–
4	Rome	–	Pedro Pablo Pichardo (CUB) 17.96 MR	–	Renaud Lavillenie (FRA) 5.91	David Storl (GER) 21.46	–	Vítězslav Veselý (CZE) 88.14
5	Birmingham	Greg Rutherford (GBR) 8.35 SB	Christian Taylor (USA) 17.40	–	–	–	–	Julius Yego (KEN) 91.39 AR, WL, DLR
6	Oslo	Greg Rutherford (GBR) 8.25	–	Zhang Guowei (CHN) 2.36	–	–	Robert Urbanek (POL) 63.85	–
7	New York	–	Pedro Pablo Pichardo (CUB) 17.56	–	–	Joe Kovacs (USA) 21.67	–	Vítězslav Veselý (CZE) 83.62
8	Paris	Michael Hartfield (USA) 8.19	–	Daniil Tsyplakov (RUS) 2.32	Konstantinos Filippidis (GRE) 5.91 NR	–	Piotr Małachowski (POL) 65.57	–
9	Lausanne	–	Christian Taylor (USA) 18.06 =DLR, MR	–	Pawel Wojciechowski (POL) 5.84	David Storl (GER) 22.20 MR	–	Keshorn Walcott (TTO) 90.16
10	Monaco	–	Christian Taylor (USA) 17.75 MR	–	Renaud Lavillenie (FRA) 5.92	Joe Kovacs (USA) 22.56 WL, DLR	–	Tero Pitkämäki (FIN) 88.87
11	London	Marquis Dendy (USA) 8.38	–	Marco Fassinotti (ITA) 2.31	Renaud Lavillenie (FRA) 6.03 MR	–	Philip Milanov (BEL) 65.14	–
12	Stockholm	Greg Rutherford (GBR) 8.34	–	JaCorian Duffield (USA) 2.32	–	–	Piotr Małachowski (POL) 65.95 SB	–
13	Zürich	Greg Rutherford (GBR) 8.32	–	Mutaz Essa Barshim (QAT) 2.32	Shawnacy Barber (CAN) 5.92 NR	–	Robert Urbanek (POL) 65.78	–
14	Brussels	–	Christian Taylor (USA) 17.59	–	Renaud Lavillenie (FRA) 5.95	Tomas Walsh (NZL) 21.39	–	Tero Pitkämäki (FIN) 87.37
Overall winner		Greg Rutherford (GBR)	Christian Taylor (USA)	Mutaz Essa Barshim (QAT)	Renaud Lavillenie (FRA)	Joe Kovacs (USA)	Piotr Małachowski (POL)	Tero Pitkämäki (FIN)

=== Women ===
==== Track ====
#	Meeting	100 m	200 m	400 m	800 m	1500 m	5000 m	100 m h	400 m h	3000 m st
1	Doha	–	Allyson Felix (USA) 21.98 WL, =DLR, MR	Francena McCorory (USA) 50.21	–	Dawit Seyaum (ETH) 4:00.96 WL	–	Jasmin Stowers (USA) 12.35 WL, DLR, MR	–	Virginia Nyambura (KEN) 9:21.51 WL
2	Shanghai	Blessing Okagbare (NGR) 10.98 SB	–	–	Eunice Sum (KEN) 2:00.28	–	Almaz Ayana (ETH) 14:14.32 WL, DLR, MR	–	Kaliese Spencer (JAM) 54.71 WL	–
3	Eugene	Shelly-Ann Fraser-Pryce (JAM) 10.81 WL	–	–	Eunice Sum (KEN) 1:57.82 WL	–	Genzebe Dibaba (ETH) 14:19.76	–	–	–
4	Rome	–	Jeneba Tarmoh (USA) 22.77	Francena McCorory (USA) 50.36	–	Jenny Simpson (USA) 3:59.31 WL	–	Sharika Nelvis (USA) 12.52	–	Hyvin Jepkemoi (KEN) 9:15.08 WL
5	Birmingham	–	Jeneba Tarmoh (USA) 22.29 SB	Stephenie Ann McPherson (JAM) 52.14	–	Sifan Hassan (NED) 4:00.30	–	Dawn Harper-Nelson (USA) 12.58 SB	Kaliese Spencer (JAM) 54.45 SB	Virginia Nyambura (KEN) 9:24.01
6	Oslo	Murielle Ahouré (CIV) 11.03	–	–	–	Laura Muir (GBR) 4:00.39 SB	Genzebe Dibaba (ETH) 14:21.29	Jasmin Stowers (USA) 12.84	Kaliese Spencer (JAM) 54.15 WL	–
7	New York	–	Tori Bowie (USA) 22.23 SB	Francena McCorory (USA) 49.86 WL, MR	Ajeé Wilson (USA) 1:58.83	–	–	–	–	Hiwot Ayalew (ETH) 9:25.26
8	Paris	Shelly-Ann Fraser-Pryce (JAM) 10.74 MR WL	–	–	Eunice Sum (KEN) 1:56.99 WL	–	Genzebe Dibaba (ETH) 14:15.21 MR	–	Zuzana Hejnová (CZE) 53.76	–
9	Lausanne	–	Allyson Felix (USA) 22.09	Shaunae Miller (BAH) 49.92	–	Sifan Hassan (NED) 4:02.36	–	Dawn Harper-Nelson (USA) 12.55	Sara Petersen (DEN) 55.01	Virginia Nyambura (KEN) 9:16.99 MR
10	Monaco	–	Candyce McGrone (USA) 22.08 PB	Francena McCorory (USA) 49.83 WL	–	Genzebe Dibaba (ETH) 3:50.07 WR	–	Sharika Nelvis (USA) 12.46	–	Habiba Ghribi (TUN) 9:11.28 WL, MR
11	London	Dafne Schippers (NED) 10.92 NR	Elaine Thompson (JAM) 22.10 MR	Natasha Hastings (USA) 50.24 SB	Eunice Sum (KEN) 1:58.44	Laura Weightman (GBR) 4:06.09	Mercy Cherono (KEN) 14:54.81	Jasmin Stowers (USA) 12.47 MR	Zuzana Hejnová (CZE) 53.99	–
12	Stockholm	Shelly-Ann Fraser-Pryce (JAM) 10.93	–	–	Rénelle Lamote (FRA) 1:59.91	–	Katie Mackey (USA) 8:52.99 PB (3000 m)	–	Zuzana Hejnová (CZE) 54.37	–
13	Zürich	Shelly-Ann Fraser-Pryce (JAM) 10.93	–	–	Eunice Sum (KEN) 1:59.14	–	Almaz Ayana (ETH) 8:22.34 MR (3000 m)	–	Zuzana Hejnová (CZE) 54.74	–
14	Brussels	–	Dafne Schippers (NED) 22.12	Shaunae Miller (BAH) 50.48	–	Faith Kipyegon (KEN) 4:16.71 AR, WL (1 mile)	–	Dawn Harper-Nelson (USA) 12.63	–	Habiba Ghribi (TUN) 9:05.36 WL, AR
Overall winner		Shelly-Ann Fraser-Pryce (JAM)	Allyson Felix (USA)	Francena McCorory (USA)	Eunice Sum (KEN)	Sifan Hassan (NED)	Genzebe Dibaba (ETH)	Dawn Harper-Nelson (USA)	Zuzana Hejnová (CZE)	Virginia Nyambura (KEN)

==== Field ====
#	Meeting	Long jump	Triple jump	High jump	Pole vault	Shot put	Discus	Javelin
1	Doha	Tianna Bartoletta (USA) 6.99 WL	–	Airinė Palšytė (LTU) 1.94	–	–	Sandra Perković (CRO) 68.10	–
2	Shanghai	–	Caterine Ibargüen (COL) 14.85	–	Nikoleta Kyriakopoulou (GRE) 4.75 WL, NR	Gong Lijiao (CHN) 20.23 WL	–	Lü Huihui (CHN) 64.08 MR
3	Eugene	Tianna Bartoletta (USA) 7.11	Caterine Ibargüen (COL) 15.18	–	–	–	–	Christina Obergföll (GER) 63.07 SB
4	Rome	Darya Klishina (RUS) 6.89	–	Ruth Beitia (ESP) 2.00 WL	–	–	Sandra Perković (CRO) 67.92	–
5	Birmingham	–	–	Kamila Lićwinko (POL) 1.97 =SB	Fabiana Murer (BRA) 4.72 SB	Christina Schwanitz (GER) 19.68	Sandra Perković (CRO) 69.23 MR	–
6	Oslo	–	Caterine Ibargüen (COL) 14.68	–	–	Christina Schwanitz (GER) 20.14	–	Marharyta Dorozhon (ISR) 64.56 NR
7	New York	Christabel Nettey (CAN) 6.92 MR	–	Ruth Beitia (ESP) 1.97 MR	Fabiana Murer (BRA) 4.80 SB	–	Sandra Perković (CRO) 68.44	–
8	Paris	–	Caterine Ibargüen (COL) 14.87	–	Nikoleta Kyriakopoulou (GRE) 4.83 =DLR NR WL	Christina Schwanitz (GER) 20.31	–	Barbora Špotáková (CZE) 64.42
9	Lausanne	Tianna Bartoletta (USA) 6.86	–	Anna Chicherova (RUS) 2.03 WL	–	–	Yaimí Pérez (CUB) 67.13	–
10	Monaco	Ivana Španović (SRB) 6.87	–	Mariya Kuchina (RUS) 2.00 =PB	–	–	Sandra Perković (CRO) 66.80	–
11	London	Shara Proctor (GBR) 6.98 NR	Olga Rypakova (KAZ) 14.33	–	Nikoleta Kyriakopoulou (GRE) 4.79	Michelle Carter (USA) 19.74 | –	Madara Palameika (LAT) 65.01 SB	
12	Stockholm	–	Caterine Ibargüen (COL) 14.69	–	Yarisley Silva (CUB) 4.81	Christina Schwanitz (GER) 20.13	–	Barbora Špotáková (CZE) 65.66 SB
13	Zürich	Ivana Španović (SRB) 7.02 NR	–	–	Nikoleta Kyriakopoulou (GRE) 4.77	Christina Schwanitz (GER) 19.91	–	Barbora Špotáková (CZE) 64.31
14	Brussels	–	Caterine Ibargüen (COL) 14.60	Mariya Kuchina (RUS) 2.01 =PB	–	–	Sandra Perković (CRO) 67.50	–
Overall winner		Tianna Bartoletta (USA)	Caterine Ibargüen (COL)	Ruth Beitia (ESP)	Nikoleta Kyriakopoulou (GRE)	Christina Schwanitz (GER)	Sandra Perković (CRO)	Barbora Špotáková (CZE)

== Results ==
Doha
Event	1st +4 pts	2nd +2 pts	3rd +1 pts	4th ⠀	5th ⠀	6th ⠀	7th ⠀	8th ⠀
Men's 100m (+0.9 m/s)	Justin Gatlin; USA | 9.74	Michael Rodgers; USA | 9.96	Keston Bledman; TTO | 10.01	Kim Collins; SKN | 10.03	Femi Ogunode; QAT | 10.04	Nesta Carter; JAM | 10.07	Diondre Batson; USA | 10.10	James Dasaolu; GBR | 10.14
Men's 800m	Ayanleh Souleiman; DJI | 1:43.78	Ferguson Cheruiyot Rotich; KEN | 1:44.53	Alfred Kipketer; KEN | 1:44.59	Pierre-Ambroise Bosse; FRA | 1:44.95	Asbel Kiprop; KEN | 1:45.11	Job Kinyor; KEN | 1:45.12	Jeremiah Kipkorir Mutai; KEN | 1:45.50	Musaeb Abdulrahman Balla; QAT | 1:46.14
Men's 3000m	Hagos Gebrhiwet; ETH | 7:38.08	Mo Farah; GBR | 7:38.22	Thomas Pkemei Longosiwa; KEN | 7:39.22	Imane Merga; ETH | 7:39.96	Yomif Kejelcha; ETH | 7:39.99	Isiah Kiplangat Koech; KEN | 7:40.39	Edwin Cheruiyot Soi; KEN | 7:41.69	Benson Seurei; BRN | 7:42.03
Men's 400mH	Bershawn Jackson; USA | 48.09	Javier Culson; PUR | 48.96	Thomas Barr; IRL | 48.99	Jack Green; GBR | 49.31	Jeffery Gibson; BAH | 49.48	LJ van Zyl; RSA | 49.52	Rasmus Mägi; EST | 49.71	Félix Sánchez; DOM | 50.93
Men's pole vault	Konstantinos Filippidis; GRE | 5.75 m	Carlo Paech; GER | 5.60 m	Germán Chiaraviglio; ARG | 5.60 m	Tobias Scherbarth; GER | 5.50 m	Piotr Lisek; POL | 5.50 m	Ilya Mudrov; RUS | 5.50 m	Raphael Holzdeppe; GER | 5.40 m	Edi Maia; POR | 5.40 m
Men's triple jump	Pedro Pichardo; CUB | 18.06 m	Christian Taylor; USA | 18.04 m	Teddy Tamgho; FRA | 17.24 m	Alexis Copello; CUB | 17.18 m	Nelson Évora; POR | 17.12 m	Tosin Oke; NGR | 16.83 m	Aleksey Fyodorov; RUS | 16.60 m	Marian Oprea; ROU | 16.36 m
Men's shot put	David Storl; GER | 21.51 m	Reese Hoffa; USA | 21.30 m	Ryan Whiting; USA | 21.06 m	Joe Kovacs; USA | 20.86 m	Asmir Kolašinac; SRB | 20.44 m	Germán Luján Lauro; ARG | 20.26 m	Borja Vivas; ESP | 19.91 m	O'Dayne Richards; JAM | 19.89 m
Men's javelin throw	Tero Pitkämäki; FIN | 88.62 m	Antti Ruuskanen; FIN | 86.61 m	Vítězslav Veselý; CZE | 83.67 m	Ihab Abdelrahman; EGY | 83.14 m	Thomas Röhler; GER | 82.79 m	Julius Yego; KEN | 81.98 m	Hamish Peacock; AUS | 81.66 m	Keshorn Walcott; TTO | 80.68 m
Women's 200m (+1.6 m/s)	Allyson Felix; USA | 21.98	Murielle Ahouré-Demps; CIV | 22.29	Anthonique Strachan; BAH | 22.69	Tiffany Townsend; USA | 22.85	Shalonda Solomon; USA | 22.91	Bianca Williams; GBR | 23.05	Charonda Williams; USA | 23.21	Kaylin Whitney; USA | 23.24
Women's 400m	Francena McCorory; USA | 50.21	Sanya Richards-Ross; USA | 50.79	Stephenie Ann McPherson; JAM | 50.93	Novlene Williams-Mills; JAM | 51.28	Natasha Hastings; USA | 51.50	Christine Day; JAM | 51.53	Kabange Mupopo; ZAM | 51.88	Libania Grenot; ITA | 52.50
Women's 1500m	Dawit Seyaum; ETH | 4:00.96	Sifan Hassan; NED | 4:01.40	Senbere Teferi; ETH | 4:01.86	Anna Mishchenko; UKR | DQ (Note: Disqualified after competition due to antidoping rule violation)	Luiza Gega; ALB | 4:02.63	Axumawit Embaye; ETH | 4:04.18	Abeba Aregawi; SWE | 4:04.42	Rababe Arafi; MAR | 4:05.11
Women's 100mH (+0.9 m/s)	Jasmin Stowers; USA | 12.35	Sharika Nelvis; USA | 12.54	Tiffany Porter; GBR | 12.65	Sally Pearson; AUS | 12.69	Queen Claye; USA | 12.72	Kristi Castlin; USA | 12.80	Tenaya Jones; USA | 12.86	Dawn Harper-Nelson; USA | 13.24
Women's 3000mSC	Virginia Nyambura; KEN | 9:21.51	Hiwot Ayalew; ETH | 9:21.54	Hyvin Kiyeng; KEN | 9:22.11	Tigest Getent Mekonen; BRN | 9:27.07	Lidya Chepkurui; KEN | 9:27.62	Madeline Heiner; AUS | 9:28.41	Sofia Assefa; ETH | 9:35.32	Daisy Jepkemei; KEN | 9:38.16
Women's high jump	Airinė Palšytė; LTU | 1.94 m	Irina Gordeyeva; RUS | 1.94 m	Isobel Pooley; GBR | 1.91 m	Ana Šimić; CRO | 1.91 m	Levern Spencer; LCA | 1.91 m	Justyna Kasprzycka; POL | 1.91 m	Ruth Beitia; ESP | 1.88 m	Svetlana Radzivil; UZB | 1.85 m
Women's long jump	Tianna Madison; USA | 6.99 m	Shara Proctor; GBR | 6.95 m	Christabel Nettey; CAN | 6.93 m	Lorraine Ugen; GBR | 6.92 m	Brittney Reese; USA | 6.76 m	Ivana Vuleta; SRB | 6.76 m	Darya Klishina; RUS | 6.75 m	Erica Jarder; SWE | 6.53 m
Women's discus throw	Sandra Perković; CRO | 68.10 m	Nadine Müller; GER | 65.13 m	Dani Stevens; AUS | 64.45 m	Yekaterina Strokova; RUS | DQ	Melina Robert-Michon; FRA | 62.45 m	Żaneta Glanc; POL | 62.15 m	Gia Lewis-Smallwood; USA | 61.98 m	Irina Rodrigues; POR | 60.35 m

Shanghai
Event	1st +4 pts	2nd +2 pts	3rd +1 pts	4th ⠀	5th ⠀	6th ⠀	7th ⠀	8th ⠀
Men's 200m (+1.1 m/s)	Alonso Edward; PAN | 20.33	Julian Forte; JAM | 20.36	Nickel Ashmeade; JAM | 20.44	Rasheed Dwyer; JAM | 20.56	Aaron Brown; CAN | 20.57	Carvin Nkanata; KEN | 20.58	Churandy Martina; NED | 20.59	Zhenye Xie; CHN | 20.65
Men's 400m	Kirani James; GRN | 44.66	Tony McQuay; USA | 45.54	LaShawn Merritt; USA | 45.58	David Verburg; USA | 45.65	Kévin Borlée; BEL | 45.74	Isaac Makwala; BOT | 46.28	Kind Butler; USA | 46.51	Renny Quow; TTO | 46.65
Men's 1500m	Silas Kiplagat; KEN | 3:35.29	Hillary Cheruiyot Ngetich; KEN | 3:35.40	Collins Cheboi; KEN | 3:35.46	Ben Blankenship; USA | 3:35.48	Robert Biwott; KEN | 3:35.75	James Kiplagat Magut; KEN | 3:35.91	Jakub Holuša; CZE | 3:35.98	Ronald Musagala; UGA | 3:36.23
Men's 110mH (+0.4 m/s)	David Oliver; USA | 13.17	Orlando Ortega; CUB | 13.19	Aries Merritt; USA | 13.25	Ronnie Ash; USA | 13.29	Sergey Shubenkov; RUS | 13.35	Wenjun Xie; CHN | 13.36	Jason Richardson; USA | 13.42	Andrew Riley; JAM | 13.71
Men's 3000mSC	Jairus Kipchoge Birech; KEN | 8:05.36	Paul Kipsiele Koech; KEN | 8:11.39	Conseslus Kipruto; KEN | 8:14.59	Jonathan Muia Ndiku; KEN | 8:15.54	Clement Kimutai Kemboi; KEN | 8:16.22	Brimin Kiprop Kipruto; KEN | 8:18.55	Hilal Yego; KEN | 8:19.87	Abel Kiprop Mutai; KEN | 8:20.38
Men's high jump	Mutaz Essa Barshim; QAT | 2.38 m	Bohdan Bondarenko; UKR | 2.32 m	Zhang Guowei; CHN | 2.32 m	Naoto Tobe; JPN | 2.29 m	Michael Mason; CAN | 2.25 m	Jesse Williams; USA | 2.25 m	Erik Kynard; USA | 2.20 m	Jaroslav Bába; CZE | 2.20 m
Men's long jump	Aleksandr Menkov; RUS | 8.27 m	Jeff Henderson; USA | 8.26 m	Wang Jianan; CHN | 8.25 m	Jinzhe Li; CHN | 8.21 m	Godfrey Khotso Mokoena; RSA | 8.11 m	Changzhou Huang; CHN | 8.06 m	Greg Rutherford; GBR | 8.05 m	Chris Tomlinson; GBR | 7.80 m
Men's discus throw	Piotr Małachowski; POL | 64.65 m	Robert Urbanek; POL | 64.47 m	Vikas Gowda; IND | 63.90 m	Martin Kupper; EST | 63.07 m	Jason Morgan; JAM | 62.26 m	Andrius Gudžius; LTU | 61.89 m	Apostolos Parellis; CYP | 61.77 m	Erik Cadée; NED | 61.25 m
Women's 100m (+0.9 m/s)	Blessing Okagbare; NGR | 10.98	Tori Bowie; USA | 11.07	Michelle-Lee Ahye; TTO | 11.13	Veronica Campbell-Brown; JAM | 11.22	Shelly-Ann Fraser-Pryce; JAM | 11.25	Muna Lee; USA | 11.48	Yongli Wei; CHN | 11.51	Schillonie Calvert-Powell; JAM | 11.53
Women's 800m	Eunice Jepkoech Sum; KEN | 2:00.28	Malika Akkaoui; MAR | 2:00.73	Janeth Jepkosgei; KEN | 2:01.14	Molly Ludlow; USA | 2:01.31	Jennifer Meadows; GBR | 2:01.37	Angelika Cichocka; POL | 2:01.64	Marina Arzamasova; BLR | 2:02.24	Lenka Masná; CZE | 2:02.64
Women's 5000m	Almaz Ayana; ETH | 14:14.32	Viola Jelagat Kibiwot; KEN | 14:40.32	Senbere Teferi; ETH | 14:41.98	Alemitu Haroye; ETH | 14:43.28	Irene Jelagat; KEN | 14:55.49	Irine Chepet Cheptai; KEN | 14:58.40	Magdalyne Masai; KEN | 14:58.54	Perine Nengampi; KEN | 15:08.39
Women's 400mH	Kaliese Carter; JAM | 54.71	Tiffany Williams; USA | 55.27	Cassandra Tate; USA | 55.68	Georganne Moline; USA | 55.89	Lashinda Demus; USA | 56.14	Kori Carter; USA | 56.47	Xia Xiao; CHN | 57.61	Bianca Baak; NED | 57.76
Women's pole vault	Nikoleta Kyriakopoulou; GRE | 4.73 m	Aikaterini Stefanidi; GRE | 4.58 m	Yarisley Silva; CUB | 4.58 m	Li Ling; CHN | 4.48 m	Alana Boyd; AUS | 4.38 m	Silke Spiegelburg; GER | 4.38 m	Mary Saxer; USA | 4.38 m	Tina Šutej; SLO | 4.38 m
Women's triple jump	Caterine Ibarguen; COL | 14.85 m	Olha Saladukha; UKR | 14.62 m	Olga Rypakova; KAZ | 14.38 m	Kristin Gierisch; GER | 14.15 m	Patrícia Mamona; POR | 13.94 m	Yanmei Li; CHN | 13.83 m	Rouguy Diallo; FRA | 13.80 m	Irina Gumenyuk; RUS | 13.68 m
Women's shot put	Lijiao Gong; CHN | 20.23 m	Christina Schwanitz; GER | 19.94 m	Tia Brooks-Wannemacher; USA | 18.66 m	Tianqian Guo; CHN | 18.57 m	Anita Márton; HUN | 18.57 m	Cleopatra Borel; TTO | 18.32 m	Gao Yang; CHN | 18.29 m	Yuliya Leantsiuk; BLR | 18.00 m
Women's javelin throw	Huihui Lyu; CHN | 64.08 m	Sunette Viljoen; RSA | 63.60 m	Kimberley Mickle; AUS | 63.60 m	Elizabeth Gleadle; CAN | 62.71 m	Li Lingyu; CHN | 62.47 m	Christina Obergföll; GER | 62.08 m	Kara Winger; USA | 61.76 m	Mariya Abakumova; RUS | 60.66 m

Eugene
Event	1st +4 pts	2nd +2 pts	3rd +1 pts	4th ⠀	5th ⠀	6th ⠀	7th ⠀	8th ⠀
Men's 200m (+0.9 m/s)	Justin Gatlin; USA | 19.68	Anaso Jobodwana; RSA | 20.04	Nickel Ashmeade; JAM | 20.18	Isiah Young; USA | 20.24	Julian Forte; JAM | 20.41	Curtis Mitchell; USA | 20.44	Alonso Edward; PAN | 20.63	Gil Roberts; USA | 20.88
Men's 400m	Kirani James; GRN | 43.95	LaShawn Merritt; USA | 44.51	Christopher Brown; BAH | 44.54	Youssef Ahmed Masrahi; KSA | 44.75	Abdalelah Haroun; QAT | 44.80	Tony McQuay; USA | 44.81	Isaac Makwala; BOT | 45.33	Pavel Maslák; CZE | 45.66
Men's Mile	Ayanleh Souleiman; DJI | 3:51.10	Matthew Centrowitz Jr. USA | 3:51.20	Asbel Kiprop; KEN | 3:51.25	Silas Kiplagat; KEN | 3:51.92	James Kiplagat Magut; KEN | 3:52.33	Ronald Kwemoi; KEN | 3:52.57	Collins Cheboi; KEN | 3:52.63	Johan Cronje; RSA | 3:53.02
Men's 110mH (+1.5 m/s)	Pascal Martinot-Lagarde; FRA | 13.06	Aries Merritt; USA | 13.12	David Oliver; USA | 13.14	Orlando Ortega; CUB | 13.14	Sergey Shubenkov; RUS | 13.28	Andrew Riley; JAM | 13.28	Aleec Harris; USA | 13.39	Wenjun Xie; CHN | 13.39
Men's 400mH	Johnny Dutch; USA | 48.20	Bershawn Jackson; USA | 48.22	Michael Tinsley; USA | 48.79	Kariem Hussein; SUI | 49.24	Rasmus Mägi; EST | 50.08	Javier Culson; PUR | 50.10	Jaheel Hyde; JAM | 50.80	Jehue Gordon; TTO | DNF
Men's 3000mSC	Ezekiel Kemboi; KEN | 8:01.71	Jairus Kipchoge Birech; KEN | 8:01.83	Conseslus Kipruto; KEN | 8:05.20	Evan Jager; USA | 8:05.28	Paul Kipsiele Koech; KEN | 8:13.95	Jonathan Muia Ndiku; KEN | 8:18.38	Hilal Yego; KEN | 8:18.99	Donn Cabral; USA | 8:19.24
Men's high jump	Mutaz Essa Barshim; QAT | 2.41 m	Zhang Guowei; CHN | 2.38 m	Erik Kynard; USA | 2.35 m	Ivan Ukhov; RUS | 2.32 m	Daniil Tsyplakov; RUS | 2.28 m	Andrii Protsenko; UKR | 2.28 m	Jesse Williams; USA | 2.24 m	Donald Thomas; BAH | 2.24 m
Men's pole vault	Renaud Lavillenie; FRA | 6.05 m	Sam Kendricks; USA | 5.80 m	Raphael Holzdeppe; GER | 5.80 m	Valentin Lavillenie; FRA | 5.70 m	Piotr Lisek; POL | 5.70 m	Konstantinos Filippidis; GRE | 5.40 m	Augusto Dutra; BRA | NH m	Changrui Xue; CHN | DNS m
Men's shot put	Joe Kovacs; USA | 22.12 m	David Storl; GER | 21.92 m	Ryan Whiting; USA | 21.37 m	Tom Walsh; NZL | 20.81 m	Tomasz Majewski; POL | 20.23 m	Reese Hoffa; USA | 20.21 m	O'Dayne Richards; JAM | 20.06 m	Kurt Roberts; USA | 19.79 m
Men's discus throw	Piotr Małachowski; POL | 65.59 m	Robert Urbanek; POL | 65.42 m	Vikas Gowda; IND | 64.41 m	Martin Kupper; EST | 63.35 m	Gerd Kanter; EST | 62.99 m	Ehsan Hadadi; IRI | 61.67 m	Jared Schuurmans; USA | 59.92 m	Martin Wierig; GER | 59.60 m
Women's 100m (+1.7 m/s)	Shelly-Ann Fraser-Pryce; JAM | 10.81	Murielle Ahouré-Demps; CIV | 10.81	Tori Bowie; USA | 10.82	Blessing Okagbare; NGR | 10.87	Carmelita Jeter; USA | 11.02	Kelly-Ann Baptiste; TTO | 11.08	Tianna Madison; USA | 11.09	Michelle-Lee Ahye; TTO | 11.90
Women's 800m	Eunice Jepkoech Sum; KEN | 1:57.82	Ajee Wilson; USA | 1:57.87	Brenda Martinez; USA | 1:59.06	Abeba Aregawi; SWE | 1:59.98	Janeth Jepkosgei; KEN | 2:00.02	Chanelle Price; USA | 2:00.19	Lynsey Sharp; GBR | 2:00.61	Marina Arzamasova; BLR | 2:02.49
Women's 5000m	Genzebe Dibaba; ETH | 14:19.76	Faith Kipyegon; KEN | 14:31.95	Vivian Jepkemei Cheruiyot; KEN | 14:46.69	Sally Kipyego; KEN | 14:47.75	Alemitu Haroye; ETH | 14:48.52	Irine Chepet Cheptai; KEN | 14:53.32	Viola Jelagat Kibiwot; KEN | 15:00.69	Yelena Korobkina; RUS | 15:18.80
Women's long jump	Tianna Madison; USA | 7.11 m	Christabel Nettey; CAN | 6.99 m	Lorraine Ugen; GBR | 6.89 m	Shara Proctor; GBR | 6.70 m	Brittney Reese; USA | 6.69 m	Sosthene Moguenara-Taroum; GER | 6.66 m	Funmi Jimoh; USA | 6.57 m	Darya Klishina; RUS | 6.50 m
Women's triple jump	Caterine Ibarguen; COL | 15.18 m	Yekaterina Koneva; RUS | 15.04 m	Olha Saladukha; UKR | 14.48 m	Keila Costa; BRA | 14.21 m	Yosiris Urrutia; COL | 14.03 m	Yanmei Li; CHN | 13.61 m	Amanda Smock; USA | 13.59 m	Caterine Ibarguen; COL | 14.88 m
Women's javelin throw	Christina Obergföll; GER | 63.07 m	Kara Winger; USA | 62.85 m	Madara Palameika; LAT | 62.85 m	Elizabeth Gleadle; CAN | 61.46 m	Barbora Špotáková; CZE | 59.84 m	Linda Stahl; GER | 58.64 m	Mariya Abakumova; RUS | 57.24 m	Martina Ratej; SLO | 55.15 m

Rome
Event	1st +4 pts	2nd +2 pts	3rd +1 pts	4th ⠀	5th ⠀	6th ⠀	7th ⠀	8th ⠀
Men's 100m (+0.9 m/s)	Justin Gatlin; USA | 9.75	Jimmy Vicaut; FRA | 9.98	Michael Rodgers; USA | 9.98	Nesta Carter; JAM | 10.06	Kim Collins; SKN | 10.07	Diondre Batson; USA | 10.08	Akani Simbine; RSA | 10.08	Andrew Fisher; JAM | 10.14
Men's 800m	Mohammed Aman; ETH | 1:43.56	Nijel Amos; BOT | 1:43.80	Job Kinyor; KEN | 1:43.92	Adam Kszczot; POL | 1:43.94	Ferguson Cheruiyot Rotich; KEN | 1:44.00	Marcin Lewandowski; POL | 1:44.25	Pierre-Ambroise Bosse; FRA | 1:44.42	Giordano Benedetti; ITA | 1:45.07
Men's 5000m	Yomif Kejelcha; ETH | 12:58.39	Paul Kipngetich Tanui; KEN | 12:58.69	Hagos Gebrhiwet; ETH | 12:58.69	Imane Merga; ETH | 12:59.04	Thomas Pkemei Longosiwa; KEN | 12:59.78	Muktar Edris; ETH | 13:00.30	Ali Kaya; TUR | 13:00.31	Dejen Gebremeskel; ETH | 13:00.49
Men's 400mH	Johnny Dutch; USA | 48.13	Michael Tinsley; USA | 48.34	Javier Culson; PUR | 48.65	Thomas Barr; IRL | 48.65	Kariem Hussein; SUI | 48.76	Rasmus Mägi; EST | 49.14	Jehue Gordon; TTO | 49.22	Timofey Chalyy; RUS | 49.94
Men's pole vault	Renaud Lavillenie; FRA | 5.91 m	Thiago Braz; BRA | 5.86 m	Aleksandr Gripich; RUS | 5.71 m	Konstantinos Filippidis; GRE | 5.71 m	Paweł Wojciechowski; POL | 5.56 m	Raphael Holzdeppe; GER | 5.56 m	Tobias Scherbarth; GER | 5.56 m	Kévin Ménaldo; FRA | 5.56 m
Men's triple jump	Pedro Pichardo; CUB | 17.96 m	Alexis Copello; CUB | 17.15 m	Ernesto Revé; CUB | 16.89 m	Benjamin Compaoré; FRA | 16.81 m	Nelson Évora; POR | 16.76 m	Lyukman Adams; RUS | 16.58 m	Aleksey Fyodorov; RUS | 16.30 m	Daniele Cavazzani; ITA | 16.22 m
Men's shot put	David Storl; GER | 21.46 m	Jordan Clarke; USA | 21.28 m	Tomáš Staněk; CZE | 20.64 m	Ryan Whiting; USA | 20.60 m	Jakub Szyszkowski; POL | 20.55 m	Tim Nedow; CAN | 20.15 m	O'Dayne Richards; JAM | 20.13 m	Asmir Kolašinac; SRB | 19.98 m
Men's javelin throw	Vítězslav Veselý; CZE | 88.14 m	Julius Yego; KEN | 87.71 m	Keshorn Walcott; TTO | 86.20 m	Tero Pitkämäki; FIN | 82.72 m	Thomas Röhler; GER | 81.61 m	Ihab Abdelrahman; EGY | 81.09 m	Rocco van Rooyen; RSA | 80.33 m	Norbert Bonvecchio; ITA | 79.45 m
Women's 200m (-0.1 m/s)	Jeneba Tarmoh; USA | 22.77	Kerron Stewart; JAM | 22.88	Simone Facey; JAM | 22.91	Anthonique Strachan; BAH | 22.91	Sherone Simpson; JAM | 22.94	Bianca Williams; GBR | 23.32	Hrystyna Stuy; UKR | 23.39	Gloria Hooper; ITA | 23.71
Women's 400m	Francena McCorory; USA | 50.36	Stephenie Ann McPherson; JAM | 50.53	Natasha Hastings; USA | 50.67	Floria Guei; FRA | 51.59	Olha Zemlyak; UKR | 51.61	Novlene Williams-Mills; JAM | 51.68	Christine Day; JAM | 51.68	Libania Grenot; ITA | 51.72
Women's 1500m	Jenny Simpson; USA | 3:59.31	Sifan Hassan; NED | 3:59.68	Dawit Seyaum; ETH | 3:59.76	Laura Muir; GBR | 4:00.61	Viola Jelagat Kibiwot; KEN | 4:01.41	Maureen Koster; NED | 4:02.64	Rababe Arafi; MAR | 4:02.94	Luiza Gega; ALB | 4:03.01
Women's 100mH (+1.0 m/s)	Sharika Nelvis; USA | 12.52	Dawn Harper-Nelson; USA | 12.59	Tiffany Porter; GBR | 12.69	Alina Talay; BLR | 12.70	Queen Claye; USA | 12.79	Cindy Billaud; FRA | 12.85	Jasmin Stowers; USA | 25.21	Brianna McNeal; USA | DNF
Women's 3000mSC	Hyvin Kiyeng; KEN | 9:15.08	Virginia Nyambura; KEN | 9:15.75	Hiwot Ayalew; ETH | 9:16.87	Lidya Chepkurui; KEN | 9:20.44	Madeline Heiner; AUS | 9:21.56	Sofia Assefa; ETH | 9:23.04	Birtukan Fente Alemu; ETH | 9:24.91	Salima el Ouali Alami; MAR | 9:31.88
Women's high jump	Ruth Beitia; ESP | 2.00 m	Blanka Vlašić; CRO | 1.97 m	Kamila Lićwinko; POL | 1.97 m	Mariya Lasitskene; RUS | 1.94 m	Ana Šimić; CRO | 1.94 m	Anna Chicherova; RUS | 1.94 m	Svetlana Shkolina; RUS | 1.94 m	Airinė Palšytė; LTU | 1.90 m
Women's long jump	Darya Klishina; RUS | 6.89 m	Shara Proctor; GBR | 6.85 m	Sosthene Moguenara-Taroum; GER | 6.80 m	Malaika Mihambo; GER | 6.79 m	Funmi Jimoh; USA | 6.72 m	Melanie Bauschke; GER | 6.59 m	Tania Vicenzino; ITA | 6.57 m	Maria del Mar Jover; ESP | 6.48 m
Women's discus throw	Sandra Perković; CRO | 67.92 m	Dani Stevens; AUS | 65.47 m	Yaimé Pérez; CUB | 65.30 m	Julia Harting; GER | 64.11 m	Melina Robert-Michon; FRA | 63.09 m	Gia Lewis-Smallwood; USA | 62.99 m	Nadine Müller; GER | 62.26 m	Anna Rüh; GER | 61.33 m

Birmingham
Event	1st +4 pts	2nd +2 pts	3rd +1 pts	4th ⠀	5th ⠀	6th ⠀	7th ⠀	8th ⠀
Men's 100m (+2.0 m/s)	Marvin Bracy-Williams; USA | 9.93	Adam Gemili; GBR | 9.97	Michael Rodgers; USA | 9.97	Nesta Carter; JAM | 10.00	Richard Kilty; GBR | 10.05	Chijindu Ujah; GBR | 10.11	Julian Forte; JAM | 10.15	Jimmy Vicaut; FRA | DNS
Men's 800m	Nijel Amos; BOT | 1:46.77	Adam Kszczot; POL | 1:47.03	Marcin Lewandowski; POL | 1:47.45	Job Kinyor; KEN | 1:47.49	Jeremiah Kipkorir Mutai; KEN | 1:47.98	Erik Sowinski; USA | 1:48.20	Kyle Langford; GBR | 1:48.28	Theo Blundell; GBR | 1:50.23
Men's 5000m	Thomas Pkemei Longosiwa; KEN | 13:07.26	Isiah Kiplangat Koech; KEN | 13:11.22	Stephen Mokoka; RSA | 13:20.22	Edwin Cheruiyot Soi; KEN | 13:21.07	Brett Robinson; AUS | 13:21.23	Stephen Sambu; KEN | 13:25.13	Collis Birmingham; AUS | 13:36.17	Zane Robertson; NZL | 13:40.88
Men's long jump	Greg Rutherford; GBR | 8.35 m	Michael Hartfield; USA | 8.23 m	Dan Bramble; GBR | 8.17 m	Tyrone Smith; BER | 8.14 m	Godfrey Khotso Mokoena; RSA | 8.10 m	Damar Forbes; JAM | 8.06 m	Chris Tomlinson; GBR | 7.96 m	Zarck Visser; RSA | 7.74 m
Men's triple jump	Christian Taylor; USA | 17.40 m	Benjamin Compaoré; FRA | 17.01 m	Tosin Oke; NGR | 16.71 m	Chris Carter; USA | 16.58 m	Lázaro Martínez; CUB | 16.48 m	Brandon Roulhac; USA | 16.28 m	Jean-Marc Pontvianne; FRA | 16.12 m	Samyr Laine; HAI | 16.05 m
Men's javelin throw	Julius Yego; KEN | 91.39 m	Vítězslav Veselý; CZE | 88.18 m	Keshorn Walcott; TTO | 86.43 m	Jakub Vadlejch; CZE | 84.34 m	Tero Pitkämäki; FIN | 83.72 m	Thomas Röhler; GER | 83.37 m	Ihab Abdelrahman; EGY | 81.46 m	Hamish Peacock; AUS | 80.66 m
Women's 200m (+1.7 m/s)	Jeneba Tarmoh; USA | 22.29	Allyson Felix; USA | 22.29	Dina Asher-Smith; GBR | 22.30	Rosângela Santos; BRA | 22.77	Anthonique Strachan; BAH | 22.89	Simone Facey; JAM | 22.92	Jessica Young-Warren; USA | 23.19	Geisa Aparecida Coutinho; BRA | DNS
Women's 400m	Stephenie Ann McPherson; JAM | 52.14	Geisa Aparecida Coutinho; BRA | 52.59	Anyika Onuora; GBR | 52.75	Jessica Beard; USA | 53.06	Christine Day; JAM | 53.24	Jasmine Hyder; USA | 54.29	Iveta Putalová; SVK | 54.43	Gloria Hooper; ITA | 54.59
Women's 1500m	Sifan Hassan; NED | 4:00.30	Abeba Aregawi; SWE | 4:01.97	Laura Weightman; GBR | 4:06.42	Maureen Koster; NED | 4:06.62	Gudaf Tsegay; ETH | 4:06.77	Renata Pliś; POL | 4:08.37	Gabriele Grunewald; USA | 4:08.61	Morgan Uceny; USA | 4:09.31
Women's 100mH (+1.5 m/s)	Dawn Harper-Nelson; USA | 12.58	Brianna McNeal; USA | 12.63	Tiffany Porter; GBR | 12.65	Queen Claye; USA | 12.71	Serita Solomon; GBR | 12.87	Jacquelyn Coward; USA | 13.34	Yvette Lewis; PAN | 13.46	Jasmin Stowers; USA | DQ
Women's 400mH	Kaliese Carter; JAM | 54.45	Cassandra Tate; USA | 54.73	Zuzana Hejnová; CZE | 55.00	Eilidh Doyle; GBR | 55.14	Denisa Rosolová; CZE | 55.15	Kori Carter; USA | 56.12	Tiffany Williams; USA | 56.40	Lashinda Demus; USA | 56.48
Women's 3000mSC	Virginia Nyambura; KEN | 9:24.01	Hyvin Kiyeng; KEN | 9:25.20	Lidya Chepkurui; KEN | 9:26.54	Stephanie Garcia; USA | 9:27.92	Magdalyne Masai; KEN | 9:29.16	Sofia Assefa; ETH | 9:29.78	Birtukan Fente Alemu; ETH | 9:38.38	Madeline Heiner; AUS | 9:41.28
Women's high jump	Kamila Lićwinko; POL | 1.97 m	Justyna Kasprzycka; POL | 1.94 m	Mariya Lasitskene; RUS | 1.94 m	Isobel Pooley; GBR | 1.91 m	Alessia Trost; ITA | 1.91 m	Ana Šimić; CRO | 1.91 m	Levern Spencer; LCA | 1.91 m	Morgan Lake; GBR | 1.88 m
Women's pole vault	Fabiana Murer; BRA | 4.72 m	Mary Saxer; USA | 4.62 m	Anzhelika Sidorova; RUS | 4.62 m	Nikoleta Kyriakopoulou; GRE | 4.62 m	Aikaterini Stefanidi; GRE | 4.42 m	Yarisley Silva; CUB | 4.42 m	Marion Lotout; FRA | 4.22 m	Silke Spiegelburg; GER | 4.22 m
Women's shot put	Christina Schwanitz; GER | 19.68 m	Cleopatra Borel; TTO | 18.80 m	Tia Brooks-Wannemacher; USA | 18.67 m	Michelle Carter; USA | 18.30 m	Brittany Smith; USA | 18.10 m	Anita Márton; HUN | 17.89 m	Felisha Johnson; USA | 17.67 m	Rachel Wallader; GBR | 16.98 m
Women's discus throw	Sandra Perković; CRO | 69.23 m	Dani Stevens; AUS | 64.89 m	Melina Robert-Michon; FRA | 63.23 m	Nadine Müller; GER | 62.55 m	Julia Harting; GER | 61.98 m	Gia Lewis-Smallwood; USA | 59.62 m	Żaneta Glanc; POL | 59.18 m	Irina Rodrigues; POR | 58.69 m

Oslo
Event	1st +4 pts	2nd +2 pts	3rd +1 pts	4th ⠀	5th ⠀	6th ⠀	7th ⠀	8th ⠀
Men's 200m (-1.2 m/s)	Christophe Lemaitre; FRA | 20.21	Anaso Jobodwana; RSA | 20.39	Richard Kilty; GBR | 20.54	Carvin Nkanata; KEN | 20.77	Karol Zalewski; POL | 20.89	James Ellington; GBR | 20.90	Jaysuma Saidy Ndure; NOR | 20.97	Harry Adams; USA | DQ
Men's 400m	Steven Gardiner; BAH | 44.64	Matthew Hudson-Smith; GBR | 45.09	Pavel Maslák; CZE | 45.39	Martyn Rooney; GBR | 45.46	Isaac Makwala; BOT | 45.74	Karsten Warholm; NOR | 46.23	Delano Williams; GBR | 46.32	Nick Ekelund-Arenander; DEN | 46.38
Men's Mile	Asbel Kiprop; KEN | 3:51.45	Silas Kiplagat; KEN | 3:51.72	Pieter-Jan Hannes; BEL | 3:51.84	Ayanleh Souleiman; DJI | 3:52.69	Ronald Kwemoi; KEN | 3:53.07	Jakub Holuša; CZE | 3:53.46	Henrik Ingebrigtsen; NOR | 3:54.44	Charles Philibert-Thiboutot; CAN | 3:54.52
Men's 3000mSC	Jairus Kipchoge Birech; KEN | 8:05.63	Conseslus Kipruto; KEN | 8:11.92	Paul Kipsiele Koech; KEN | 8:12.20	Hilal Yego; KEN | 8:18.01	Donn Cabral; USA | 8:19.07	Brahim Taleb; MAR | 8:21.33	Krystian Zalewski; POL | 8:22.44	Jonathan Muia Ndiku; KEN | 8:25.80
Men's high jump	Zhang Guowei; CHN | 2.36 m	Marco Fassinotti; ITA | 2.33 m	Mutaz Essa Barshim; QAT | 2.33 m	Erik Kynard; USA | 2.33 m	Bohdan Bondarenko; UKR | 2.33 m	Derek Drouin; CAN | 2.29 m	Daniil Tsyplakov; RUS | 2.29 m	Ivan Ukhov; RUS | 2.25 m
Men's long jump	Greg Rutherford; GBR | 8.25 m	Michael Hartfield; USA | 8.04 m	Aleksandr Menkov; RUS | 8.00 m	Christian Taylor; USA | 7.93 m	Godfrey Khotso Mokoena; RSA | 7.90 m	Zarck Visser; RSA | 7.85 m	Michel Tornéus; SWE | 7.75 m	Eusebio Cáceres; ESP | 7.69 m
Men's discus throw	Robert Urbanek; POL | 63.85 m	Erik Cadée; NED | 62.32 m	Piotr Małachowski; POL | 62.32 m	Christoph Harting; GER | 62.19 m	Gerd Kanter; EST | 61.18 m	Ehsan Hadadi; IRI | 60.46 m	Martin Kupper; EST | 60.43 m	Sven Martin Skagestad; NOR | 58.72 m
Women's 100m (-0.6 m/s)	Murielle Ahouré-Demps; CIV | 11.03	Veronica Campbell-Brown; JAM | 11.08	Rosângela Santos; BRA | 11.27	Jessica Young-Warren; USA | 11.27	Asha Philip; GBR | 11.35	Ivet Lalova-Collio; BUL | 11.47	Stella Akakpo; FRA | 11.52	Ezinne Okparaebo; NOR | 11.53
Women's 1500m	Laura Muir; GBR | 4:00.39	Faith Kipyegon; KEN | 4:00.94	Dawit Seyaum; ETH | 4:02.90	Abeba Aregawi; SWE | 4:03.07	Gabriele Grunewald; USA | 4:04.26	Laura Weightman; GBR | 4:04.70	Renata Pliś; POL | 4:04.74	Heather Kampf; USA | 4:05.12
Women's 5000m	Genzebe Dibaba; ETH | 14:21.29	Senbere Teferi; ETH | 14:38.57	Viola Jelagat Kibiwot; KEN | 14:40.43	Gelete Burka; ETH | 14:41.55	Irine Chepet Cheptai; KEN | 15:03.84	Susan Krumins; NED | 15:07.38	Karoline Bjerkeli Grøvdal; NOR | 15:15.18	Magdalyne Masai; KEN | 15:16.17
Women's 100mH (-1.4 m/s)	Jasmin Stowers; USA | 12.84	Brianna McNeal; USA | 12.84	Queen Claye; USA | 13.02	Lolo Jones; USA | 13.14	Jacquelyn Coward; USA | 13.18	Alina Talay; BLR | 13.18	Isabelle Pedersen; NOR | 13.27	Ida Bakke Hansen; NOR | 14.20
Women's 400mH	Kaliese Carter; JAM | 54.15	Georganne Moline; USA | 54.29	Zuzana Hejnová; CZE | 55.14	Kemi Adekoya; BRN | 55.37	Denisa Rosolová; CZE | 55.60	Eilidh Doyle; GBR | 55.97	Tiffany Williams; USA | 56.28	Hanna Titimets; UKR | 57.46
Women's triple jump	Caterine Ibarguen; COL | 14.68 m	Gabriela Petrova; BUL | 14.57 m	Olha Saladukha; UKR | 14.46 m	Yekaterina Koneva; RUS | 14.36 m	Hanna Minenko; ISR | 14.22 m	Patrícia Mamona; POR | 14.19 m	Susana Costa; POR | 13.58 m	Keila Costa; BRA | 13.58 m
Women's shot put	Christina Schwanitz; GER | 20.14 m	Michelle Carter; USA | 19.20 m	Brittany Smith; USA | 18.93 m	Felisha Johnson; USA | 18.66 m	Tia Brooks-Wannemacher; USA | 18.54 m	Cleopatra Borel; TTO | 18.50 m	Anita Márton; HUN | 17.96 m	Kristin Sundsteigen; NOR | 13.87 m
Women's javelin throw	Margaryta Dorozhon; ISR | 64.56 m	Sunette Viljoen; RSA | 64.36 m	Barbora Špotáková; CZE | 64.10 m	Martina Ratej; SLO | 62.59 m	Elizabeth Gleadle; CAN | 61.84 m	Kara Winger; USA | 61.64 m	Christina Obergföll; GER | 60.88 m	Ásdís Hjálmsdóttir; ISL | 59.77 m

New
Event	1st ⠀	2nd ⠀	3rd ⠀	4th ⠀	5th ⠀	6th ⠀	7th ⠀	8th ⠀
Men's 100m (-1.7 m/s)	Tyson Gay; USA | 10.12	Keston Bledman; TTO | 10.13	Nesta Carter; JAM | 10.15	Akani Simbine; RSA | 10.18	Diondre Batson; USA | 10.24	Nickel Ashmeade; JAM | 10.28	Trell Kimmons; USA | 10.40	Joseph Morris; USA | 10.45
Men's 800m	David Rudisha; KEN | 1:43.58	Boris Berian; USA | 1:43.84	Pierre-Ambroise Bosse; FRA | 1:43.88	Matthew Centrowitz Jr. USA | 1:44.62	Leonel Manzano; USA | 1:45.24	Robby Andrews; USA | 1:45.98	Mark English; IRL | 1:46.12	Michael Rutt; USA | 1:46.83
Men's 5000m	Ben True; USA | 13:29.48	Nick Willis; NZL | 13:29.78	Nguse Amlosom; ERI | 13:30.22	Thomas Pkemei Longosiwa; KEN | 13:30.26	Moses Ndiema Kipsiro; UGA | 13:31.37	Arne Gabius; GER | 13:32.68	Nixon Kiplimo Chepseba; KEN | 13:36.25	Antonio Abadía; ESP | 13:44.91
Men's 110mH (-1.2 m/s)	David Oliver; USA | 13.19	Jason Richardson; USA | 13.26	Garfield Darien; FRA | 13.32	Ronnie Ash; USA | 13.33	Orlando Ortega; CUB | 13.34	Jeff Porter; USA | 13.34	Shane Brathwaite; BAR | 13.44	Aleec Harris; USA | 13.50
Men's 400mH	Javier Culson; PUR | 48.48	LJ van Zyl; RSA | 48.78	Jeffery Gibson; BAH | 48.97	Roxroy Cato; JAM | 48.97	Miles Ukaoma; NGR | 49.25	Jehue Gordon; TTO | 49.34	Annsert Whyte; JAM | 49.62	
Men's triple jump	Pedro Pichardo; CUB | 17.56 m	Will Claye; USA | 16.96 m	Omar Craddock; USA | 16.55 m	Ernesto Revé; CUB | 16.53 m	Tosin Oke; NGR | 16.47 m	Chris Benard; USA | 16.45 m	Yordanys Duranona Garcia; DMA | 16.25 m	Benjamin Compaoré; FRA | 15.96 m
Men's shot put	Joe Kovacs; USA | 21.67 m	Jordan Clarke; USA | 21.34 m	Tom Walsh; NZL | 21.16 m	O'Dayne Richards; JAM | 21.00 m	Reese Hoffa; USA | 20.85 m	Ryan Whiting; USA | 20.15 m	Christian Cantwell; USA | 20.11 m	Orazio Cremona; RSA | 19.51 m
Men's javelin throw	Vítězslav Veselý; CZE | 83.62 m	Ari Mannio; FIN | 83.37 m	Hamish Peacock; AUS | 82.91 m	Thomas Röhler; GER | 81.40 m	Riley Dolezal; USA | 81.16 m	Marcin Krukowski; POL | 79.87 m	Tim Glover; USA | 73.99 m	Guillermo Martínez; CUB | 73.07 m
Women's 200m (-2.8 m/s)	Tori Bowie; USA | 22.23	Blessing Okagbare; NGR | 22.67	Sherone Simpson; JAM | 22.69	Kimberlyn Duncan; USA | 22.99	Tiffany Townsend; USA | 23.04	Candyce McGrone; USA | 23.10	Ángela Gabriela Tenorio; ECU | 23.13	Charonda Williams; USA | 23.27
Women's 400m	Francena McCorory; USA | 49.86	Shaunae Miller-Uibo; BAH | 50.66	Stephenie Ann McPherson; JAM | 50.84	Natasha Hastings; USA | 50.99	Christine Day; JAM | 51.48	Jessica Beard; USA | 51.51	Floria Guei; FRA | 51.94	Novlene Williams-Mills; JAM | DNF
Women's 800m	Ajee Wilson; USA | 1:58.83	Janeth Jepkosgei; KEN | 1:59.37	Chanelle Price; USA | 1:59.47	Molly Ludlow; USA | 1:59.93	Brenda Martinez; USA | 2:00.33	Lynsey Sharp; GBR | 2:00.37	Treniere Moser; USA | 2:00.42	Jennifer Meadows; GBR | 2:00.55
Women's 3000mSC	Hiwot Ayalew; ETH | 9:25.26	Ashley Higginson; USA | 9:31.32	Sviatlana Kudzelich; BLR | 9:31.70	Genevieve Gregson; AUS | 9:35.17	Geneviève Lalonde; CAN | 9:35.69	Bridget Franek; USA | 9:36.88	Aisha Praught-Leer; USA | 9:39.19	Nicole Bush; USA | 9:44.68
Women's high jump	Ruth Beitia; ESP | 1.97 m	Blanka Vlašić; CRO | 1.97 m	Levern Spencer; LCA | 1.91 m	Isobel Pooley; GBR | 1.91 m	Chaunte Lowe; USA | 1.91 m	Priscilla Frederick; ANT | 1.88 m	Iryna Kovalenko; UKR | NH m	Justyna Kasprzycka; POL | DNS m
Women's pole vault	Fabiana Murer; BRA | 4.80 m	Nikoleta Kyriakopoulou; GRE | 4.80 m	Jennifer Suhr; USA | 4.54 m	Yarisley Silva; CUB | 4.44 m	Kelsie Ahbe; CAN | 4.44 m	Alyona Lutkovskaya; RUS | 4.44 m	Janice Keppler; USA | 4.24 m	Aikaterini Stefanidi; GRE | NH m
Women's long jump	Christabel Nettey; CAN | 6.92 m	Tianna Madison; USA | 6.89 m	Shara Proctor; GBR | 6.72 m	Funmi Jimoh; USA | 6.50 m	Chelsea Hayes; USA | 6.35 m	Erica Jarder; SWE | 6.34 m	Keila Costa; BRA | 6.19 m	Jessie Gaines; USA | 6.07 m
Women's discus throw	Sandra Perković; CRO | 68.44 m	Yaimé Pérez; CUB | 65.86 m	Melina Robert-Michon; FRA | 62.77 m	Shanice Craft; GER | 62.69 m	Gia Lewis-Smallwood; USA | 61.44 m	Whitney Ashley; USA | 60.69 m	Liz Podominick; USA | 55.51 m	Stephanie Brown-Trafton; USA | 54.46 m

Paris
Event	1st +4 pts	2nd +2 pts	3rd +1 pts	4th ⠀	5th ⠀	6th ⠀	7th ⠀	8th ⠀
Men's 100m (+1.3 m/s)	Asafa Powell; JAM | 9.81	Jimmy Vicaut; FRA | 9.86	Michael Rodgers; USA | 9.99	Nesta Carter; JAM | 10.02	Kim Collins; SKN | 10.05	Clayton Vaughn; USA | 10.08	Churandy Martina; NED | 10.12	Emmanuel Biron; FRA | 10.18
Men's 400m	Wayde van Niekerk; RSA | 43.96	Kirani James; GRN | 44.17	David Verburg; USA | 44.81	Rusheen McDonald; JAM | 44.84	Jonathan Borlée; BEL | 44.93	Michael Berry; USA | 45.49	Pavel Maslák; CZE | 45.51	Edino Steele; JAM | 46.22
Men's 1500m	Silas Kiplagat; KEN | 3:30.12	Ayanleh Souleiman; DJI | 3:30.17	Ronald Kwemoi; KEN | 3:30.43	Taoufik Makhloufi; ALG | 3:30.50	Robert Biwott; KEN | 3:31.39	Abdelaati Iguider; MAR | 3:31.51	James Kiplagat Magut; KEN | 3:31.76	Collins Cheboi; KEN | 3:31.88
Men's 110mH (+0.5 m/s)	Wilhem Belocian; FRA | DNS	Orlando Ortega; CUB | 12.94	David Oliver; USA | 12.98	Sergey Shubenkov; RUS | 13.06	Aleec Harris; USA | 13.11	Pascal Martinot-Lagarde; FRA | 13.18	Garfield Darien; FRA | 13.19	Dimitri Bascou; FRA | 13.31
Men's 3000mSC	Jairus Kipchoge Birech; KEN | 7:58.83	Evan Jager; USA | 8:00.45	Conseslus Kipruto; KEN | 8:09.90	Brimin Kiprop Kipruto; KEN | 8:10.09	Clement Kimutai Kemboi; KEN | 8:12.68	Paul Kipsiele Koech; KEN | 8:14.65	Daniel Huling; USA | 8:15.21	Hilal Yego; KEN | 8:16.55
Men's high jump	Daniil Tsyplakov; RUS | 2.32 m	Donald Thomas; BAH | 2.32 m	Antonios Mastoras; GRE | 2.29 m	Erik Kynard; USA | 2.29 m	Mutaz Essa Barshim; QAT | 2.29 m	Aleksandr Shustov; RUS | DQ	Jaroslav Bába; CZE | 2.29 m	Marco Fassinotti; ITA | 2.24 m
Men's pole vault	Konstantinos Filippidis; GRE | 5.91 m	Thiago Braz; BRA | 5.86 m	Sam Kendricks; USA | 5.81 m	Kévin Ménaldo; FRA | 5.81 m	Aleksandr Gripich; RUS | 5.71 m	Renaud Lavillenie; FRA | 5.71 m	Jan Kudlička; CZE | 5.71 m	Piotr Lisek; POL | 5.56 m
Men's long jump	Michael Hartfield; USA | 8.19 m	Kafétien Gomis; FRA | 8.13 m	Fabrice Lapierre; AUS | 8.07 m	Eusebio Cáceres; ESP | 8.06 m	Aleksandr Menkov; RUS | 7.99 m	Damar Forbes; JAM | 7.89 m	Tyrone Smith; BER | 7.86 m	Salim Sdiri; FRA | 7.64 m
Men's discus throw	Piotr Małachowski; POL | 65.57 m	Zoltán Kővágó; HUN | 65.23 m	Gerd Kanter; EST | 64.11 m	Christoph Harting; GER | 63.90 m	Robert Urbanek; POL | 63.48 m	Vikas Gowda; IND | 63.17 m	Jason Morgan; JAM | 62.03 m	Philip Milanov; BEL | 61.31 m
Women's 100m (+0.2 m/s)	Shelly-Ann Fraser-Pryce; JAM | 10.74	Blessing Okagbare; NGR | 10.80	English Gardner; USA | 10.97	Dafne Schippers; NED | 11.02	Murielle Ahouré-Demps; CIV | 11.04	Marie-Josée Ta Lou; CIV | 11.06	Natasha Morrison; JAM | 11.10	Dezerea Bryant; USA | 11.19
Women's 800m	Eunice Jepkoech Sum; KEN | 1:56.99	Rose Mary Almanza; CUB | 1:57.70	Selina Rutz-Büchel; SUI | 1:57.95	Molly Ludlow; USA | 1:58.68	Chanelle Price; USA | 1:59.10	Ekaterina Guliyev; RUS | DQ	Joanna Jóźwik; POL | 2:00.09	Nataliya Lupu; UKR | 2:00.54
Women's 5000m	Genzebe Dibaba; ETH | 14:15.41	Almaz Ayana; ETH | 14:21.97	Mercy Cherono; KEN | 14:34.10	Viola Jelagat Kibiwot; KEN | 14:34.22	Senbere Teferi; ETH | 14:36.44	Gelete Burka; ETH | 14:40.50	Faith Kipyegon; KEN | 14:44.51	Alemitu Haroye; ETH | 14:44.95
Women's 400mH	Zuzana Hejnová; CZE | 53.76	Sara Slott Petersen; DEN | 53.99	Kemi Adekoya; BRN | 54.12	Cassandra Tate; USA | 54.52	Wenda Nel; RSA | 54.61	Georganne Moline; USA | 55.37	Janieve Russell; JAM | 55.54	Aurelie Chaboudez; FRA | 56.03
Women's pole vault	Nikoleta Kyriakopoulou; GRE | 4.83 m	Yarisley Silva; CUB | 4.73 m	Fabiana Murer; BRA | 4.63 m	Anzhelika Sidorova; RUS | 4.63 m	Silke Spiegelburg; GER | 4.63 m	Sandi Morris; USA | 4.53 m	Marion Lotout; FRA | 4.53 m	Nicole Büchler; SUI | 4.53 m
Women's triple jump	Caterine Ibarguen; COL | 14.87 m	Yekaterina Koneva; RUS | 14.72 m	Hanna Minenko; ISR | 14.56 m	Olga Rypakova; KAZ | 14.44 m	Gabriela Petrova; BUL | 14.23 m	Kimberly Williams; JAM | 14.20 m	Susana Costa; POR | 13.95 m	Jeanine Assani Issouf; FRA | 13.86 m
Women's shot put	Christina Schwanitz; GER | 20.31 m	Lijiao Gong; CHN | 19.75 m	Michelle Carter; USA | 19.37 m	Cleopatra Borel; TTO | 19.07 m	Valerie Adams; NZL | 18.79 m	Jeneva Stevens; USA | 18.79 m	Anita Márton; HUN | 18.42 m	Irina Tarasova; RUS | DQ
Women's javelin throw	Barbora Špotáková; CZE | 64.42 m	Kimberley Mickle; AUS | 63.80 m	Sunette Viljoen; RSA | 63.15 m	Margaryta Dorozhon; ISR | 62.94 m	Madara Palameika; LAT | 62.28 m	Kara Winger; USA | 61.71 m	Huihui Lyu; CHN | 61.01 m	Linda Stahl; GER | 59.77 m

Lausanne
Event	1st +4 pts	2nd +2 pts	3rd +1 pts	4th ⠀	5th ⠀	6th ⠀	7th ⠀	8th ⠀
Men's 200m (0.0 m/s)	Zharnel Hughes; GBR | 20.13	Anaso Jobodwana; RSA | 20.21	Isiah Young; USA | 20.27	Lykourgos-Stefanos Tsakonas; GRE | 20.40	Alonso Edward; PAN | 20.48	Churandy Martina; NED | 20.72	Ameer Webb; USA | 20.74	Nickel Ashmeade; JAM | 20.96
Men's 800m	Nijel Amos; BOT | 1:43.27	David Rudisha; KEN | 1:43.76	Ferguson Cheruiyot Rotich; KEN | 1:44.44	Alfred Kipketer; KEN | 1:45.14	Marcin Lewandowski; POL | 1:45.36	Job Kinyor; KEN | 1:45.53	Pierre-Ambroise Bosse; FRA | 1:45.62	Mohammed Aman; ETH | 1:46.03
Men's 5000m	Mo Farah; GBR | 13:11.77	Yomif Kejelcha; ETH | 13:12.59	Edwin Cheruiyot Soi; KEN | 13:17.17	Yasin Haji; ETH | 13:18.18	Muktar Edris; ETH | 13:19.17	Bedan Karoki; KEN | 13:21.26	Aweke Ayalew; BRN | 13:21.72	Yenew Alamirew; ETH | 13:22.68
Men's 400mH	Bershawn Jackson; USA | 48.71	LJ van Zyl; RSA | 48.92	Denis Kudryavtsev; RUS | 49.01	Javier Culson; PUR | 49.33	Michael Tinsley; USA | 49.42	Kariem Hussein; SUI | 49.44	Quincy Downing; USA | 49.96	Jehue Gordon; TTO | 50.07
Men's pole vault	Paweł Wojciechowski; POL | 5.84 m	Raphael Holzdeppe; GER | 5.76 m	Renaud Lavillenie; FRA | 5.76 m	Konstantinos Filippidis; GRE | 5.76 m	Sam Kendricks; USA | 5.61 m	Thiago Braz; BRA | 5.61 m	Aleksandr Gripich; RUS | 5.61 m	Kévin Ménaldo; FRA | 5.61 m
Men's triple jump	Christian Taylor; USA | 18.06 m	Pedro Pichardo; CUB | 17.99 m	Omar Craddock; USA | 17.30 m	Nelson Évora; POR | 17.24 m	Lyukman Adams; RUS | 16.78 m	Fabrizio Donato; ITA | 16.60 m	Fabian Florant; NED | 16.16 m	Omar Craddock; USA | 17.14 m
Men's shot put	David Storl; GER | 22.20 m	Joe Kovacs; USA | 21.71 m	Reese Hoffa; USA | 21.30 m	Christian Cantwell; USA | 20.94 m	Tom Walsh; NZL | 20.86 m	Ryan Whiting; USA | 20.73 m	Tomasz Majewski; POL | 20.64 m	Jordan Clarke; USA | 20.60 m
Men's javelin throw	Keshorn Walcott; TTO | 90.16 m	Vítězslav Veselý; CZE | 87.97 m	Tero Pitkämäki; FIN | 87.44 m	Julius Yego; KEN | 85.50 m	Jakub Vadlejch; CZE | 85.15 m	Ari Mannio; FIN | 80.80 m	Thomas Röhler; GER | 80.73 m	Hamish Peacock; AUS | 79.49 m
Women's 200m (+1.9 m/s)	Allyson Felix; USA | 22.09	Dafne Schippers; NED | 22.29	Murielle Ahouré-Demps; CIV | 22.36	Dezerea Bryant; USA | 22.63	Jeneba Tarmoh; USA | 22.69	Sanya Richards-Ross; USA | 22.94	Bianca Williams; GBR | 23.24	Mujinga Kambundji; SUI | 23.27
Women's 400m	Shaunae Miller-Uibo; BAH | 49.92	Sanya Richards-Ross; USA | 51.12	Novlene Williams-Mills; JAM | 51.15	Anyika Onuora; GBR | 51.26	Natasha Hastings; USA | 51.29	Regina George; NGR | 51.99	Phyllis Francis; USA | 52.04	Indira Terrero; ESP | 53.99
Women's 1500m	Sifan Hassan; NED | 4:02.36	Faith Kipyegon; KEN | 4:03.38	Jenny Simpson; USA | 4:03.54	Mercy Cherono; KEN | 4:04.24	Gudaf Tsegay; ETH | 4:05.29	Siham Hilali; MAR | 4:05.55	Viola Jelagat Kibiwot; KEN | 4:06.40	Senbere Teferi; ETH | 4:06.81
Women's 100mH (+1.7 m/s)	Dawn Harper-Nelson; USA | 12.55	Jasmin Stowers; USA | 12.58	Queen Claye; USA | 12.63	Sharika Nelvis; USA | 12.63	Tiffany Porter; GBR | 12.66	Kristi Castlin; USA | 12.71	Alina Talay; BLR | 12.81	Jacquelyn Coward; USA | 13.14
Women's 3000mSC	Virginia Nyambura; KEN | 9:16.99	Hiwot Ayalew; ETH | 9:17.22	Emma Coburn; USA | 9:20.67	Ruth Jebet; BRN | 9:26.87	Tigest Getent Mekonen; BRN | 9:31.53	Lidya Chepkurui; KEN | 9:33.03	Caroline Tuigong; KEN | 9:34.15	Sviatlana Kudzelich; BLR | 9:35.42
Women's high jump	Anna Chicherova; RUS | 2.03 m	Ruth Beitia; ESP | 1.94 m	Erika Kinsey; SWE | 1.94 m	Svetlana Shkolina; RUS | 1.94 m	Ana Šimić; CRO | 1.91 m	Svetlana Radzivil; UZB | 1.91 m	Marie-Laurence Jungfleisch; GER | 1.88 m	Levern Spencer; LCA | 1.88 m
Women's long jump	Tianna Madison; USA | 6.86 m	Shara Proctor; GBR | 6.79 m	Christabel Nettey; CAN | 6.68 m	Blessing Okagbare; NGR | 6.66 m	Sosthene Moguenara-Taroum; GER | 6.60 m	Ivana Vuleta; SRB | 6.60 m	Janay Deloach; USA | 6.58 m	Darya Klishina; RUS | 6.57 m
Women's discus throw	Yaimé Pérez; CUB | 67.13 m	Sandra Perković; CRO | 67.06 m	Denia Caballero; CUB | 66.04 m	Dani Stevens; AUS | 64.59 m	Melina Robert-Michon; FRA | 63.78 m	Nadine Müller; GER | 63.52 m	Whitney Ashley; USA | 61.74 m	

Monaco
Event	1st +4 pts	2nd +2 pts	3rd +1 pts	4th ⠀	5th ⠀	6th ⠀	7th ⠀	8th ⠀
Men's 100m (-0.3 m/s)	Justin Gatlin; USA | 9.78	Tyson Gay; USA | 9.97	Jimmy Vicaut; FRA | 10.03	Chijindu Ujah; GBR | 10.08	Keston Bledman; TTO | 10.10	Nickel Ashmeade; JAM | 10.11	Emmanuel Biron; FRA | 10.17	Trayvon Bromell; USA | DQ
Men's 800m	Amel Tuka; BIH | 1:42.51	Nijel Amos; BOT | 1:42.66	Ayanleh Souleiman; DJI | 1:42.97	Boris Berian; USA | 1:43.34	Adam Kszczot; POL | 1:43.45	Marcin Lewandowski; POL | 1:43.72	Ferguson Cheruiyot Rotich; KEN | 1:43.92	Mohammed Aman; ETH | 1:44.09
Men's 3000m	Caleb Mwangangi Ndiku; KEN | 7:35.13	Yenew Alamirew; ETH | 7:36.39	Isiah Kiplangat Koech; KEN | 7:37.16	Edwin Cheruiyot Soi; KEN | 7:37.85	Garrett Heath; USA | 7:37.97	Ben Blankenship; USA | 7:38.08	Ali Kaya; TUR | 7:38.65	Hillary Kipkorir Maiyo; KEN | 7:39.70
Men's 400mH	Bershawn Jackson; USA | 48.23	Patryk Dobek; POL | 48.62	Johnny Dutch; USA | 48.67	Michael Tinsley; USA | 48.83	LJ van Zyl; RSA | 48.88	Mohamed Seghaier; TUN | 49.53	Michael Stigler; USA | 49.80	Mickael Francois; FRA | 50.01
Men's pole vault	Renaud Lavillenie; FRA | 5.92 m	Konstantinos Filippidis; GRE | 5.82 m	Sam Kendricks; USA | 5.82 m	Paweł Wojciechowski; POL | 5.82 m	Brad Walker; USA | 5.72 m	Jan Kudlička; CZE | 5.72 m	Raphael Holzdeppe; GER | 5.72 m	Michal Balner; CZE | 5.57 m
Men's triple jump	Christian Taylor; USA | 17.75 m	Pedro Pichardo; CUB | 17.73 m	Omar Craddock; USA | 17.35 m	Nelson Évora; POR | 17.11 m	Benjamin Compaoré; FRA | 16.97 m	Marquis Dendy; USA | 16.96 m	Harold Correa; FRA | 16.58 m	Julian Reid; GBR | 15.96 m
Men's shot put	Joe Kovacs; USA | 22.56 m	Christian Cantwell; USA | 21.24 m	Reese Hoffa; USA | 21.08 m	Tom Walsh; NZL | 20.73 m	Ryan Whiting; USA | 20.73 m	Jordan Clarke; USA | 20.72 m	Tomasz Majewski; POL | 20.28 m	Tsanko Arnaudov; POR | 19.45 m
Men's javelin throw	Tero Pitkämäki; FIN | 88.87 m	Vítězslav Veselý; CZE | 85.44 m	Jakub Vadlejch; CZE | 84.32 m	Keshorn Walcott; TTO | 83.54 m	Thomas Röhler; GER | 82.60 m	Julius Yego; KEN | 81.79 m	Ari Mannio; FIN | 80.91 m	Hamish Peacock; AUS | 77.66 m
Women's 200m (-0.3 m/s)	Candyce McGrone; USA | 22.08	Dafne Schippers; NED | 22.09	Jeneba Tarmoh; USA | 22.23	Dina Asher-Smith; GBR | 22.41	Kaylin Whitney; USA | 22.54	Dezerea Bryant; USA | 22.87	Shaunae Miller-Uibo; BAH | 28.28	Blessing Okagbare; NGR | DQ
Women's 400m	Francena McCorory; USA | 49.83	Stephenie Ann McPherson; JAM | 50.41	Christine Day; JAM | 50.66	Christine Ohuruogu; GBR | 50.82	Floria Guei; FRA | 50.90	Libania Grenot; ITA | 51.07	Phyllis Francis; USA | 51.17	Marie Gayot; FRA | 51.31
Women's 1500m	Genzebe Dibaba; ETH | 3:50.07	Sifan Hassan; NED | 3:56.05	Shannon Rowbury; USA | 3:56.29	Jenny Simpson; USA | 3:57.30	Laura Muir; GBR | 3:58.66	Maureen Koster; NED | 3:59.79	Besu Sado; ETH | 4:00.65	Anna Shchagina; RUS | 4:01.46
Women's 100mH (-0.3 m/s)	Sharika Nelvis; USA | 12.46	Kendra Harrison; USA | 12.52	Brianna McNeal; USA | 12.56	Jasmin Stowers; USA | 12.56	Dawn Harper-Nelson; USA | 12.58	Tiffany Porter; GBR | 12.66	Alina Talay; BLR | 13.38	Cindy Billaud; FRA | DNS
Women's 3000mSC	Habiba Ghribi; TUN | 9:11.28	Hyvin Kiyeng; KEN | 9:12.51	Virginia Nyambura; KEN | 9:13.85	Hiwot Ayalew; ETH | 9:14.98	Purity Kirui; KEN | 9:17.89	Gesa Felicitas Krause; GER | 9:20.15	Salima el Ouali Alami; MAR | 9:20.64	Tigest Getent Mekonen; BRN | 9:20.65
Women's high jump	Mariya Lasitskene; RUS | 2.00 m	Ruth Beitia; ESP | 1.97 m	Anna Chicherova; RUS | 1.97 m	Svetlana Shkolina; RUS | 1.91 m	Airinė Palšytė; LTU | 1.91 m	Kamila Lićwinko; POL | 1.91 m	Alessia Trost; ITA | 1.91 m	Erika Kinsey; SWE | 1.91 m
Women's long jump	Ivana Vuleta; SRB | 6.87 m	Tianna Madison; USA | 6.76 m	Lorraine Ugen; GBR | 6.73 m	Christabel Nettey; CAN | 6.68 m	Shara Proctor; GBR | 6.65 m	Janay Deloach; USA | 6.65 m	Darya Klishina; RUS | 6.57 m	Bianca Stuart; BAH | 6.49 m
Women's discus throw	Sandra Perković; CRO | 66.80 m	Dani Stevens; AUS | 65.21 m	Gia Lewis-Smallwood; USA | 63.97 m	Melina Robert-Michon; FRA | 62.39 m	Whitney Ashley; USA | 61.03 m	Zinaida Sendriutė; LTU | 57.16 m		

London
Event	1st +4 pts	2nd +2 pts	3rd +1 pts	4th ⠀	5th ⠀	6th ⠀	7th ⠀	8th ⠀
Men's 200m (-1.4 m/s)	Zharnel Hughes; GBR | 20.05	Dedric Dukes; USA | 20.14	Anaso Jobodwana; RSA | 20.20	Nickel Ashmeade; JAM | 20.24	Julian Forte; JAM | 20.25	Daniel Talbot; GBR | 20.56	Curtis Mitchell; USA | 20.64	Harry Adams; USA | 20.82
Men's 400m	Wayde van Niekerk; RSA | 44.63	David Verburg; USA | 45.01	Christopher Brown; BAH | 45.22	Isaac Makwala; BOT | 45.29	Youssef Ahmed Masrahi; KSA | 45.37	Rabah Yousif; GBR | 45.43	Martyn Rooney; GBR | 45.73	Pavel Maslák; CZE | 45.78
Men's Mile	Asbel Kiprop; KEN | 3:54.87	Matthew Centrowitz Jr. USA | 3:55.03	Ayanleh Souleiman; DJI | 3:55.06	Charlie da'Vall Grice; GBR | 3:55.27	Ben Blankenship; USA | 3:55.48	Henrik Ingebrigtsen; NOR | 3:55.51	Jakub Holuša; CZE | 3:55.66	Leonel Manzano; USA | 3:55.67
Men's 110mH (-1.5 m/s)	Jason Richardson; USA | 13.19	Pascal Martinot-Lagarde; FRA | 13.22	Ronnie Ash; USA | 13.26	Aries Merritt; USA | 13.32	Orlando Ortega; CUB | 13.32	Jeff Porter; USA | 13.53	Kevin Craddock; USA | 13.59	Lawrence Clarke; GBR | 13.67
Men's 3000mSC	Conseslus Kipruto; KEN | 8:09.47	Jairus Kipchoge Birech; KEN | 8:09.81	Paul Kipsiele Koech; KEN | 8:12.13	Hilal Yego; KEN | 8:13.10	Clement Kimutai Kemboi; KEN | 8:16.11	Andrew Bayer; USA | 8:18.08	Abel Kiprop Mutai; KEN | 8:21.46	Abraham Kibiwot; KEN | 8:22.10
Men's high jump	Marco Fassinotti; ITA | 2.31 m	Gianmarco Tamberi; ITA | 2.28 m	Mutaz Essa Barshim; QAT | 2.28 m	Erik Kynard; USA | 2.24 m	Robbie Grabarz; GBR | 2.24 m	Naoto Tobe; JPN | 2.24 m	Matúš Bubeník; SVK | NH m	JaCorian Duffield; USA | NH m
Men's long jump	Marquis Dendy; USA | 8.38 m	Zarck Visser; RSA | 8.21 m	Greg Rutherford; GBR | 8.18 m	Godfrey Khotso Mokoena; RSA | 8.16 m	Christian Taylor; USA | 7.95 m	Dan Bramble; GBR | 7.94 m	Kafétien Gomis; FRA | 7.43 m	Michael Hartfield; USA | NM m
Men's discus throw	Philip Milanov; BEL | 65.14 m	Robert Urbanek; POL | 64.47 m	Benn Harradine; AUS | 63.98 m	Piotr Małachowski; POL | 63.83 m	Vikas Gowda; IND | 63.69 m	Gerhard Mayer; AUT | 61.88 m	Apostolos Parellis; CYP | 61.07 m	Martin Kupper; EST | 61.04 m
Women's 100m (+0.1 m/s)	Dafne Schippers; NED | 10.92	Blessing Okagbare; NGR | 10.98	Murielle Ahouré-Demps; CIV | 11.01	Dina Asher-Smith; GBR | 11.06	Jeneba Tarmoh; USA | 11.10	Tianna Madison; USA | 11.12	Charonda Williams; USA | 11.14	Alexandria Anderson; USA | 11.23
Women's 800m	Eunice Jepkoech Sum; KEN | 1:58.44	Sifan Hassan; NED | 1:59.46	Lynsey Sharp; GBR | 1:59.57	Molly Ludlow; USA | 1:59.58	Chanelle Price; USA | 1:59.99	Angelika Cichocka; POL | 2:00.39	Shelayna Oskan-Clarke; GBR | 2:00.60	Selina Rutz-Büchel; SUI | 2:01.70
Women's 5000m	Mercy Cherono; KEN | 14:54.81	Molly Huddle; USA | 14:57.42	Janet Kisa; KEN | 15:10.66	Marielle Hall; USA | 15:19.96	Haftamnesh Tesfaye; ETH | 15:20.52	Emily Sisson; USA | 15:27.30	Rhona Auckland; GBR | 15:27.60	Kate Avery; GBR | 15:27.94
Women's 400mH	Zuzana Hejnová; CZE | 53.99	Georganne Moline; USA | 54.24	Cassandra Tate; USA | 54.36	Eilidh Doyle; GBR | 54.48	Wenda Nel; RSA | 54.81	Meghan Beesley; GBR | 55.37	Janieve Russell; JAM | 55.63	Tiffany Williams; USA | 55.71
Women's pole vault	Nikoleta Kyriakopoulou; GRE | 4.79 m	Anzhelika Sidorova; RUS | 4.79 m	Aikaterini Stefanidi; GRE | 4.62 m	Alana Boyd; AUS | 4.37 m	Mary Saxer; USA | 4.37 m	Marion Lotout; FRA | 4.37 m	Jennifer Suhr; USA | DNS m	Demi Payne; USA | DNS m
Women's triple jump	Olga Rypakova; KAZ | 14.33 m	Kimberly Williams; JAM | 14.15 m	Dana Velďáková; SVK | 13.66 m	Sineade Gutzmore; GBR | 13.54 m	Dovilė Kilty; LTU | 13.44 m	Jeanine Assani Issouf; FRA | 13.33 m	Lucie Májková; CZE | 13.27 m	Teresa Nzola Meso; FRA | 13.11 m
Women's shot put	Michelle Carter; USA | 19.74 m	Valerie Adams; NZL | 18.59 m	Cleopatra Borel; TTO | 18.53 m	Jillian Camarena-Williams; USA | 18.24 m	Brittany Smith; USA | 18.24 m	Anita Márton; HUN | 18.01 m	Felisha Johnson; USA | 17.94 m	Rachel Wallader; GBR | 17.08 m
Women's javelin throw	Madara Palameika; LAT | 65.01 m	Barbora Špotáková; CZE | 65.00 m	Kimberley Mickle; AUS | 63.39 m	Sunette Viljoen; RSA | 63.14 m	Kara Winger; USA | 62.97 m	Goldie Sayers; GBR | 62.09 m	Elizabeth Gleadle; CAN | 61.35 m	Margaryta Dorozhon; ISR | 59.27 m

Stockholm
Event	1st +4 pts	2nd +2 pts	3rd +1 pts	4th ⠀	5th ⠀	6th ⠀	7th ⠀	8th ⠀
Men's 200m (+0.3 m/s)	Alonso Edward; PAN | 20.04	Anaso Jobodwana; RSA | 20.18	Ramil Guliyev; TUR | 20.27	Terrel Cotton; USA | 20.30	Lykourgos-Stefanos Tsakonas; GRE | 20.43	Chris Clarke; GBR | 20.71	Karol Zalewski; POL | 20.71	Johan Wissman; SWE | 21.00
Men's 400m	Machel Cedenio; TTO | 44.97	Luguelín Santos; DOM | 45.21	Martyn Rooney; GBR | 45.41	Rabah Yousif; GBR | 45.46	Tony McQuay; USA | 45.49	Rusheen McDonald; JAM | 45.55	Abdalelah Haroun; QAT | 45.89	Edino Steele; JAM | 46.17
Men's 1500m	Ayanleh Souleiman; DJI | 3:33.33	Jakub Holuša; CZE | 3:34.26	Ilham Tanui Özbilen; TUR | 3:34.40	Fouad el Kaam; MAR | 3:35.05	Robby Andrews; USA | 3:35.52	Younéss Essalhi; MAR | 3:35.82	Henrik Ingebrigtsen; NOR | 3:36.06	Charles Philibert-Thiboutot; CAN | 3:36.37
Men's 110mH (-0.3 m/s)	Orlando Ortega; CUB | 13.18	Sergey Shubenkov; RUS | 13.22	David Oliver; USA | 13.24	Jason Richardson; USA | 13.31	Pascal Martinot-Lagarde; FRA | 13.40	Aleec Harris; USA | 13.54	Philip Nossmy; SWE | 14.18	
Men's 3000mSC	Hicham Sigueni; MAR | 8:16.54	Brahim Taleb; MAR | 8:16.56	Hilal Yego; KEN | 8:19.14	Andrew Bayer; USA | 8:19.84	Mitko Tsenov; BUL | 8:21.89	Ilgizar Safiulin; RUS | 8:24.13	Mohamed Ismail; DJI | 8:24.58	Stanley Kipkoech Kebenei; USA | 8:25.09
Men's high jump	JaCorian Duffield; USA | 2.32 m	Mutaz Essa Barshim; QAT | 2.29 m	Gianmarco Tamberi; ITA | 2.29 m	Erik Kynard; USA | 2.29 m	Marco Fassinotti; ITA | 2.25 m	Derek Drouin; CAN | 2.25 m	Donald Thomas; BAH | 2.25 m	Robbie Grabarz; GBR | 2.25 m
Men's long jump	Greg Rutherford; GBR | 8.34 m	Marquis Dendy; USA | 8.09 m	Godfrey Khotso Mokoena; RSA | 7.87 m	Michel Tornéus; SWE | 7.83 m	Andreas Otterling; SWE | 7.76 m	Eusebio Cáceres; ESP | 7.73 m	Zarck Visser; RSA | 7.71 m	Tomasz Jaszczuk; POL | 7.67 m
Men's discus throw	Piotr Małachowski; POL | 65.95 m	Philip Milanov; BEL | 64.97 m	Robert Urbanek; POL | 63.25 m	Axel Härstedt; SWE | 63.24 m	Daniel Ståhl; SWE | 63.03 m	Benn Harradine; AUS | 62.98 m	Gerhard Mayer; AUT | 60.49 m	Niklas Arrhenius; SWE | 59.48 m
Women's 100m (-0.2 m/s)	Shelly-Ann Fraser-Pryce; JAM | 10.93	Tori Bowie; USA | 11.05	Natasha Morrison; JAM | 11.22	Shalonda Solomon; USA | 11.24	Carina Horn; RSA | 11.24	Barbara Pierre; USA | 11.29	Tiffany Townsend; USA | 11.48	Moa Hjelmer; SWE | 11.91
Women's 800m	Rénelle Lamote; FRA | 1:59.91	Lynsey Sharp; GBR | 2:00.29	Brenda Martinez; USA | 2:00.54	Rababe Arafi; MAR | 2:00.73	Chanelle Price; USA | 2:01.26	Simoya Campbell-Johnson; JAM | 2:01.57	Rose Mary Almanza; CUB | 2:02.58	Molly Ludlow; USA | 2:02.67
Women's 3000m	Katie Mackey; USA | 8:52.99	Renata Pliś; POL | 8:53.58	Betlhem Desalegn; UAE | DQ	Mimi Belete; BRN | 8:53.96	Haftamnesh Tesfaye; ETH | 8:55.19	Karoline Bjerkeli Grøvdal; NOR | 8:57.78	Margherita Magnani; ITA | 9:02.08	Buzuayehu Mohamed; ETH | 9:06.23
Women's 400mH	Zuzana Hejnová; CZE | 54.37	Sara Slott Petersen; DEN | 54.42	Cassandra Tate; USA | 54.88	Georganne Moline; USA | 55.25	Wenda Nel; RSA | 55.26	Eilidh Doyle; GBR | 55.79	Tiffany Williams; USA | 57.03	Elise Malmberg; SWE | 57.13
Women's pole vault	Yarisley Silva; CUB | 4.81 m	Nikoleta Kyriakopoulou; GRE | 4.76 m	Fabiana Murer; BRA | 4.71 m	Silke Spiegelburg; GER | 4.61 m	Angelica Bengtsson; SWE | 4.46 m	Aikaterini Stefanidi; GRE | 4.46 m	Michaela Meijer; SWE | 4.31 m	Malin Dahlström; SWE | 4.16 m
Women's triple jump	Caterine Ibarguen; COL | 14.69 m	Olga Rypakova; KAZ | 14.30 m	Kimberly Williams; JAM | 14.22 m	Jenny Elbe; GER | 13.90 m	Jeanine Assani Issouf; FRA | 13.65 m	Sineade Gutzmore; GBR | 13.30 m	Jasmin Sabir; SWE | 12.83 m	
Women's shot put	Christina Schwanitz; GER | 20.13 m	Michelle Carter; USA | 19.24 m	Anita Márton; HUN | 18.74 m	Valerie Adams; NZL | 18.69 m	Brittany Smith; USA | 18.54 m	Cleopatra Borel; TTO | 18.25 m	Lena Urbaniak; GER | 17.62 m	Fanny Roos; SWE | 16.42 m
Women's javelin throw	Barbora Špotáková; CZE | 65.66 m	Sunette Viljoen; RSA | 64.03 m	Linda Stahl; GER | 64.02 m	Elizabeth Gleadle; CAN | 63.73 m	Madara Palameika; LAT | 61.76 m	Kara Winger; USA | 61.10 m	Katharina Molitor; GER | 60.52 m	Margaryta Dorozhon; ISR | 57.71 m

Zurich
Event	1st +8 pts	2nd +4 pts	3rd +2 pts	4th ⠀	5th ⠀	6th ⠀	7th ⠀	8th ⠀
Men's 200m (+0.4 m/s)	Alonso Edward; PAN | 20.03	Rasheed Dwyer; JAM | 20.20	Anaso Jobodwana; RSA | 20.24	Nickel Ashmeade; JAM | 20.35	Miguel Francis; ANT | 20.44	Isiah Young; USA | 20.55	Kenji Fujimitsu; JPN | 20.62	Daniel Talbot; GBR | 20.70
Men's 400m	LaShawn Merritt; USA | 44.18	Kirani James; GRN | 44.28	Wayde van Niekerk; RSA | 44.35	Luguelín Santos; DOM | 45.03	Rabah Yousif; GBR | 45.39	David Verburg; USA | 45.47	Isaac Makwala; BOT | 45.56	Steven Gardiner; BAH | 45.90
Men's 1500m	Asbel Kiprop; KEN | 3:35.79	Elijah Motonei Manangoi; KEN | 3:36.01	Robert Biwott; KEN | 3:36.04	Abdelaati Iguider; MAR | 3:36.11	Ronald Kwemoi; KEN | 3:36.60	Henrik Ingebrigtsen; NOR | 3:37.37	Caleb Mwangangi Ndiku; KEN | 3:38.13	Robby Andrews; USA | 3:38.78
Men's 110mH (+0.4 m/s)	Sergey Shubenkov; RUS | 13.14	David Oliver; USA | 13.30	Orlando Ortega; CUB | 13.30	Shane Brathwaite; BAR | 13.43	Mikel Thomas; TTO | 13.54	Jason Richardson; USA | 13.59	Pascal Martinot-Lagarde; FRA | 13.70	Dimitri Bascou; FRA | 14.07
Men's 3000mSC	Paul Kipsiele Koech; KEN | 8:10.24	Jairus Kipchoge Birech; KEN | 8:15.64	Evan Jager; USA | 8:18.39	Clement Kimutai Kemboi; KEN | 8:21.16	Brahim Taleb; MAR | 8:23.00	Conseslus Kipruto; KEN | 8:24.35	Brimin Kiprop Kipruto; KEN | 8:24.66	Matthew Hughes; CAN | 8:25.45
Men's high jump	Mutaz Essa Barshim; QAT | 2.32 m	Bohdan Bondarenko; UKR | 2.30 m	Zhang Guowei; CHN | 2.30 m	Andrii Protsenko; UKR | 2.23 m	Gianmarco Tamberi; ITA | 2.23 m	Jaroslav Bába; CZE | 2.23 m	Donald Thomas; BAH | 2.19 m	JaCorian Duffield; USA | 2.19 m
Men's long jump	Greg Rutherford; GBR | 8.32 m	Marquis Dendy; USA | 8.32 m	Fabrice Lapierre; AUS | 8.27 m	Jeff Henderson; USA | 8.22 m	Wang Jianan; CHN | 7.94 m	Godfrey Khotso Mokoena; RSA | 7.73 m	Christian Taylor; USA | 7.71 m	Aleksandr Menkov; RUS | 7.64 m
Men's discus throw	Robert Urbanek; POL | 65.78 m	Piotr Małachowski; POL | 65.04 m	Gerd Kanter; EST | 64.38 m	Philip Milanov; BEL | 63.04 m	Vikas Gowda; IND | 62.73 m	Apostolos Parellis; CYP | 62.62 m	Martin Wierig; GER | 62.02 m	Jason Morgan; JAM | 58.52 m
Women's 100m (-1.4 m/s)	Shelly-Ann Fraser-Pryce; JAM | 10.93	Blessing Okagbare; NGR | 10.98	Tori Bowie; USA | 11.06	Candyce McGrone; USA | 11.09	Michelle-Lee Ahye; TTO | 11.19	Veronica Campbell-Brown; JAM | 11.22	Natasha Morrison; JAM | 11.30	Kelly-Ann Baptiste; TTO | 11.30
Women's 800m	Eunice Jepkoech Sum; KEN | 1:59.14	Lynsey Sharp; GBR | 1:59.37	Fabienne Kohlmann; GER | 1:59.68	Sifan Hassan; NED | 1:59.95	Marina Arzamasova; BLR | 2:00.69	Rénelle Lamote; FRA | 2:00.75	Joanna Jóźwik; POL | 2:01.36	Brenda Martinez; USA | 2:02.00
Women's 3000m	Almaz Ayana; ETH | 8:22.34	Genzebe Dibaba; ETH | 8:26.54	Senbere Teferi; ETH | 8:34.32	Jenny Simpson; USA | 8:34.43	Mercy Cherono; KEN | 8:35.48	Vivian Jepkemei Cheruiyot; KEN | 8:38.91	Shannon Rowbury; USA | 8:39.92	Viola Jelagat Kibiwot; KEN | 8:41.93
Women's 400mH	Zuzana Hejnová; CZE | 54.47	Sara Slott Petersen; DEN | 54.57	Georganne Moline; USA | 54.89	Kaliese Carter; JAM | 55.29	Cassandra Tate; USA | 55.50	Wenda Nel; RSA | 55.82	Janieve Russell; JAM | 55.98	Eilidh Doyle; GBR | 56.14
Women's pole vault	Nikoleta Kyriakopoulou; GRE | 4.77 m	Yarisley Silva; CUB | 4.72 m	Fabiana Murer; BRA | 4.72 m	Nicole Büchler; SUI | 4.57 m	Aikaterini Stefanidi; GRE | 4.57 m	Silke Spiegelburg; GER | 4.57 m	Anzhelika Sidorova; RUS | 4.47 m	Sandi Morris; USA | 4.47 m
Women's long jump	Ivana Vuleta; SRB | 7.02 m	Tianna Madison; USA | 6.97 m	Shara Proctor; GBR | 6.58 m	Jazmin Sawyers; GBR | 6.55 m	Christabel Nettey; CAN | 6.46 m	Janay Deloach; USA | 6.40 m	Alina Rotaru-Kottmann; ROU | 6.37 m	Lorraine Ugen; GBR | 6.31 m
Women's shot put	Christina Schwanitz; GER | 19.91 m	Michelle Carter; USA | 19.12 m	Anita Márton; HUN | 18.42 m	Brittany Smith; USA | 18.39 m	Tia Brooks-Wannemacher; USA | 18.14 m	Aliona Dubitskaya; BLR | 17.74 m	Paulina Guba; POL | 17.59 m	Jillian Camarena-Williams; USA | 16.66 m
Women's javelin throw	Barbora Špotáková; CZE | 64.31 m	Elizabeth Gleadle; CAN | 62.70 m	Katharina Molitor; GER | 62.43 m	Madara Palameika; LAT | 62.22 m	Christin Hussong; GER | 61.44 m	Linda Stahl; GER | 60.98 m	Huihui Lyu; CHN | 60.36 m	Christina Obergföll; GER | 58.54 m

Brussels
Event	1st +8 pts	2nd +4 pts	3rd +2 pts	4th ⠀	5th ⠀	6th ⠀	7th ⠀	8th ⠀
Men's 100m (-0.4 m/s)	Justin Gatlin; USA | 9.98	Femi Ogunode; QAT | 9.98	Jimmy Vicaut; FRA | 9.99	Michael Rodgers; USA | 10.02	Asafa Powell; JAM | 10.04	Ramon Gittens; BAR | 10.11	Akani Simbine; RSA | 10.18	Chijindu Ujah; GBR | 10.19
Men's 800m	Adam Kszczot; POL | 1:45.12	Nijel Amos; BOT | 1:45.25	Amel Tuka; BIH | 1:45.45	Mohammed Aman; ETH | 1:45.49	Nader Belhanbel; MAR | DQ	Robert Biwott; KEN | 1:46.17	Antoine Gakeme; BDI | 1:46.82	Alfred Kipketer; KEN | 1:46.98
Men's 5000m	Yomif Kejelcha; ETH | 12:53.98	Hagos Gebrhiwet; ETH | 12:54.70	Abdelaati Iguider; MAR | 12:59.25	Thomas Pkemei Longosiwa; KEN | 12:59.72	Caleb Mwangangi Ndiku; KEN | 13:05.30	Yenew Alamirew; ETH | 13:05.53	Ben True; USA | 13:05.54	Ryan Hill; USA | 13:05.69
Men's 400mH	Jeffery Gibson; BAH | 48.72	Bershawn Jackson; USA | 48.76	Kariem Hussein; SUI | 48.87	Michael Bultheel; BEL | 49.66	Thomas Barr; IRL | 49.80	LJ van Zyl; RSA | 49.86	Nicholas Bett; KEN | 49.90	Bonface Mucheru; KEN | 50.75
Men's pole vault	Renaud Lavillenie; FRA | 5.95 m	Shawnacy Barber; CAN | 5.85 m	Konstantinos Filippidis; GRE | 5.80 m	Sam Kendricks; USA | 5.65 m	Robert Sobera; POL | 5.55 m	Raphael Holzdeppe; GER | 5.55 m	Paweł Wojciechowski; POL | 5.55 m	Tobias Scherbarth; GER | 5.40 m
Men's triple jump	Christian Taylor; USA | 17.59 m	Pedro Pichardo; CUB | 17.06 m	Lyukman Adams; RUS | 16.97 m	Omar Craddock; USA | 16.96 m	Nelson Évora; POR | 16.85 m	Tosin Oke; NGR | 16.66 m	Dmitriy Sorokin; RUS | 16.52 m	Pablo Torrijos; ESP | 16.14 m
Men's shot put	Tom Walsh; NZL | 21.39 m	O'Dayne Richards; JAM | 21.37 m	Joe Kovacs; USA | 21.35 m	David Storl; GER | 21.09 m	Ryan Whiting; USA | 20.58 m	Asmir Kolašinac; SRB | 20.35 m	Tomasz Majewski; POL | 20.34 m	Reese Hoffa; USA | 19.76 m
Men's javelin throw	Tero Pitkämäki; FIN | 87.37 m	Thomas Röhler; GER | 86.56 m	Keshorn Walcott; TTO | 84.03 m	Julius Yego; KEN | 83.82 m	Johannes Vetter; GER | 83.50 m	Vítězslav Veselý; CZE | 82.30 m	Andreas Hofmann; GER | 81.06 m	Ihab Abdelrahman; EGY | 80.45 m
Women's 200m (0.0 m/s)	Dafne Schippers; NED | 22.12	Allyson Felix; USA | 22.22	Elaine Thompson-Herah; JAM | 22.26	Candyce McGrone; USA | 22.52	Jeneba Tarmoh; USA | 22.88	Sherone Simpson; JAM | 23.12	Jodie Williams; GBR | 23.34	Olivia Borlée; BEL | 23.43
Women's 400m	Shaunae Miller-Uibo; BAH | 50.48	Francena McCorory; USA | 50.59	Stephenie Ann McPherson; JAM | 51.00	Natasha Hastings; USA | 51.02	Marie Gayot; FRA | 51.75	Christine Day; JAM | 51.96	Novlene Williams-Mills; JAM | 52.04	Floria Guei; FRA | 52.07
Women's Mile	Faith Kipyegon; KEN | 4:16.71	Sifan Hassan; NED | 4:18.20	Shannon Rowbury; USA | 4:22.10	Jenny Simpson; USA | 4:22.18	Mercy Cherono; KEN | 4:22.67	Abeba Aregawi; SWE | 4:23.07	Rababe Arafi; MAR | 4:23.50	Viola Jelagat Kibiwot; KEN | 4:24.31
Women's 100mH (+0.1 m/s)	Dawn Harper-Nelson; USA | 12.63	Sharika Nelvis; USA | 12.65	Jasmin Stowers; USA | 12.76	Tiffany Porter; GBR | 12.81	Cindy Roleder; GER | 12.91	Noemi Zbären; SUI | 12.96	Alina Talay; BLR | 12.99	Anne Zagré; BEL | 13.01
Women's 3000mSC	Habiba Ghribi; TUN | 9:05.36	Hyvin Kiyeng; KEN | 9:10.15	Sofia Assefa; ETH | 9:12.63	Hiwot Ayalew; ETH | 9:14.73	Purity Kirui; KEN | 9:17.74	Virginia Nyambura; KEN | 9:20.38	Stephanie Garcia; USA | 9:25.20	Emma Coburn; USA | 9:32.13
Women's high jump	Mariya Lasitskene; RUS | 2.01 m	Anna Chicherova; RUS | 1.97 m	Ruth Beitia; ESP | 1.93 m	Ana Šimić; CRO | 1.90 m	Isobel Pooley; GBR | 1.90 m	Nafissatou Thiam; BEL | 1.90 m	Kamila Lićwinko; POL | 1.90 m	Yuliia Levchenko; UKR | 1.85 m
Women's triple jump	Caterine Ibarguen; COL | 14.60 m	Hanna Minenko; ISR | 14.42 m	Yekaterina Koneva; RUS | 14.37 m	Kimberly Williams; JAM | 14.28 m	Olga Rypakova; KAZ | 14.26 m	Gabriela Petrova; BUL | 13.87 m	Jeanine Assani Issouf; FRA | 13.46 m	
Women's discus throw	Sandra Perković; CRO | 67.50 m	Denia Caballero; CUB | 65.77 m	Nadine Müller; GER | 62.64 m	Yaimé Pérez; CUB | 61.84 m	Julia Harting; GER | 60.68 m	Melina Robert-Michon; FRA | 60.58 m	Whitney Ashley; USA | 60.37 m	Shanice Craft; GER | 60.37 m

== Meeting highlights ==
=== Doha ===
Three Diamond League records were set in Doha during the opening competition of the series. Allyson Felix of the United States won the women's 200 metres with a run of 21.98 seconds to equal Veronica Campbell Brown's time which was set during the inaugural 2010 IAAF Diamond League season. Jasmin Stowers, making her debut on the circuit, broke the women's 100 metres hurdles record with a time of 12.35 seconds – this raised her to seventh on the all-time rankings for the discipline. The third record of the evening came in the men's triple jump: Cuba's Pedro Pablo Pichardo became the first person to go beyond eighteen metres in series history, setting a national record and Diamond League best of 18.06 m (59 ft 3 in). This placed him third on the all-time lists for the sport behind Jonathan Edwards and Kenny Harrison. The reigning Olympic champion, Christian Taylor, was runner-up and moved himself up to fourth on the all-time lists with a mark of 18.04 m (59 ft 2 in), making the contest the first in history to feature two men going beyond eighteen metres. Among the other results, Justin Gatlin of the United States became the fifth fastest man in the history of the 100 metres with his winning time of 9.74 seconds (bettering the world record of 9.77 seconds he set in 2006, which was annulled due to a failed doping test).

=== Shanghai ===
Almaz Ayana of Ethiopia gave the stand-out performance at the Shanghai Diamond League by running the third fastest women's 5000 metres of all time, finishing in 14:14.32 minutes for a Diamond League record. Mutaz Essa Barshim defeated Bohdan Bondarenko in the men's high jump with a meeting record and world-leading mark of 2.38 m (7 ft 9 1/2 in). In addition to these two performances, there were four other world-leading marks set during the competition: Silas Kiplagat (men's 1500 m), Jairus Kipchoge Birech (men's steeplechase), Gong Lijiao (women's shot put) and Nikoleta Kyriakopoulou (women's pole vault). Kyriakopoulou's vault of 4.75 m (15 ft 7 in) was also a Greek record. Aside from Gong, Lü Huihui was China's only other home nation victor, and her winning mark of 64.08 m (210 ft 2 3/4 in) from the women's javelin throw was also a meeting record.

=== Eugene ===
Renaud Lavillenie continued the streak of Diamond League records by winning the men's pole vault with a mark of 6.05 m (19 ft 10 in), raising him to joint second on the all-time outdoor lists. Wind and temperature conditions suited the sprinting events. Justin Gatlin won the men's 200 metres in a world lead 19.68 seconds, while Shelly-Ann Fraser-Pryce won the women's 100 metres in another world lead of 10.81 seconds, sharing that time with Murielle Ahouré. Six women ran under 10.9 seconds that day, and China's Su Bingtian became the first man of Asian descent to break the 10-second barrier in the 100 m. Mutaz Essa Barshim continued his high jump streak with a meet record and world lead of 2.41 m (7 ft 10 3/4 in), while Caterine Ibargüen extended her undefeated run to 24 triple jump competitions. Genzebe Dibaba attempted to top Almaz Ayana's 5000 metres run from Shanghai: although she came up short, her winning time of 14:19.76 was the fifth fastest ever run for the distance. A total of thirteen world-leading marks and six meet records were set at the two-day competition.

=== Rome ===
A total of five world leading marks were set at the Golden Gala. Ethiopian male distance runners provided two of these, with Mohamed Aman winning the 800 m in 1:43.56 minutes and 17-year-old Yomif Kejelcha taking his first Diamond race victory in the 5000 m with the first sub-13-minute run of the season. Hyvin Kiyeng Jepkemoi, also in her first Diamond race win, took the women's steeplechase in 9:15.08 minutes (a personal best by more than six seconds). The more experienced Ruth Beitia topped the women's high jump with a clearance of 2.00 m (6 ft 6 1/2 in) – the 36-year-old Spaniard became the oldest woman to jump over that height. American Jennifer Simpson became the first woman under four minutes for the 1500 m that year.

Two meeting records were bettered in Rome. Justin Gatlin knocked one hundredth off Usain Bolt's 2012 time with 9.75 seconds in the men's 100 m. Pedro Pablo Pichardo took down two much longer-standing marks in the men's triple jump with his jump of 17.96 m (58 ft 11 in): Jonathan Edwards 1998 meet record and also Khristo Markov's 1987 stadium record, which was the winning mark of the 1987 World Championships in Athletics. Other marks of note were Thiago Braz da Silva's South American record of 5.86 m (19 ft 2 1/2 in) in the men's pole vault and men's javelin throw national records from Kenya's Julius Yego and Olympic champion Keshorn Walcott of Trinidad and Tobago. A strong women's 100 m hurdles field was notable for high-profile failures: Olympic champion Sally Pearson fell heavily and was injured, world champion Brianna Rollins clashed a hurdle and fell, and world leader Jasmin Stowers also hit a hurdle heavily and walked to the finish.

=== Birmingham ===
The best performance at the Birmingham Grand Prix came in the men's javelin with Kenya's Julius Yego greatly improving to 91.39 m (299 ft 10 in) to break the Diamond League record and the African record. This mark was the best recorded in the discipline since 2006. There was some discussion over the validity of the throw: officials initially judged the throw to be outside the allowable sector, despite the throw going beyond the area that officials had marked out, and only was the meeting had finished did they accept Yego's effort. Another world lead and African record came in the non-standard 300 m sprint as Wayde van Niekerk won in 31.63 seconds.

Sandra Perković was the only athlete to set a meeting record, doing so in the women's discus with a mark of 69.23 m (227 ft 1 1/2 in), improving on former Olympic champion Ellina Zvereva's 13-year-old record. Perković win made her the only athlete of the meeting to have won all Diamond races in a discipline after just five meetings, as Marvin Bracy's 100 m win erased Justin Gatlin's streak. Home athlete Adam Gemili broke the 10-second barrier for the first time in that race, becoming the sixth Briton to achieve the feat.

=== Oslo ===
In poor weather conditions, there were few record performances in Oslo. Genzebe Dibaba fell short in her 5000 m world record attempt, although her winning time of 14:21.29 minutes was still the seventh fastest ever recorded at that point. The sole world-leading performance of the evening was Kaliese Spencer's 400 m hurdles win in 54.15 seconds. This brought the Jamaican to twelve points in the Diamond race. Caterine Ibargüen also reached twelve points, extending her three-year unbeaten run. No men were left unbeaten in their Diamond race due to two unexpected victories. A men's high jump billed as a contest between Mutaz Essa Barshim, Bohdan Bondarenko and Ivan Ukhov saw all finish outside the top two, as China's Zhang Guowei had his first Diamond League victory and Marco Fassinotti equalled the Italian record of 2.33 m (7 ft 7 1/2 in). Robert Urbanek ousted his fellow Pole Piotr Małachowski to prevent him from taking three straight wins in the men's discus. In the absence of Diamond race leader Kirani James, Steven Gardiner broke the men's 400 m streak and took his first Diamond League win.

The greatest upset of the night came through Laura Muir in the women's 1500 m. The Briton built up a 40-metre lead to have her first major circuit win ahead of the more favoured Abeba Aregawi. Marharyta Dorozhon was another first time winner, achieving the feat in the women's javelin in an Israeli record of 64.56 m (211 ft 9 1/2 in). The only other national record of the meet was a Belgian one of 3:51.84 minutes in the 1500 m by Pieter-Jan Hannes. Asbel Kiprop had his fourth career win at the Bislett Dream Mile, which was in its 50th anniversary.

=== New York ===
As in Oslo, poor weather meant only one world-leading mark was recorded in New York: Francena McCorory improved the women's 400 m time to 49.86 seconds – also a meeting record. The women's field events provided two more meeting records: Christabel Nettey's clearance of 6.92 m (22 ft 8 1/4 in) brought her her first long jump win on the circuit, while Ruth Beitia and Blanka Vlašić were both clear at 1.97 m (6 ft 5 1/2 in) for a women's high jump record. Ajeé Wilson brought an end to Eunice Jepkoech Sum's run in the women's 800 m and Sandra Perković became the first athlete of the series to gather four straight wins.

In a non-Diamond race, Usain Bolt extended his unbeaten record in the 200 m, although his winning margin was narrow and his time over a second off his best. Wayde van Niekerk took the men's 400 m in a South African record time. Nikoleta Kyriakopoulou of Greece also set a national record, but her pole vault clearance of 4.80 m (15 ft 8 3/4 in) left her second to Fabiana Murer on count-back.

=== Paris ===
Six world leading marks were established in Paris. Shelly-Ann Fraser-Pryce's 100 m in 10.74 was also a meeting record, as was Jairus Kipchoge Birech's steeplechase victory in 7:58.83. Nikoleta Kyriakopoulou's women's pole vault world lead also equalled the Diamond League record of 4.83 m (15 ft 10 in) and improved her Greek record. Eunice Sum (800 m), Orlando Ortega (110 m hurdles) and Silas Kiplagat (1500 m) were the others to set world leads.

Genzebe Dibaba and Almaz Ayana were both short again in a women's 5000 m world record attempt, although Genzebe's winning time of 14:15.21 was a new meet record. Three continental records were set at the meet: Wayde van Niekerk of South Africa ran an African record of 43.96 for the men's 400 m, France's Jimmy Vicaut was runner-up to Asafa Powell in the men's 100 m but equalled the European record at 9.86, while Evan Jager of the United States set a men's steeplechase record for the NACAC region. Jager did so despite a fall to the track at the last hurdle – a mistake that cost him the win over Birech and a certain sub-8 performance. A number of national records in athletics were also broken that day: Sergey Shubenkov improved the Russian record in the 110 m hurdles, Konstadinos Filippidis broke his nation's men's pole vault (a double for Greece in the event), Konstadinos Douvalidis equalled his Greek record in the 110 m hurdles, Selina Büchel improved the women's 800 m Swiss record to 1:57.95, and in the women's 400 m hurdles Sara Petersen and Kemi Adekoya broke their respective Danish and Bahraini records.

Two long-standing streaks were brought to an end at the competition. Valerie Adams, returning from surgery, lost to Christina Schwanitz in the women's shot put after having had 56 consecutive wins. Renaud Lavillenie was the favourite for the men's pole vault, but finished in fifth place and recorded his first loss in seven years at the meeting on home soil. Zuzana Hejnová won the 400 m hurdles to prevent Kaliese Spencer (who was absent) from taking a fourth straight win. One streak that did continue was that of Colombia's Caterine Ibargüen, who joined Sandra Perković as the only unbeaten athletes on the Diamond League that year.

=== Lausanne ===
The Athletissima meeting saw one world leading performance: 2.03 m (6 ft 7 3/4 in) by Anna Chicherova in the women's high jump. Four meet records were improved. Christian Taylor defeated Pedro Pablo Pichardo with a triple jump of 18.06 m (59 ft 3 in) – the joint fourth best jump ever at that point. David Storl's shot put of 22.20 m (72 ft 10 in) was another meet record and the best by a European since 1988. The women's steeplechase record was bettered by Virginia Nyambura, while Keshorn Walcott set a Trinidad and Tobago national record and meet record of 90.16 m (295 ft 9 1/2 in) in the men's javelin.

Yaime Pérez had her first ever Diamond League win and in doing so brought an end to Sandra Perković's unbeaten streak in the women's discus throw. Zharnel Hughes (men's 200 m) and Shaunae Miller (women's 400 m) also had their first ever wins on the Diamond League circuit.

=== Monaco ===
At the Herculis meet Genzebe Dibaba provided the highlight with her 1500 metres world record of 3:50.07 minutes, breaking Qu Yunxia's time from the 1993 Chinese Games. The veracity of the previous record had been subject to doubt and Genzebe's time—almost two and a half seconds faster than any time set outside the Chinese Games—attracted questions in addition to plaudits. In response, she said "I want to live my own history. I`m not interested in others or the conditions". Nearly six seconds behind her, Sifan Hassan set a Dutch record and Shannon Rowbury ran a North American record.

One other Diamond League record was improved that evening, by Joe Kovacs in the men's shot put whose throw of 22.56 m (74 ft 0 in) moved him to eighth on the all-time lists and was the best throw recorded in over a decade. Though not a Diamond race, the men's 1500 m saw Asbel Kiprop move up to third on the all-time lists with a run of 3:26.69 minutes. A total of six meeting records were broken – Habiba Ghribi's 9:11.28 in the women's steeplechase, Christian Taylor's 17.75 m (58 ft 2 3/4 in) men's triple jump, and Justin Gatlin's 9.78 in the men's 100 m, were the other three marks addition to the above-mentioned performances. A total of eight world-leading performances were recorded.

Amel Tuka (men's 800 m) and Candyce McGrone (women's 200 m) both won their first Diamond League races in personal bests, with Tuka improving over a second and a half in three races in July, breaking his own Bosnia and Herzegovina record and becoming the 11th fastest performer of all time. Following defeat at the previous leg, Sandra Perković returned for a fifth win in the women's discus.
