= Virginia Nyambura Nganga =

Kenyan runner (born 1993)

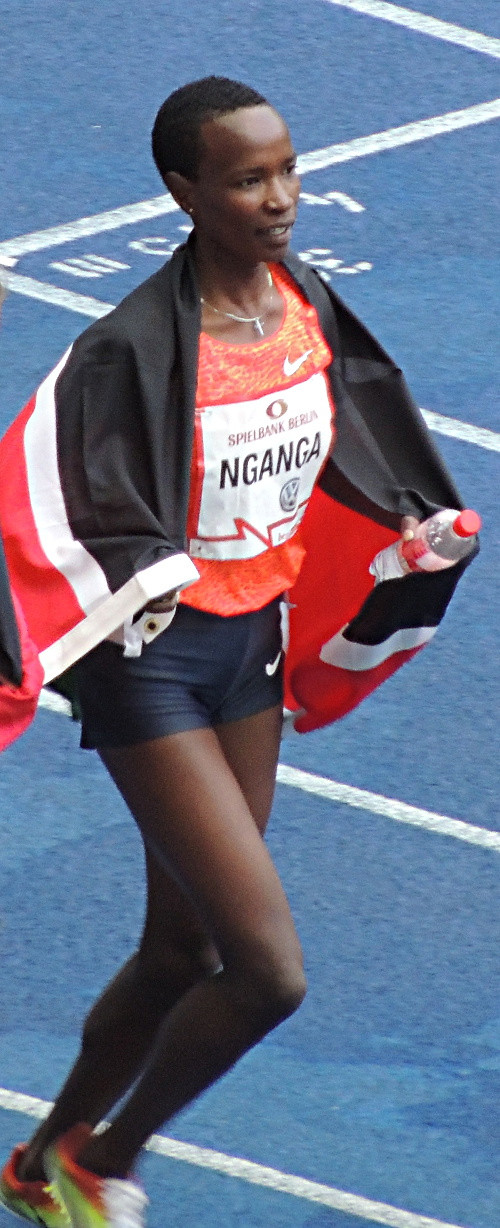

Medal record

Women's athletics

Representing Kenya

IAAF World Relays
Silver medal – second place	2015 Nassau	Distance medley relay

Virginia Nyambura Nganga (born 20 July 1993) is a Kenyan runner who specialises in the steeplechase. She was the gold medallist in the steeplechase at the 2010 Summer Youth Olympics and won her first senior medal at the 2015 IAAF World Relays, where she was a member of the Kenyan team which broke the African record for the distance medley relay. Her personal best for the 3,000 metres steeplechase is 9:13.85 minutes, set in 2015.

== Career ==
She began her career as a junior cross country runner, placing third at the 2008 Athletics Kenya series meet in 2008 and managing fifth at the 2009 Discovery Cross Country Championships. By the end of 2009 she had improved her best for the 3,000 metres steeplechase to 10:13.6 minutes. She won the Kenyan youth title in 2010 and, in her first international appearance, easily defeated her Ethiopian rival Tsehynesh Tsenga to the 2000 metres steeplechase gold medal at the 2010 Summer Youth Olympics.

She acted as pacemaker in IAAF Diamond League competition in 2013 and 2014, but showed her individual talent by winning the 2014 Abdijcross cross country meet. She paced the Glasgow Diamond League 3000 m steeplechase which resulted in a North American record, two national records, and a world youth best.

Nyambura was selected for the Kenyan distance medley relay for the 2015 IAAF World Relays – her first senior national call-up. She anchored the team to the silver medals behind a world-record breaking American team. As part of the Kenyan team, she helped break the African record and the Commonwealth record with their time of 10:43.35 minutes. She had her first major individual victory at the Doha leg of the 2015 IAAF Diamond League. Charged with pacing duties, she led up to 2,000 m, then continued the race to score a victory in a personal best of 9:21.51 minutes.

== Personal bests ==
- 1500 metres – 4:10.0 min (2015)
- 3000 metres steeplechase – 9:13.85 min (2015)
- 2000 metres steeplechase – 6:02.16 min (2015) AR
- Distance medley relay – 10:43.35 (2015) – team of Selah Jepleting Busienei, Joy Nakhumicha Sakari, Sylivia Chematui Chesebe and Nyambura

== International competitions ==
Year	Competition	Venue	Position	Event	Notes
2010	Youth Olympic Games	Singapore	1st	2000 m s'chase	9:21.51
2015	IAAF World Relays	Nassau, Bahamas	2nd	Distance medley race	10:43.35 AR
2015	World Championships	Beijing, China	7th	3000 m s'chase	9:26.21
