= Candyce McGrone =

American sprinter

Candyce McGrone (born March 24, 1989) is an American track and field athlete who competes in sprinting events. She holds personal records of 11.00 seconds for the 100-meter dash and 22.01 seconds for the 200-meter dash. She was second in the 200 m at the 2015 USA Outdoor Track and Field Championships.

She ran collegiately for Florida State University and the University of Oklahoma. She was the 2011 NCAA Women's Champion over 100 m.

== Career ==
=== Early life and college ===
McGrone grew up in Indianapolis, Indiana and attended Warren Central High School there. She competed in the 100-meter dash and 200-meter dash while at the school and was a finalist at the USATF Junior Championships in 2007 and 2008. She started a major in communications at Florida State University in 2008 and began running for their Florida State Seminoles track and field team. In Atlantic Coast Conference (ACC) competition, she was fifth in the 60-meter dash indoors and was the 100 m runner-up outdoors, as well as being the 4×100-meter relay champion with the college. The team of Nicole Marcus, McGrone, Danielle Jeffrey, and Teona Rodgers proved to be one of the best in the country that year, taking second place for the Seminoles at the NCAA Women's Division I Outdoor Track and Field Championships.

McGrone specialised in the 200 m for the 2010 season and improved her best by almost half a second to 22.84 seconds. She won the ACC Indoor title over the distance and placed third at the ACC outdoors. She made her individual NCAA debut that year, running in the heats at the NCAA Women's Division I Indoor Track and Field Championships and reaching the semi-finals of the 200 m at the 2010 NCAA Outdoor Championships. The Seminole relay team fell down the order at that event, failing to reach the final. McGrone competed for the first time at the USA Outdoor Track and Field Championships, but ran in the heats only. She also made her international debut and won a 200 m bronze medal behind Tiffany Townsend and Kimberly Hyacinthe.

Before the start of a third year at Florida, she transferred to University of Oklahoma and instead began to run for the Oklahoma Sooners team. At her first major meet, the Big 12 Conference indoor championships, she won the 200 m title and was a finalist in the 60 m. After she ran a personal record of 7.28 seconds for the shorter distance in the NCAA Indoor Championships heats, before taking the runner-up spot in the 200 m. She equalled her outdoor best of 22.84 seconds in the competition. She began to compete in both the 100 and 200 m in the outdoor season and managed to set a best of 11.17 seconds in the 100 m to win at the Drake Relays. At the Big 12 outdoors she was runner-up over 100 m and third in the 200 m and shortly after she ran a school record of 22.84 seconds for the 200 m. The 2011 NCAA Outdoor Championships saw McGrone reach the peak of her collegiate career: she was the surprise winner of the NCAA women's 100 m title in a school record of 11.08 seconds, edging out 200 m winner Kimberlyn Duncan by one hundredth of a second. She also finished fourth over the 200 m distance and ran in the heats of the relay. This helped the Oklahoma Sooner women's team to their highest ever finish at the championship, in fourth place. Her coach Dana Boone later reflected that training McGrone to the NCAA title was among the highlights of her coaching career.

=== Professional ===
After the college season, she entered the 2011 USA Outdoor Track and Field Championships and claimed sixth place in the 100 m. She made the decision to forgo the remainder of her time at college and immediately turned professional with the aim of getting selected for the 2012 Summer Olympics. In her first professional races, she won at the Hampton International Games then placed fourth in the 100 m at the DN Galan in Stockholm – her first outing on the IAAF Diamond League circuit.

A personal best of 7.21 seconds came at the 2012 USA Indoor Track and Field Championships, where she ranked sixth in the 60 m. McGrone ultimately failed in her Olympic attempt, being eliminated in the 100 m semi-finals at the 2012 United States Olympic Trials. She was three tenths of a second slower over the distance that year, and over half a second slower in the 200 m. She ended her 2012 season in June and did not return to competition until the following April as a result of an injury, but again she was far from her previous peak, failing to get past the first round of either sprint distance at the 2013 USA Outdoor Track and Field Championships. Her situation attracted comment from Tonja Buford-Bailey, coach to the University of Illinois, who advised college athletes to avoid those encouraging them to end college early and said such people had "ruined" McGrone.

McGrone's 2014 season was again injury affected and she only reached seasonal bests of 11.26 seconds for the 100 m and 23.43 seconds for the 200 m. She was again eliminated in the first round of the 2014 USA Outdoor Track and Field Championships.

Her fortunes were revived once she began working with new coach Dennis Mitchell and among her new training group was Justin Gatlin (the leading male sprinter in 2014), Isiah Young and world junior champion Kaylin Whitney. A change of diet and weight-loss saw her return to the peak of sprinting. In her first month of racing in 2015 she ran a world-leading time of 22.56 seconds – improving her previous best by a quarter of a second. She was some way off this pace at the New York Diamond League race, coming sixth, but reached new heights at the 2015 USA Outdoor Track and Field Championships two weeks later. In the 100 m she ran a personal record of 11.00 seconds in the heats before being narrowly eliminated in the semi-final with a wind-assisted 10.91 seconds. It was in the 200 m which she proved herself, finishing the final in another new best of 22.38 seconds to place runner-up behind Jenna Prandini. This earned her a place on the United States World Championships team. In July, she established herself on the international circuit by winning the Herculis 200 m race on the 2015 IAAF Diamond League with a time of 22.08 seconds – an improvement of three tenths of a second to raise her to second of the seasonal rankings after Allyson Felix.

== Personal bests ==
- 100-meter dash – 11.00 (2015)
- 200-meter dash – 22.01 (2015)
- 50-meter dash indoor – 6.28 (2012)
- 60-meter dash indoor – 7.21 (2012)
- 200-meter dash indoor – 22.84 (2011)

== International competitions ==
| Year | Competition | Venue | Position | Event | Notes |
|---|---|---|---|---|---|
| 2010 | NACAC U23 Championships | Miramar, United States | 3rd | 200 m | 23.16 w |
| 2015 | World Championships | Beijing, China | 4th | 200 m | 22.01 |

== Circuit wins ==
- IAAF Diamond League
  - Herculis 200 m: 2015
