= Jasmin Stowers =

American track and field athlete

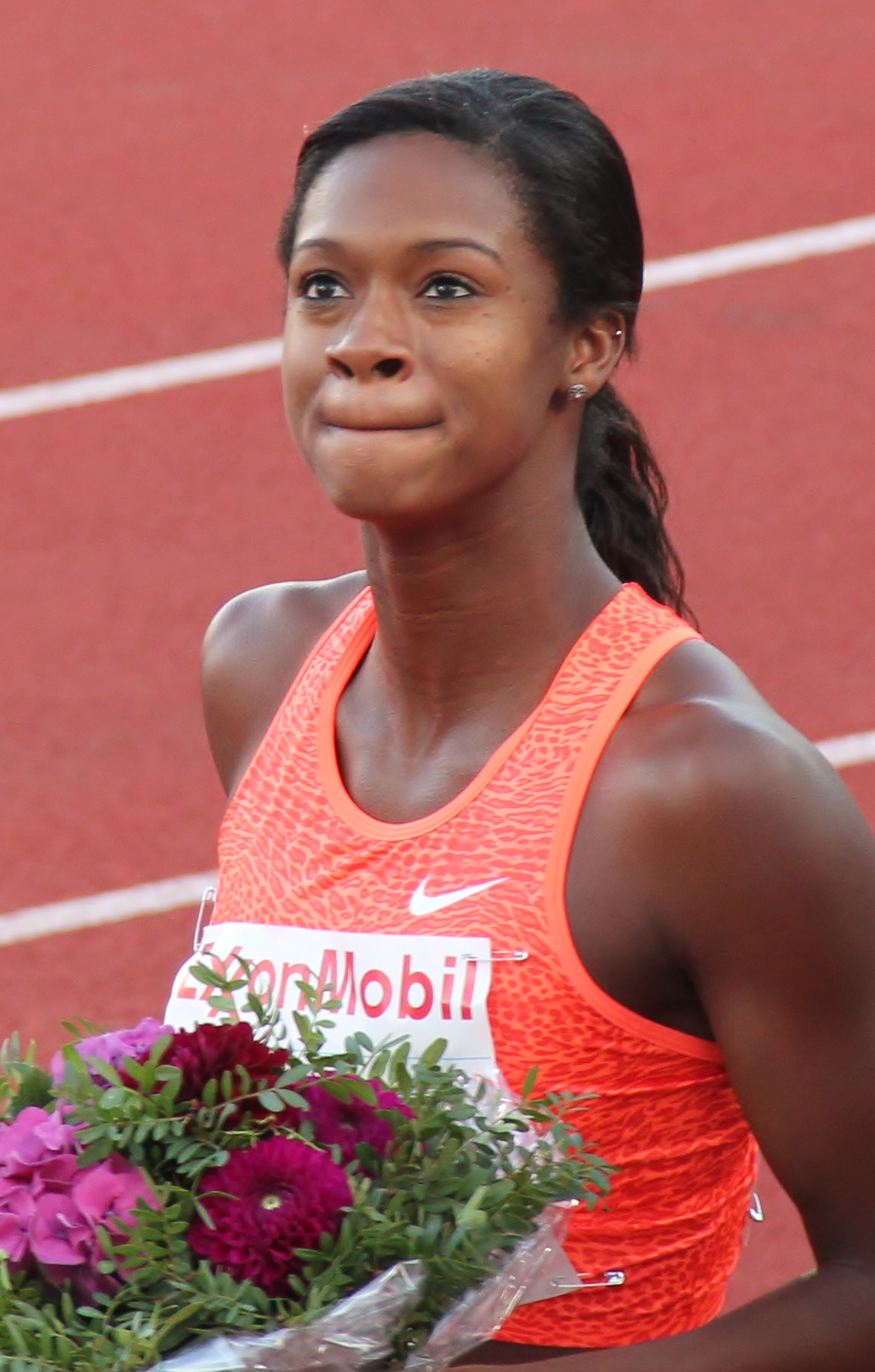
Stowers at the 2015 Bislett Games

Jasmin Marie Stowers (born September 23, 1991) is a former American track and field athlete, who competed in the 100-meter hurdles. Her personal best for the event is 12.35 seconds, set in 2015, which ranks her 14th on the world all-time lists.

Stowers ran for Louisiana State University in collegiate competition and was the 2014 NCAA runner-up outdoors. She was the 2015 American indoor champion in the 60-meter hurdles. Stowers represented her country at the 2007 World Youth Championships in Athletics. Stowers announced her retirement from the sport in October 2020.

== Early life ==
Born to Ronald and Gena Stowers, she grew up in Pendleton, South Carolina and attended Pendleton High School. She performed well in her studies there and was a member of her school's academic honor roll five years running, as well as serving as the school president for the National Honor Society. She took up track and field while at school and made her first international appearance at the age of fifteen, competing at the 2007 World Youth Championships in Athletics. There she ran a personal record of 13.52 seconds in the 100 m hurdles qualifiers, but was slower in the final and finished fourth in the youth event. She placed third in the 60 m hurdles at the Nike Indoor Nationals that same year.

She emerged at national level in 2008, winning the Nike Outdoor Nationals and taking second at the USATF Junior Olympics. She ranked as the number one high school athlete in the 2009 season, retaining her Nike Outdoor Nationals title in a time of 13.59 seconds and winning the Junior Olympics and Nike Indoor Nationals titles as well.

== College career ==
Stowers gained a scholarship to attend Louisiana State University and began to study Nutrition and Food Science there in 2010. She began to compete for the institution's LSU Lady Tigers track and field team and in her first major competition ranked sixth in the 60 m hurdles at the NCAA Indoor Women's Track and Field Championships with a personal best of 8.12 seconds. She was the winner of the Southeastern Conference (SEC) titles indoors and outdoors, setting a personal best of 12.88 seconds at the latter meet. She won at the Penn Relays and was a quarterfinalist at the NCAA Outdoor Women's Track and Field Championships. She also competed at the 2011 USA Outdoor Track and Field Championships, where she was a semi-finalist.

In her second year at Louisiana State, Stowers defended both her SEC titles and was a finalist indoors and out in NCAA competition. She won the Penn Relays for a second year running and ended the year with a best of 12.92 seconds for the 100 m hurdles. Reflecting her focus on studying, she was listed on the SEC Academic Honor Roll that year. At the 2012 United States Olympic Trials she was a semi-finalist. In 2013, she retained her SEC indoor title for a third time – only the second person to do so for Louisiana after Lolo Jones. She was again an NCAA finalist both indoors and outdoors, managing a third-place finish in the 60 m hurdles indoors. She suffered from a hamstring injury during the middle of the year, which contributed her defeat at the SEC Outdoor Championships. She again featured on the SEC Academic Honor Roll in 2013.

In her fourth and final college year Stowers featured in the top three in NCAA competition. At the 2014 NCAA Indoor Championships she ran a school record of 7.94 to take third place again in a tight race, where the top three (including Sharika Nelvis and Tiffani McReynolds) all finished within one hundredth of a second of each other. The 2014 NCAA Outdoor Championships bore similar results, as Stowers finished in a wind-assisted 12.54 seconds to place second behind Nelvis, who was just two hundredths ahead of her. She was usurped by Kentucky's Kendra Harrison in SEC competition, ranking second behind her both indoors and outdoors. Her third career win at the Penn Relays made her the first woman to achieve that feat. She ended the year on a high note at the 2014 USA Outdoor Track and Field Championships: after setting a personal record of 12.71 seconds in the qualifying round, she progressed to the final and finished in fourth place – her highest ever senior national ranking.

Stowers finished her collegiate career with five titles in Southeastern Conference competition and seven All-American honors in NCAA competition.

== Professional career ==
Stowers made a strong start to her professional career with a national title at the 2015 USA Indoor Track and Field Championships. Her winning time of 7.84 seconds took a tenth of a second off her previous best for the 60 m hurdles. No longer having to do both academics and sport, her new focus on hurdling brought results at the Drake Relays, where she moved up to twelfth on the all-time lists with a new personal record of 12.40 seconds – three tenths faster than she had gone before. She also defeated former Olympic champion Dawn Harper-Nelson and world champion Brianna Rollins in the process. She improved one hundredth further at the Jamaica International Invitational, with a meeting record of 12.39 seconds. Her debut appearance on the 2015 IAAF Diamond League circuit established her as an elite international performer. She won the Doha Diamond League meeting in a series record time of 12.35 seconds – this moved her up to seventh on the all-time rankings for the 100 m hurdles. In October 2020, Stowers announced her retirement on Twitter, citing an ongoing spinal injury that had severely hampered her ability to train and compete at the highest level.

== Personal records ==
- 100-meter hurdles – 12.35 seconds (2015)
- 60-meter hurdles – 7.84 (2015)

== National titles ==
- USA Indoor Track and Field Championships
  - 60-meter hurdles: 2015

== International competitions ==
Year	Competition	Venue	Position	Event	Notes
2007	World Youth Championships	Ostrava, Czech Republic	4th	100 m hurdles	13.70
