= Magdalyne Masai =

Kenyan long-distance runner

Personal information
- Nickname: Magz
- Nationality: Kenyan
- Born: Magdalyne Moraa Masai; 21 November 1993 (age 32) Kenya
- Occupation: long-distance runner
- Years active: 2013–present
- Spouse: Jake Robertson

Sport
- Country: Kenya
- Sport: Athletics
- Event(s): Marathon, Half marathon, 10 km, 3000 metres steeplechase
- Coached by: Jake Robertson (husband)

Achievements and titles
- Personal bests: Marathon: 2:18:58 (2024); Half marathon: 1:07:07 (2023); 10 km: 31:44 (2017); 3000 metres steeplechase: 9:29.16 (2015)

Magdalyne Moraa Masai (born 21 November 1993) is a Kenyan long-distance runner specializing in marathon and road races. She is known for her strong marathon performances, including her personal best of 2:18:58 at the 2024 Frankfurt Marathon. She is the sister of Linet Masai and Moses Masai, both world-class runners, and is married to New Zealand long-distance runner Jake Robertson.

== Career ==
Early in her career, Masai showed talent in cross country and shorter distances. She successfully defended her title at the Cross Zornotza in Amorebieta in 2014. She achieved a personal best of 1:07:07 for half marathon in 2023 and 31:44 for 10K road in 2017. She also competed in the 3000 metres steeplechase, recording a personal best of 9:29.16 in 2015.

Masai made her marathon debut in 2018 at the Hefei Marathon in China, winning the race in 2:28:22. In 2019, she finished second at the Hamburg Marathon with a time of 2:26:04. Later that year, she set a new Canadian All-Comers record at the 2019 Toronto Waterfront Marathon, winning in 2:22:16.

The 2024 season saw significant performances from Masai. She finished second at the Seville Marathon with a time of 2:22:51. She then secured a victory at the Lanzhou Marathon, clocking 2:24:46. Her standout performance of the year was at the 2024 Frankfurt Marathon, where she ran a personal best of 2:18:58 to finish second. This time placed her inside the previous course record, in a race where the course record was ultimately broken by Hawi Feysa.

== Personal life ==
Magdalyne Masai comes from a prominent running family, with her elder sister Linet Masai being the 2009 world 10,000m champion, and her elder brother Moses Masai a 2009 World Championship bronze medalist in the 10,000m.

Masai is married to New Zealand long-distance runner Jake Robertson, and they have a son. They often train together in Iten, Kenya.

== Achievements ==
Year	Race	Place	Position	Time
2013	Cross Zornotza	Amorebieta	1st	23:55 (6.7 km XC)
2018	Hefei Marathon	Hefei	1st	2:28:22
2019	Hamburg Marathon	Hamburg	2nd	2:26:04
2019	Toronto Waterfront Marathon	Toronto	1st	2:22:16
2024	Seville Marathon	Seville	2nd	2:22:51
2024	Lanzhou Marathon	Lanzhou	1st	2:24:46
2024	Frankfurt Marathon	Frankfurt	2nd	2:18:58
