= Aleec Harris =

American hurdler

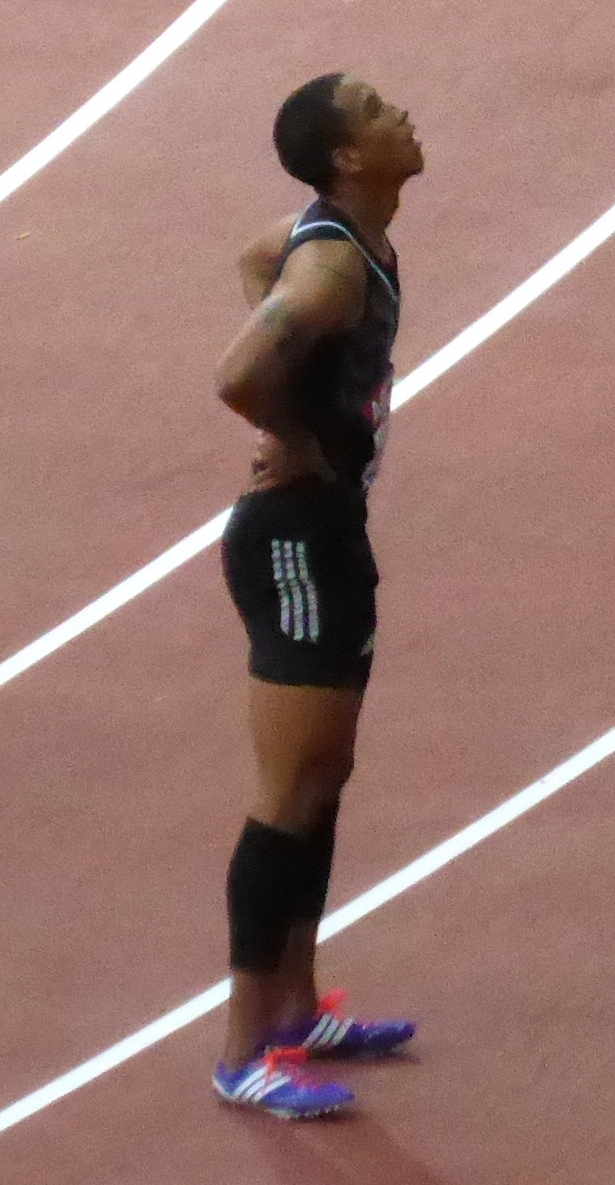
Aleec Harris in 2015

Aleec Harris (born October 31, 1990) is an American track and field hurdler.

== Amateur career ==
From Atlanta, Georgia, Harris was a Georgia state champion in high school.

Harris competed for the USC Trojans and at Barton Community College. At Barton Community College he was a NJCAA champion in the 110 meter hurdles.

At the 2014 NCAA Division I Indoor Track and Field Championships he finished 5th in the 60 meter hurdles.

At the 2014 NCAA Division I Outdoor Track and Field Championships he was runner-up in the 110 meter hurdles in a photo finish.

== National and international career ==
At the 2014 USA Outdoor Track and Field Championships Harris finished fourth in the 110 meter hurdles.

Harris won a senior national championship in the 60 meter hurdles at the 2015 USA Indoor Track and Field Championships.

At the 2017 USA Outdoor Track and Field Championships Harris finished first in the 110 meter hurdles, beating Aries Merritt and Devon Allen. While normally the top three runners qualify for the world championships, the event winner (David Oliver) earned a bye to the world championships by virtue of being the defending world champion. Therefore, Harris earned the final spot in his event to the 2015 World Championships in Athletics.
