= 2012 Meeting Areva =

- Dates: 6 July 2012
- Host city: Saint-Denis, France
- Venue: Stade de France
- Level: 2012 Diamond League

The 2012 Meeting Areva was the 28th edition of the annual outdoor track and field meeting in Saint-Denis, France. Held on 6 July at Stade de France, it was the seventh leg of the 2012 Diamond League – the highest level international track and field circuit.

== Diamond events results ==
Podium finishers earned points towards a season leaderboard (4-2-1 respectively), points per event were then doubled in the Diamond League Finals. Athletes had to take part in the Diamond race during the finals to be eligible to win the Diamond trophy which is awarded to the athlete with the most points at the end of the season.

=== Men's ===
100 Metres
Rank	Athlete	Nation	Time	Points	Notes
1st place, gold medalist(s)	Tyson Gay	United States	9.99	4	
2nd place, silver medalist(s)	Justin Gatlin	United States	10.03	2	
3rd place, bronze medalist(s)	Christophe Lemaitre	France	10.08	1	
4	Nickel Ashmeade	Jamaica	10.14		
5	Michael Frater	Jamaica	10.14		
6	Mike Rodgers	United States	10.16		
7	Trell Kimmons	United States	10.18		
8	Richard Thompson	Trinidad and Tobago	10.20		
9	Calesio Newman	United States	10.32		
			Wind: (±0.0 m/s)		

800 Metres
Rank	Athlete	Nation	Time	Points	Notes
1st place, gold medalist(s)	David Rudisha	Kenya	1:41.54	4	MR, WL
2nd place, silver medalist(s)	Antonio Reina	Spain	1:45.62	2	
3rd place, bronze medalist(s)	Alfred Kirwa Yego	Kenya	1:45.68	1	
4	Lachlan Renshaw	Australia	1:45.90		
5	Paul Renaudie	France	1:46.16		SB
6	Richard Kiplagat	Kenya	1:46.26		
7	Hamid Oualich	France	1:46.26		
8	Elijah Greer	United States	1:46.59		
9	Pierre-Ambroise Bosse	France	1:47.85		
—	Sammy Tangui	Kenya	DNF		PM

5000 Metres
Rank	Athlete	Nation	Time	Points	Notes
1st place, gold medalist(s)	Dejen Gebremeskel	Ethiopia	12:46.81	4	WL
2nd place, silver medalist(s)	Hagos Gebrhiwet	Ethiopia	12:47.53	2	WJR
3rd place, bronze medalist(s)	Isiah Koech	Kenya	12:48.64	1	PB
4	Yenew Alamirew	Ethiopia	12:48.77		PB
5	Thomas Longosiwa	Kenya	12:49.04		PB
6	John Kipkoech	Kenya	12:49.50		PB
7	Tariku Bekele	Ethiopia	12:54.13		SB
8	Eliud Kipchoge	Kenya	12:55.34		SB
9	Kenenisa Bekele	Ethiopia	12:55.79		SB
10	Edwin Soi	Kenya	12:55.99		SB
11	Moses Ndiema Masai	Kenya	12:59.21		
12	Muktar Edris	Ethiopia	13:04.34		PB
13	Mark Kiptoo	Kenya	13:06.23		SB
14	Hassan Hirt	France	13:10.68		PB
15	Yohan Durand	France	13:32.18		
—	Vincent Chepkok	Kenya	DNF		
—	Gideon Gathimba	Kenya	DNF		
—	Imane Merga	Ethiopia	DNF		
—	Remmy Limo Ndiwa	Kenya	DNF		PM

400 Metres hurdles
Rank	Athlete	Nation	Time	Points	Notes
1st place, gold medalist(s)	Javier Culson	Puerto Rico	47.78	4	WL
2nd place, silver medalist(s)	Dai Greene	Great Britain	47.84	2	PB
3rd place, bronze medalist(s)	Félix Sánchez	Dominican Republic	48.56	1	SB
4	Bershawn Jackson	United States	48.67		
5	Jehue Gordon	Trinidad and Tobago	49.03		
6	Omar Cisneros	Cuba	49.09		
7	Adrien Clemenceau	France	49.81		
8	Héni Kechi	France	50.15		

3000 Metres steeplechase
Rank	Athlete	Nation	Time	Points	Notes
1st place, gold medalist(s)	Paul Kipsiele Koech	Kenya	8:00.57	4	MR
2nd place, silver medalist(s)	Brimin Kipruto	Kenya	8:01.73	2	SB
3rd place, bronze medalist(s)	Abel Mutai	Kenya	8:03.15	1	
4	Jairus Birech	Kenya	8:03.43		PB
5	Brahim Taleb	Morocco	8:11.72		
6	Roba Gari	Ethiopia	8:13.65		
7	Hillary Yego	Kenya	8:15.33		
8	Jonathan Ndiku	Kenya	8:17.88		SB
9	Birhan Getahun	Ethiopia	8:18.63		SB
10	Mohamed Khaled Belabbas	Algeria	8:22.61		SB
11	Tomasz Szymkowiak	Poland	8:31.02		SB
12	Vincent Zouaoui-Dandrieux	France	8:36.01		
—	Bernard Nganga	Kenya	DNF		
—	Haron Lagat	Kenya	DNF		
—	Richard Mateelong	Kenya	DNF		

Pole vault
Rank	Athlete	Nation	Height	Points	Notes
1st place, gold medalist(s)	Renaud Lavillenie	France	5.77 m	4	
2nd place, silver medalist(s)	Konstantinos Filippidis	Greece	5.62 m	2	
3rd place, bronze medalist(s)	Björn Otto	Germany	5.62 m	1	
4	Malte Mohr	Germany	5.52 m		
4	Steven Lewis	Great Britain	5.52 m		
6	Maksym Mazuryk	Ukraine	5.52 m		
7	Jérôme Clavier	France	5.52 m		
8	Émile Denecker	France	5.52 m		=SB
—	Raphael Holzdeppe	Germany	NM		
—	Romain Mesnil	France	NM		

Triple jump
Rank	Athlete	Nation	Distance	Points	Notes
1st place, gold medalist(s)	Leevan Sands	Bahamas	17.23 m (±0.0 m/s)	4	SB
2nd place, silver medalist(s)	Karl Taillepierre	France	16.84 m (±0.0 m/s)	2	SB
3rd place, bronze medalist(s)	Harold Correa	France	16.76 m (+0.2 m/s)	1	PB
4	Jadel Gregório	Brazil	16.39 m (−0.3 m/s)		
5	Aliaksei Tsapik	Belarus	16.30 m (+0.3 m/s)		
6	Julien Kapek	France	16.04 m (+0.1 m/s)		
7	Alexis Copello	Cuba	15.91 m (+0.3 m/s)		
8	Karol Hoffmann	Poland	15.89 m (−0.2 m/s)		
9	Şeref Osmanoğlu	Ukraine	15.65 m (−0.4 m/s)		
10	Arnie David Giralt	Cuba	15.41 m (−0.5 m/s)		

Shot put
Rank	Athlete	Nation	Distance	Points	Notes
1st place, gold medalist(s)	Dylan Armstrong	Canada	20.54 m	4	
2nd place, silver medalist(s)	Joe Kovacs	United States	20.44 m	2	
3rd place, bronze medalist(s)	Kim Christensen	Denmark	20.02 m	1	SB
4	Marco Fortes	Portugal	19.85 m		
5	Nedžad Mulabegović	Croatia	19.81 m		
6	Dmytro Savyc'kyj	Ukraine	19.72 m		
7	Ladislav Prášil	Czech Republic	19.08 m		
8	Tumatai Dauphin	France	18.97 m		
9	Borja Vivas	Spain	18.84 m		

Javelin throw
Rank	Athlete	Nation	Distance	Points	Notes
1st place, gold medalist(s)	Oleksandr Pyatnytsya	Ukraine	85.67 m	4	
2nd place, silver medalist(s)	Vítězslav Veselý	Czech Republic	83.93 m	2	
3rd place, bronze medalist(s)	Jarrod Bannister	Australia	83.70 m	1	SB
4	Roman Avramenko	Ukraine	80.92 m		
5	Vadims Vasiļevskis	Latvia	80.31 m		
6	Fatih Avan	Turkey	78.30 m		
7	Ari Mannio	Finland	77.52 m		
8	Jérôme Haeffler	France	68.47 m		
9	Killian Duréchou	France	67.18 m		

=== Women's ===
200 Metres
Rank	Athlete	Nation	Time	Points	Notes
1st place, gold medalist(s)	Murielle Ahouré-Demps	Ivory Coast	22.55	4	
2nd place, silver medalist(s)	Bianca Knight	United States	22.64	2	
3rd place, bronze medalist(s)	Charonda Williams	United States	22.70	1	SB
4	Khrystyna Stuy	Ukraine	22.91		SB
5	Myriam Soumaré	France	22.95		
6	Natasha Hastings	United States	23.01		
7	Aleen Bailey	Jamaica	23.26		
8	Johanna Danois	France	23.27		
			Wind: (±0.0 m/s)		

400 Metres
Rank	Athlete	Nation	Time	Points	Notes
1st place, gold medalist(s)	Amantle Montsho	Botswana	49.77	4	
2nd place, silver medalist(s)	Novlene Williams-Mills	Jamaica	49.95	2	
3rd place, bronze medalist(s)	Francena McCorory	United States	50.27	1	
4	Christine Ohuruogu	Great Britain	50.59		SB
5	DeeDee Trotter	United States	50.93		
6	Rosemarie Whyte	Jamaica	51.07		
7	Marie Gayot	France	52.04		
8	Muriel Hurtis-Houairi	France	52.36		

1500 Metres
Rank	Athlete	Nation	Time	Points	Notes
1st place, gold medalist(s)	~~Mariem Alaoui Selsouli~~	~~Morocco~~	~~3:56.15~~	~~4~~	DQ (Note: Due to doping violations Selsouli's results during this competition were disqualified.)
2nd place, silver medalist(s)	~~Aslı Çakır Alptekin~~	~~Turkey~~	~~3:56.62~~	~~2~~	DQ (Note: Due to doping violations Alptekin's results during this competition were disqualified.)
3rd place, bronze medalist(s)	Abeba Aregawi	Ethiopia	3:58.59	1	
4	Viola Kibiwot	Kenya	3:59.25		PB
5	Btissam Lakhouad	Morocco	3:59.65		SB
~~6~~	~~Anna Mishchenko~~	~~Ukraine~~	~~4:01.16~~		DQ (Note: Due to doping violations Mishchenko's results during this competition were disqualified.)
7	Hellen Obiri	Kenya	4:01.43		
8	Lisa Dobriskey	Great Britain	4:02.13		SB
9	Siham Hilali	Morocco	4:02.59		SB
10	Maryam Yusuf Jamal	Bahrain	4:02.84		
11	Ingvill Måkestad Bovim	Norway	4:03.71		SB
12	Eunice Sum	Kenya	4:04.26		PB
13	Isabel Macías	Spain	4:04.84		PB
14	Hind Dehiba	France	4:09.09		SB
—	Anna Luchkina	Russia	DNF		PM

100 Metres hurdles
Rank	Athlete	Nation	Time	Points	Notes
1st place, gold medalist(s)	Sally Pearson	Australia	12.40	4	WL
2nd place, silver medalist(s)	Ginnie Crawford	United States	12.59	2	SB
3rd place, bronze medalist(s)	Tiffany Porter	Great Britain	12.74	1	
4	Kristi Castlin	United States	12.76		
5	Danielle Carruthers	United States	12.80		
6	Perdita Felicien	Canada	12.93		=SB
7	Alice Decaux	France	12.96		
8	Aïsseta Diawara	France	12.98		
9	Yvette Lewis	United States	13.00		
			Wind: (±0.0 m/s)		

3000 Metres steeplechase
Rank	Athlete	Nation	Time	Points	Notes
1st place, gold medalist(s)	Habiba Ghribi	Tunisia	9:28.81	4	MR
2nd place, silver medalist(s)	Lydiah Chepkurui	Kenya	9:29.02	2	
3rd place, bronze medalist(s)	Sofia Assefa	Ethiopia	9:29.57	1	
4	Zemzem Ahmed	Ethiopia	9:29.89		
5	Gülcan Mıngır	Turkey	9:30.02		
6	Hiwot Ayalew	Ethiopia	9:30.24		
7	Etenesh Diro	Ethiopia	9:36.41		
8	Barbara Parker	Great Britain	9:37.41		
9	Phanencer Chemion	Kenya	9:40.12		
10	Élodie Olivarès	France	9:49.44		SB
11	Lydia Rotich	Kenya	10:00.13		
12	Wioletta Frankiewicz	Poland	10:01.38		
—	Claire Perraux	France	DNF		
—	Purity Cherotich Kirui	Kenya	DQ		PM, R 169.7a

High jump
Rank	Athlete	Nation	Height	Points	Notes
1st place, gold medalist(s)	Chaunté Lowe	United States	1.97 m	4	
2nd place, silver medalist(s)	Olena Holosha	Ukraine	1.95 m	2	
3rd place, bronze medalist(s)	Ruth Beitia	Spain	1.92 m	1	
4	Emma Green	Sweden	1.92 m		=SB
5	Marie-Laurence Jungfleisch	Germany	1.92 m		=SB
6	Nadiya Dusanova	Uzbekistan	1.92 m		SB
7	Marina Aitova	Kazakhstan	1.89 m		
8	Anna Iljuštšenko	Estonia	1.85 m		

Long jump
Rank	Athlete	Nation	Distance	Points	Notes
1st place, gold medalist(s)	Yelena Sokolova	Russia	6.70 m (+0.3 m/s)	4	
2nd place, silver medalist(s)	Shara Proctor	Great Britain	6.65 m (+0.2 m/s)	2	
3rd place, bronze medalist(s)	Éloyse Lesueur-Aymonin	France	6.56 m (+0.1 m/s)	1	
4	Janay DeLoach Soukup	United States	6.50 m (+0.7 m/s)		
5	Funmi Jimoh	United States	6.35 m (+0.7 m/s)		
6	Viktoriya Rybalko	Ukraine	6.32 m (+0.4 m/s)		
7	Volha Sudarava	Belarus	6.32 m (+0.5 m/s)		
8	Whitney Gipson	United States	6.28 m (+0.6 m/s)		

Discus throw
Rank	Athlete	Nation	Distance	Points	Notes
1st place, gold medalist(s)	Dani Stevens	Australia	61.81 m	4	
2nd place, silver medalist(s)	Sandra Elkasević	Croatia	61.46 m	2	
3rd place, bronze medalist(s)	Mélina Robert-Michon	France	61.04 m	1	
4	Natalia Semenova	Ukraine	59.93 m		
5	Zinaida Sendriūtė	Lithuania	59.56 m		
6	Yarelys Barrios	Cuba	58.49 m		
7	Aretha Thurmond	United States	57.72 m		
8	Nicoleta Grasu	Romania	55.59 m		
—	Denia Caballero	Cuba	NM		

== See also ==
- 2012 Diamond League
