= 2012 Diamond League =

2012 IAAF Diamond League
- Edition: 3rd
- Dates: 11 May–7 September
- Events: 32
- Meetings: 14
- Records set: 1

The 2012 IAAF Diamond League (also known as the 2012 Samsung Diamond League for sponsorship purposes) was the third edition of the Diamond League, an annual series of fourteen one-day track and field meetings.

The series began on 11 May in Doha, Qatar, and ended on 7 September in Brussels, Belgium.

== Meeting calendar ==
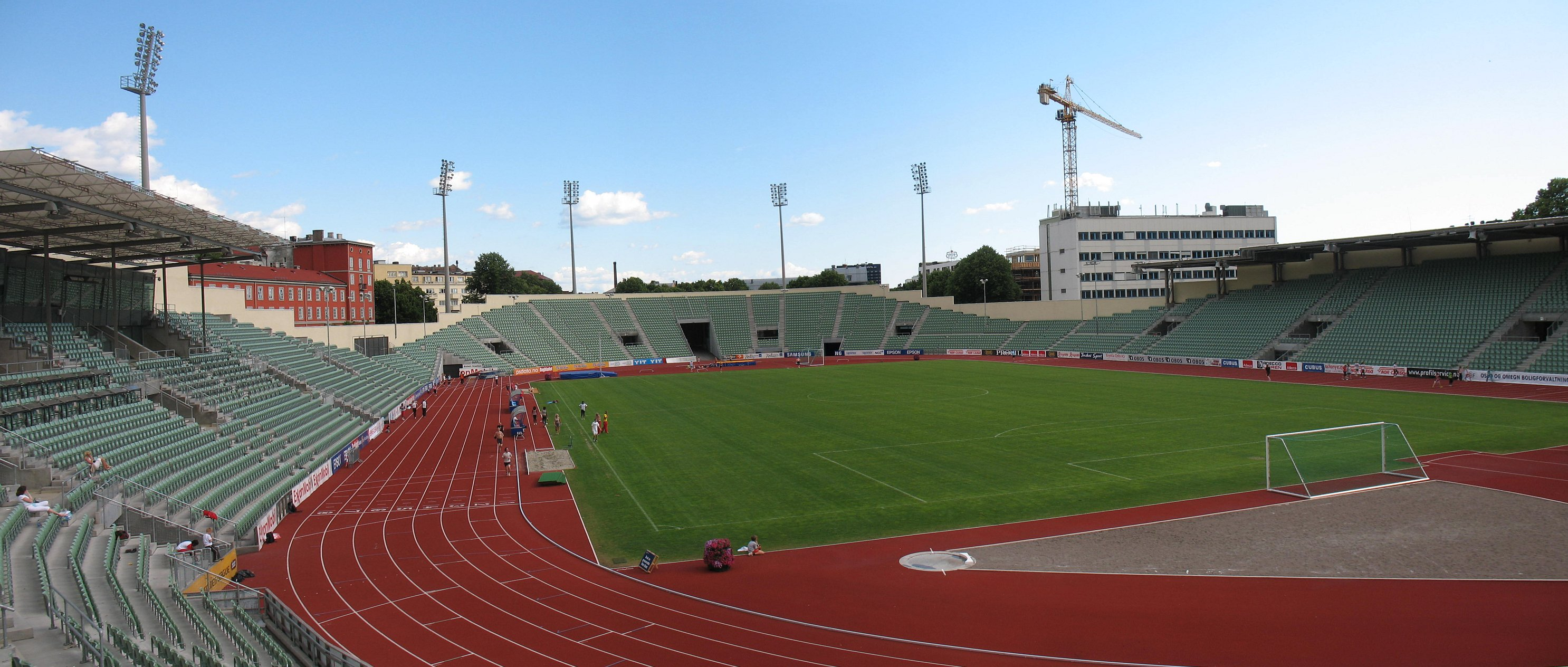
The Bislett Games have been held at Bislett Stadion since 1965.

Date	Meet	Stadium	City	Country
11 May	Qatar Athletic Super Grand Prix	Qatar SC Stadium	Doha	Qatar
19 May	Shanghai Golden Grand Prix	Shanghai Stadium	Shanghai	China
31 May	Golden Gala	Stadio Olimpico	Rome	Italy
2 June	Prefontaine Classic	Hayward Field	Eugene	United States
7 June	Bislett Games	Bislett Stadion	Oslo	Norway
9 June	Adidas Grand Prix	Icahn Stadium	New York City	United States
6 July	Meeting Areva	Stade de France	Saint-Denis	France
13–14 July	London Grand Prix	Crystal Palace National Sports Centre	London	United Kingdom
20 July	Herculis	Stade Louis II	Fontvieille	Monaco
17 August	DN Galan	Stockholm Olympic Stadium	Stockholm	Sweden
23 August	Athletissima	Stade Olympique de la Pontaise	Lausanne	Switzerland
26 August	Aviva British Grand Prix	Alexander Stadium	Birmingham	United Kingdom
30 August	Weltklasse Zürich	Letzigrund	Zürich	Switzerland
7 September	Memorial van Damme	King Baudouin Stadium	Brussels	Belgium

== Winners ==
Diamond Race track events
Men	100 m	200 m	400 m	800 m	1500 m / Mile	5000 m	110 m hurdles	400 m hurdles	3000 m steeplechase
Women	100 m	200 m	400 m	800 m	1500 m	5000 m	100 m hurdles	400 m hurdles	3000 m steeplechase

Diamond Race field events
Men	Pole vault	High jump	Long jump	Triple jump	Shot put	Discus throw	Javelin throw
Women	Pole vault	High jump	Long jump	Triple jump	Shot put	Discus throw	Javelin throw

Events not included in the Diamond League are marked in grey background in the below tables.

=== Men ===
==== Track ====
#	Meeting	100 m	200 m	400 m	800 m	1500 m	5000 m	110 m h	400 m h	3000 m st
1	Doha	Justin Gatlin (USA); 9.87	Walter Dix (USA); 20.02 MR	LaShawn Merritt (USA); 44.19 WL, MR	–	Silas Kiplagat (KEN); 3:29.63 WL	–	–	–	Paul Kipsiele Koech (KEN); 7:56.58 WL, MR
2	Shanghai	Asafa Powell (JAM); 10.02	–	–	Leonard Kirwa Kosencha (KEN); 1:46.04	–	Hagos Gebrhiwet (ETH); 13:11.00 WL, MR	Liu Xiang (CHN); 12.97 WL, MR	Angelo Taylor (USA); 48.98 SB	–
3	Rome	Usain Bolt (JAM); 9.76 MR	–	–	–	–	–	–	Javier Culson (PUR); 48.14	Paul Kipsiele Koech (KEN); 7:54.31 WL, MR
4	Eugene	Justin Gatlin (USA); 9.90	Wallace Spearmon (USA); 20.27	LaShawn Merritt (USA); 44.91	Abubaker Kaki Khamis (SUD); 1:43.71	Asbel Kiprop (KEN); 3:49.40 WL	Mo Farah (GBR); 12:56.98 WL, MR	Liu Xiang (CHN); 12.87w	–	
5	Oslo	Usain Bolt (JAM); 9.79 MR	–	–	–	Asbel Kiprop (KEN); 3:49.22 WL	Dejen Gebremeskel (ETH); 12:58.92	–	Javier Culson (PUR); 47.92 WL	–
6	New York	Yohan Blake (JAM); 9.90	Churandy Martina (NED); 19.94 NR	Luguelín Santos (DOM); 45.24	David Rudisha (KEN); 1:41.74 WL, MR	–	–	Jason Richardson (USA); 13.18	–	–
7	Paris	Tyson Gay (USA); 9.99	–	–	David Rudisha (KEN); 1:41.54	–	Dejen Gebremeskel (ETH); 12:46.81	–	Javier Culson (PUR); 47.78 WL	Paul Kipsiele Koech (KEN); 8:00.57
8	London	Tyson Gay (USA); 10.03	Christophe Lemaitre (FRA); 19.91 SB	Kirani James (GRN); 44.85	Adam Kszczot (POL); 1:44.49	–	Mo Farah (GBR); 13:06.04	Aries Merritt (USA); 12.93 =WL, MR	Javier Culson (PUR); 47.78 =WL	–
9	Monaco	–	Nickel Ashmeade (JAM); 20.02	Jonathan Borlée (BEL); 44.74 SB	Abraham Kipchirchir Rotich (KEN); 1:43.13 PB	Asbel Kiprop (KEN); 3:28.88 WL	–	Aries Merritt (USA); 12.93 =WL, MR	–	Conseslus Kipruto (KEN); 8:03.49 PB
10	Stockholm	Ryan Bailey (USA); 9.93	–	–	Mohammed Aman (ETH); 1:43.56	–	Isaiah Kiplangat Koech (KEN); 7:30.43 PB	–	Michael Tinsley (USA); 48.50	–
11	Lausanne	Yohan Blake (JAM); 9.69 MR, PB	Usain Bolt (JAM); 19.58 MR	Kirani James (GRN); 44.37	–	Silas Kiplagat (KEN); 3:31.78	–	Jason Richardson (USA); 13.08	–	Paul Kipsiele Koech (KEN); 8:05.80
12	Birmingham	–	Nickel Ashmeade (JAM); 20.12	Angelo Taylor (USA); 44.93 SB	–	Mekonnen Gebremedhin (ETH); 3:34.80	–	Aries Merritt (USA); 12.95 MR	–	Jairus Kipchoge Birech (KEN); 8:20.27
13	Zürich	Yohan Blake (JAM); 9.76 MR	Usain Bolt (JAM); 19.66 MR	–	Mohammed Aman (ETH); 1:42.53 NR, PB	–	Isiah Kiplangat Koech (KEN); 12:58.98	–	Angelo Taylor (USA); 48.29	–
14	Brussels	Usain Bolt (JAM); 9.86	Yohan Blake (JAM); 19.54	Kevin Borlée (BEL); 44.75	–	Silas Kiplagat (KEN); 3:31.98	–	Aries Merritt (USA); 12.80 WR	–	Brimin Kiprop Kipruto (KEN); 8:03.11
Overall winner		Usain Bolt (JAM)	Nickel Ashmeade (JAM)	Kevin Borlée (BEL)	Mohammed Aman (ETH)	Silas Kiplagat (KEN)	Isaiah Kiplangat Koech (KEN)	Aries Merritt (USA)	Javier Culson (PUR)	Paul Kipsiele Koech (KEN)

- In Eugene and Oslo, mile races are counted to the Diamond League standings for the 1500 metres.
- In Stockholm, 3000m race is counted to the Diamond League standings for the 5000m metres.

==== Field ====
#	Meeting	Long jump	Triple jump	High jump	Pole vault	Shot put	Discus	Javelin
1	Doha	Aleksandr Menkov (RUS); 8.22	–	Dimitrios Chondrokoukis (GRE); 2.32 =WL	–	–	Piotr Małachowski (POL); 67.53 SB	–
2	Shanghai	–	Phillips Idowu (GBR); 17.24 MR	–	Yang Yansheng (CHN); 5.65 SB	Reese Hoffa (USA); 20.98	–	Vítězslav Veselý (CZE); 85.40 SB
3	Rome	Greg Rutherford (GBR); 8.32	–	Robert Grabarz (GBR); 2.33 WL	Renaud Lavillenie (FRA); 5.82	–	Ehsan Haddadi (IRI); 66.73	–
4	Eugene	–	Christian Taylor (USA); 17.62 WL, MR	–	–	Reese Hoffa (USA); 21.81 WL	–	Vadims Vasiļevskis (LAT); 84.65 MR
5	Oslo	–	Lyukman Adams (RUS); 17.09	–	Renaud Lavillenie (FRA); 5.82	Tomasz Majewski (POL); 21.36	–	Vítězslav Veselý (CZE); 88.11 WL
6	New York	Mitchell Watt (AUS); 8.16 MR	–	Jesse Williams (USA); 2.36 MR	–	–	Frank Casañas (ESP); 65.21	–
7	Paris	–	Leevan Sands (BAH); 17.23	–	Renaud Lavillenie (FRA); 5.77	Dylan Armstrong (CAN); 20.54	–	Oleksandr Pyatnytsya (UKR); 85.67
8	London	Mitchell Watt (AUS); 8.28	Christian Taylor (USA); 17.41	Derek Drouin (CAN); 2.26	Björn Otto (GER); 5.74	Reese Hoffa (USA); 21.34	Gerd Kanter (EST); 64.85	–
9	Monaco	Irving Saladino (PAN); 8.16 SB	–	Jesse Williams (USA); 2.33	–	–	–	Oleksandr Pyatnytsya (UKR); 82.85
10	Stockholm	–	Christian Taylor (USA); 17.11	–	-	Reese Hoffa (USA); 21.24	–	Tero Pitkämäki (FIN); 86.98
11	Lausanne	–	–	Mutaz Essa Barshim (QAT); 2.39 =AR, =WL, MR	Renaud Lavillenie (FRA); 5.80	–	Gerd Kanter (EST); 65.79	–
12	Birmingham	Aleksandr Menkov (RUS); 8.18	–	Robert Grabarz (GBR); 2.32	–	–	Robert Harting (GER); 66.64	–
13	Zürich	–	Fabrizio Donato (ITA); 17.29	Robbie Grabarz (GBR); 2.28	Renaud Lavillenie (FRA); 5.70	Reese Hoffa (USA); 21.64	–	Tero Pitkämäki (FIN); 85.27
14	Brussels	Aleksandr Menkov (RUS); 8.29	-	–	–	–	Gerd Kanter (EST); 66.84	–
Overall winner		Aleksandr Menkov (RUS)	Christian Taylor (USA)	Robert Grabarz (GBR)	Renaud Lavillenie (FRA)	Reese Hoffa (USA)	Gerd Kanter (EST)	Vítězslav Veselý (CZE)

=== Women ===
==== Track ====
#	Meeting	100 m	200 m	400 m	800 m	1500 m	5000 m	100 m h	400 m h	3000 m st
1	Doha	Allyson Felix (USA); 10.92 MR	–	–	Pamela Jelimo (KEN); 1:56.94 WL, MR	–	Vivian Cheruiyot (KEN); 8:46.44 WL	Brigitte Foster-Hylton (JAM); 12.60	Melaine Walker (JAM); 54.62 WL	–
2	Shanghai	–	Veronica Campbell-Brown (JAM); 22.50w	Novlene Williams-Mills (JAM); 50.00	–	Genzebe Dibaba (ETH); 3:57.77 WL, MR, NR	–	–	–	Milcah Cheywa (KEN); 9:15.81 WL, MR
3	Rome	Murielle Ahouré (CIV); 11.00 NR	–	–	Fantu Magiso (ETH); 1:57.56 NR	Abeba Aregawi (ETH); 3:56.54 WL, MR, NR	Vivian Cheruiyot (KEN); 14:35.62 WL	Dawn Harper (USA); 12.66	Kaliese Spencer (JAM); 54.39 SB	–
4	Eugene	–	Allyson Felix (USA); 22.23	Sanya Richards-Ross (USA); 49.39 WL	–	–	–	–	–	Milcah Cheywa (KEN); 9:13.69 WL, MR
5	Oslo	–	Murielle Ahouré (CIV); 22.42 NR	Amantle Montsho (BOT); 49.68	–	Abeba Aregawi (ETH); 4:02.42	–	Sally Pearson (AUS); 12.49 =WL, MR	–	Milcah Cheywa (KEN); 9:07.14 AR, MR
6	New York	Shelly-Ann Fraser-Pryce (JAM); 10.92 SB	–	–	Fantu Magiso (ETH); 1:57.48 MR, NR	–	Tirunesh Dibaba (ETH); 14:50.80	–	T'erea Brown (USA); 54.85 MR	–
7	Paris	–	Murielle Ahouré (CIV); 22.55	Amantle Montsho (BOT); 49.77	–	Mariem Selsouli (MAR); 3:56.15	–	Sally Pearson (AUS); 12.40	–	Habiba Ghribi (TUN); 9:28.81
8	London	Blessing Okagbare (NGR); 11.01	Charonda Williams (USA); 22.75	Christine Ohuruogu (GBR); 50.42	Molly Beckwith (USA); 2:00.68	Maryam Yusuf Jamal (BHR); 4:06.78	Vivian Cheruiyot (KEN); 14:48.86	Kellie Wells (USA); 12.57	Perri Shakes-Drayton (GBR); 53.77 PB	Ancuţa Bobocel (ROM); 9:27.24 PB
9	Monaco	Blessing Okagbare (NGR); 10.96 PB	–	–	Elena Kofanova (RUS); 1:58.41	–	Mercy Cherono (KEN); 8:38.51	–	Zuzana Hejnová (CZE); 54.12 SB	–
10	Stockholm	–	ChaRonda Williams (USA); 22.82	Sanya Richards-Ross (USA); 49.89	–	Maryam Yusuf Jamal (BHR); 4:01.19	–	Dawn Harper (USA); 12.65	–	Habiba Ghribi (TUN); 9:10.36
11	Lausanne	Carmelita Jeter (USA); 10.86	–	–	Pamela Jelimo (KEN); 1:57.59	–	Mercy Cherono (KEN); 8:40.59	Dawn Harper (USA); 12.43	Kaliese Spencer (JAM); 53.49 SB	–
12	Birmingham	Carmelita Jeter (USA); 10.81 MR	–	Rosemarie Whyte (JAM); 50.20 SB	Pamela Jelimo (KEN); 2:01.43	Anna Pierce (USA); 4:11.33	Mercy Cherono (KEN); 8:41.21	–	Kaliese Spencer (JAM); 53.78 MR	–
13	Zürich	Shelly-Ann Fraser-Pryce (JAM); 10.83	–	Sanya Richards-Ross (USA); 50.21	–	Abeba Aregawi (ETH); 4:05.29	–	Dawn Harper (USA); 12.59	–	Etenesh Diro Neda (ETH); 9:24.97 MR
14	Brussels	–	Myriam Soumaré (FRA); 22.63	–	Francine Niyonsaba (BDI); 1:56.59 NR	–	Vivian Cheruiyot (KEN); 14:46.01	–	Kaliese Spencer (JAM); 53.69	–
Overall winner		Shelly-Ann Fraser-Pryce (JAM)	ChaRonda Williams (USA)	Amantle Montsho (BOT)	Pamela Jelimo (KEN)	Abeba Aregawi (ETH)	Vivian Cheruiyot (KEN)	Dawn Harper (USA)	Kaliese Spencer (JAM)	Milcah Chemos Cheywa (KEN)

- In Doha, 3000 m race is counted to the Diamond League standings for the 5000 metres.

==== Field ====
#	Meeting	Long jump	Triple jump	High jump	Pole vault	Shot put	Discus	Javelin
1	Doha	–	Olga Rypakova (KAZ); 14.33	–	Anastasia Savchenko (RUS); 4.57 PB	Jillian Camarena (USA); 19.81 PB	-	Barbora Špotáková (CZE); 66.17WL
2	Shanghai	Janay DeLoach (USA); 6.73 MR	–	Chaunté Lowe (USA); 1.92	–	–	Sandra Perković (CRO); 68.24 MR, NR	–
3	Rome	–	Olha Saladuha (UKR); 14.75 =SB	–	–	Valerie Adams (NZL); 21.03 WL, MR	–	Barbora Špotáková (CZE); 68.65 WL
4	Eugene	Shara Proctor (GBR); 6.84 PB	–	Anna Chicherova (RUS); 2.02 WL, MR	Fabiana Murer (BRA); 4.63 SB	–	Sandra Perković (CRO); 66.92 MR	–
5	Oslo	Elena Sokolova (RUS); 6.89w	–	Chaunté Lowe (USA); 1.97	–	–	Sandra Perković (CRO); 64.89	–
6	New York	–	Olga Rypakova (KAZ); 14.71 MR	–	Fabiana Murer (BRA); 4.77 WL	Valerie Adams (NZL); 20.60 MR	–	Sunette Viljoen (RSA); 69.35 MR, AR
7	Paris	Elena Sokolova (RUS); 6.70	–	Chaunté Lowe (USA); 1.97	–	–	Dani Samuels (AUS); 61.81	–
8	London	–	Caterine Ibargüen (COL); 14.66	Chaunté Lowe (USA); 2.00	–	–	–	Goldie Sayers (GBR); 66.17 NR
9	Monaco	–	Caterine Ibargüen (COL); 14.85	–	Silke Spiegelburg (GER); 4.82 WL, NR	–	Sandra Perković (CRO); 65.29	–
10	Stockholm	Elena Sokolova (RUS); 6.82	–	Anna Chicherova (RUS); 2.00	Yarisley Silva (CUB); 4.70	Valerie Adams (NZL); 20.26	Sandra Perković (CRO); 68.77	–
11	Lausanne	Elena Sokolova (RUS); 6.89	Olga Rypakova (KAZ); 14.68	–	–	Valerie Adams (NZL); 20.95 MR	–	Barbora Špotáková (CZE); 67.19
12	Birmingham	–	Olha Saladukha (UKR); 14.40	–	Jennifer Suhr (USA); 4.65	Valerie Adams (NZL); 20.52	–	Barbora Špotáková (CZE); 66.08 MR
13	Zürich	Elena Sokolova (RUS); 6.92	–	–	–	Valerie Adams (NZL); 20.81 MR	Sandra Perković (CRO); 63.97	–
14	Brussels	–	Olga Rypakova (KAZ); 14.72	Anna Chicherova (RUS); 1.95	Silke Spiegelburg (GER); 4.75	–	–	Barbora Špotáková (CZE); 66.91
Overall winner		Elena Sokolova (RUS)	Olga Rypakova (KAZ)	Chaunté Lowe (USA)	Silke Spiegelburg (GER)	Valerie Adams (NZL)	Sandra Perković (CRO)	Barbora Špotáková (CZE)

== Results ==
Doha
Event	1st +4 pts	2nd +2 pts	3rd +1 pts	4th ⠀	5th ⠀	6th ⠀	7th ⠀	8th ⠀
Men's 200m (-0.5 m/s)	Walter Dix; USA | 20.02	Churandy Martina; NED | 20.26	Jaysuma Saidy Ndure; NOR | 20.34	Marvin Anderson; JAM | 20.42	Mario Forsythe; JAM | 20.53	Rasheed Dwyer; JAM | 20.60	Aziz Ouhadi; MAR | 20.70	Rakieem Salaam; USA | DNF
Men's 400m	LaShawn Merritt; USA | 44.19	Luguelín Santos; DOM | 44.88	Angelo Taylor; USA | 44.97	Martyn Rooney; GBR | 44.99	Tabarie Henry; ISV | 45.20	Rabah Yousif; SUD | 45.42	Calvin Smith; USA | 45.62	Thomas Schneider; GER | 47.12
Men's 1500m	Silas Kiplagat; KEN | 3:29.63	Asbel Kiprop; KEN | 3:29.78	Bethwell Birgen; KEN | 3:31.17	Nixon Kiplimo Chepseba; KEN | 3:31.32	Collins Cheboi; KEN | 3:32.64	Ilham Tanui Özbilen; TUR | 3:33.32	Mekonnen Gebremedhin; ETH | 3:33.38	Daniel Kipchirchir Komen; KEN | 3:33.43
Men's 3000mSC	Paul Kipsiele Koech; KEN | 7:56.58	Richard Kipkemboi Mateelong; KEN | 7:56.81	Roba Gari; ETH | 8:06.16	Jairus Kipchoge Birech; KEN | 8:06.72	Conseslus Kipruto; KEN | 8:08.92	Bernard Nganga; KEN | 8:11.00	Gilbert Kirui; KEN | 8:11.27	Elijah Chelimo; KEN | 8:12.84
Men's High Jump	Dimitrios Chondrokoukis; GRE | 2.32 m	Jesse Williams; USA | 2.30 m	Mickaël Hanany; FRA | 2.30 m	Samson Oni; GBR | 2.27 m	Donald Thomas; BAH | 2.27 m	Trevor Barry; BAH | 2.27 m	Zhang Guowei; CHN | 2.27 m	Jaroslav Bába; CZE | 2.24 m
Men's Long Jump	Aleksandr Menkov; RUS | 8.22 m	Godfrey Khotso Mokoena; RSA | 8.10 m	Ndiss Kaba Badji; SEN | 8.04 m	Greg Rutherford; GBR | 7.98 m	Tommi Evilä; FIN | 7.92 m	Salim Sdiri; FRA | 7.79 m	Tyrone Smith; BER | 7.69 m	Andrew Howe; ITA | 7.16 m
Men's Discus Throw	Piotr Małachowski; POL | 67.53 m	Ehsan Hadadi; IRI | 66.32 m	Zoltán Kővágó; HUN | DQ (Note: Disqualified after competition due to antidoping rule violation)	Gerd Kanter; EST | 65.57 m	Benn Harradine; AUS | 64.29 m	Vikas Gowda; IND | 64.10 m	Virgilijus Alekna; LTU | 63.99 m	Märt Israel; EST | 62.82 m
Women's 100m (+0.7 m/s)	Allyson Felix; USA | 10.92	Veronica Campbell-Brown; JAM | 10.94	Shelly-Ann Fraser-Pryce; JAM | 11.00	Blessing Okagbare; NGR | 11.01	LaShauntea Moore; USA | 11.13	Mikele Barber; USA | 11.13	Kerron Stewart; JAM | 11.16	Sherone Simpson; JAM | 11.22
Women's 800m	Pamela Jelimo; KEN | 1:56.94	Fantu Magiso; ETH | 1:57.90	Janeth Jepkosgei; KEN | 1:58.50	Yuneysi Santiusti; CUB | 1:59.26	Emma Jackson; GBR | 1:59.37	Molly Ludlow; USA | 1:59.51	Eunice Jepkoech Sum; KEN | 1:59.94	Tintu Luka; IND | 2:01.09
Women's 3000m	Vivian Jepkemei Cheruiyot; KEN | 8:46.44	Meseret Defar; ETH | 8:46.49	Sylvia Jebiwot Kibet; KEN | 8:47.49	Gelete Burka; ETH | 8:48.92	Priscah Jepleting Cherono; KEN | 8:50.04	Viola Jelagat Kibiwot; KEN | 8:50.63	Janet Kisa; KEN | 8:51.63	Pauline Chemning Korikwiang; KEN | 8:52.04
Women's 100mH (+0.1 m/s)	Brigitte Ann Foster-Hylton; JAM | 12.60	Kellie Wells; USA | 12.72	Phylicia George; CAN | 12.79	Nia Ali; USA | 12.93	Perdita Felicien; CAN | 12.95	Priscilla Schliep; CAN | 12.95	Yvette Lewis; USA | 13.08	Nikkita Holder; CAN | 20.81
Women's 400mH	Melaine Walker; JAM | 54.62	Kaliese Carter; JAM | 54.99	Perri Shakes-Drayton; GBR | 55.25	Lauren Boden; AUS | 55.75	Hayat Lambarki; MAR | 56.29	Jasmine Hyder; USA | 56.55	Anna Jesień; POL | 56.89	Stephenie Ann McPherson; JAM | 58.61
Women's Pole Vault	Anastasiya Savchenko; RUS | 4.57 m	Silke Spiegelburg; GER | 4.57 m	Nikoleta Kyriakopoulou; GRE | 4.50 m	Vanessa Boslak; FRA | 4.50 m	Kate Dennison; GBR | 4.50 m	Lacy Janson; USA | 4.40 m	Yuliya Golubchikova; RUS | 4.30 m	Mary Saxer; USA | 4.30 m
Women's Triple Jump	Olga Rypakova; KAZ | 14.33 m	Keila Costa; BRA | 14.31 m	Francoise Mbango Etone; FRA | 14.09 m	Dana Velďáková; SVK | 14.00 m	Tatyana Lebedeva; RUS | 13.84 m	Aleksandra Kotlyarova; UZB | 13.78 m	Marija Šestak; SLO | 13.56 m	Małgorzata Trybańska; POL | 13.55 m
Women's Shot Put	Nadezhda Ostapchuk; BLR | DQ	Jillian Camarena-Williams; USA | 19.81 m	Nadine Kleinert; GER | 19.67 m	Anita Márton; HUN | 18.33 m	Cleopatra Borel; TTO | 18.30 m	Josephine Terlecki; GER | 17.71 m	Jessica Cérival; FRA | 16.49 m	
Women's Javelin Throw	Mariya Abakumova; RUS | DQ	Barbora Špotáková; CZE | 66.17 m	Christina Obergföll; GER | 64.59 m	Xiaowei Du; CHN | 61.43 m	Goldie Sayers; GBR | 61.03 m	Kimberley Mickle; AUS | 60.87 m	Martina Ratej; SLO | 60.80 m	Linda Stahl; GER | 59.22 m

Shanghai
Event	1st +4 pts	2nd +2 pts	3rd +1 pts	4th ⠀	5th ⠀	6th ⠀	7th ⠀	8th ⠀
Men's 100m (-0.4 m/s)	Asafa Powell; JAM | 10.02	Michael Rodgers; USA | 10.08	Nesta Carter; JAM | 10.16	Darvis Patton; USA | 10.22	Mario Forsythe; JAM | 10.26	Bingtian Su; CHN | 10.31	Michael Frater; JAM | 10.32	Kim Collins; SKN | 10.34
Men's 800m	Leonard Kirwa Kosencha; KEN | 1:46.04	Timothy Kitum; KEN | 1:46.20	André Olivier; RSA | 1:46.74	Andreas Bube; DEN | 1:46.78	Jeffrey Riseley; AUS | 1:46.79	Alfred Kirwa Yego; KEN | 1:47.14	Asbel Kiprop; KEN | 1:47.97	Marcin Lewandowski; POL | 1:48.51
Men's 5000m	Hagos Gebrhiwet; ETH | 13:11.00	Thomas Pkemei Longosiwa; KEN | 13:11.73	John Kipkoech; KEN | 13:12.66	Vincent Kiprop Chepkok; KEN | 13:13.23	Kenenisa Bekele; ETH | 13:13.89	Yenew Alamirew; ETH | 13:14.26	Augustine Kiprono Choge; KEN | 13:15.50	Sammy Alex Mutahi; KEN | DQ
Men's 110mH (+0.4 m/s)	Xiang Liu; CHN | 12.97	David Oliver; USA | 13.13	Jason Richardson; USA | 13.16	Aries Merritt; USA | 13.26	Dexter Faulk; USA | 13.43	Kevin Craddock; USA | 13.51	Dongpeng Shi; CHN | 13.60	Wenjun Xie; CHN | 13.64
Men's 400mH	Angelo Taylor; USA | 48.98	Justin Gaymon; USA | 49.07	Wen Cheng; CHN | 49.59	Aleksandr Derevyagin; RUS | 50.33	LJ van Zyl; RSA | 50.38	Li Zhilong; CHN | 50.47	Yuta Imazeki; JPN | 50.48	Isa Phillips; JAM | 50.59
Men's Pole Vault	Yansheng Yang; CHN | 5.65 m	Björn Otto; GER | 5.65 m	Malte Mohr; GER | 5.55 m	Brad Walker; USA | 5.55 m	Konstantinos Filippidis; GRE | 5.45 m	Hendrik Gruber; GER | 5.45 m	Zhang Wei; CHN | 5.30 m	Mark Hollis; USA | 5.30 m
Men's Triple Jump	Phillips Idowu; GBR | 17.24 m	Will Claye; USA | 17.12 m	Christian Taylor; USA | 16.96 m	Henry Frayne; AUS | 16.67 m	Bin Dong; CHN | 16.35 m	Shuo Cao; CHN | 16.34 m	Samyr Laine; HAI | 16.09 m	Yanxi Li; CHN | 15.49 m
Men's Shot Put	Reese Hoffa; USA | 20.98 m	Dylan Armstrong; CAN | 20.93 m	Ryan Whiting; USA | 20.73 m	Christian Cantwell; USA | 20.57 m	Asmir Kolašinac; SRB | 19.80 m	Nedžad Mulabegović; CRO | 19.65 m	Guangfu Wang; CHN | 19.26 m	Like Wang; CHN | 18.52 m
Men's Javelin Throw	Vítězslav Veselý; CZE | 85.40 m	Matthias de Zordo; GER | 81.62 m	Ari Mannio; FIN | 80.91 m	Andreas Thorkildsen; NOR | 79.53 m	Tero Pitkämäki; FIN | 77.99 m	Chen Qi; CHN | 76.45 m	Robert Oosthuizen; RSA | 75.48 m	Xingyu Jiang; CHN | 75.47 m
Women's 200m (+2.8 m/s)	Veronica Campbell-Brown; JAM | 22.50	Carmelita Jeter; USA | 22.62	Blessing Okagbare; NGR | 22.71	Anneisha McLaughlin-Whilby; JAM | 22.79	Charonda Williams; USA | 22.80	Tiffany Townsend; USA | 22.93	Aleen Bailey; JAM | 23.02	Yongli Wei; CHN | 23.53
Women's 400m	Novlene Williams-Mills; JAM | 50.00	Amantle Montsho; BOT | 50.83	Kaliese Carter; JAM | 51.81	Shericka Williams; JAM | 52.21	Debbie Dunn; USA | 52.80	Antonina Yefremova; UKR | DQ	Xiaoyin Tang; CHN | 54.35	Jingwen Chen; CHN | 54.37
Women's 1500m	Genzebe Dibaba; ETH | 3:57.77	Abeba Aregawi; ETH | 3:59.23	Ibtissam Lakhouad; MAR | 4:01.69	Hellen Obiri; KEN | 4:03.15	Faith Kipyegon; KEN | 4:03.82	Kaila McKnight; AUS | 4:05.61	Eunice Jepkoech Sum; KEN | 4:05.90	Janeth Jepkosgei; KEN | 4:07.34
Women's 3000mSC	Milcah Chemos; KEN | 9:15.81	Sofia Assefa; ETH | 9:16.83	Lidya Chepkurui; KEN | 9:22.66	Mercy Wanjiku Njoroge; KEN | 9:26.50	Lydia Chebet Rotich; KEN | 9:35.34	Hyvin Kiyeng; KEN | 9:38.80	Li Zhenzhu; CHN | 9:39.75	Barbara Parker; GBR | 9:40.16
Women's High Jump	Chaunte Lowe; USA | 1.92 m	Xingjuan Zheng; CHN | 1.92 m	Marina Aitova; KAZ | 1.88 m	Inika McPherson; USA | 1.88 m	Svetlana Radzivil; UZB | 1.88 m	Airinė Palšytė; LTU | 1.88 m	Vita Styopina; UKR | 1.84 m	Levern Spencer; LCA | 1.84 m
Women's Long Jump	Janay Deloach; USA | 6.73 m	Blessing Okagbare; NGR | 6.64 m	Funmi Jimoh; USA | 6.53 m	Viktoriya Rybalko; UKR | 6.38 m	Wupin Wang; CHN | 6.38 m	Ivana Vuleta; SRB | 6.37 m	Cornelia Ioana Deiac; ROU | 6.37 m	Shara Proctor; GBR | 6.31 m
Women's Discus Throw	Sandra Perković; CRO | 68.24 m	Stephanie Brown-Trafton; USA | 64.20 m	Dani Stevens; AUS | 62.34 m	Zinaida Sendriutė; LTU | 61.49 m	Xinyue Su; CHN | 60.05 m	Aretha D. Thurmond; USA | 58.41 m	Fei Yang; CHN | 58.06 m	Sabine Rumpf; GER | 56.36 m

Rome
Event	1st +4 pts	2nd +2 pts	3rd +1 pts	4th ⠀	5th ⠀	6th ⠀	7th ⠀	8th ⠀
Men's 100m (-0.1 m/s)	Usain Bolt; JAM | 9.76	Asafa Powell; JAM | 9.91	Christophe Lemaitre; FRA | 10.04	Kim Collins; SKN | 10.05	Lerone Clarke; JAM | 10.16	Kimmari Roach; JAM | 10.23	Jak Ali Harvey; JAM | 10.24	Ainsley Waugh; JAM | 10.30
Men's 400mH	Javier Culson; PUR | 48.14	Bershawn Jackson; USA | 48.25	Cornel Fredericks; RSA | 49.21	Jehue Gordon; TTO | 49.55	Nathan Woodward; GBR | 49.64	Omar Cisneros; CUB | 49.79	Jose Reynaldo Bencosme de Leon; ITA | 50.16	LJ van Zyl; RSA | 50.33
Men's 3000mSC	Paul Kipsiele Koech; KEN | 7:54.31	Abel Kiprop Mutai; KEN | 8:01.67	Jairus Kipchoge Birech; KEN | 8:08.79	Ezekiel Kemboi; KEN | 8:10.55	Mahiedine Mekhissi; FRA | 8:10.96	Hilal Yego; KEN | 8:11.83	Jacob Araptany; UGA | 8:14.48	Benjamin Kiplagat; UGA | 8:17.55
Men's High Jump	Robbie Grabarz; GBR | 2.33 m	Jesse Williams; USA | 2.31 m	Trevor Barry; BAH | 2.31 m	Ivan Ukhov; RUS | 2.31 m	Dimitrios Chondrokoukis; CYP | 2.28 m	Mutaz Essa Barshim; QAT | 2.25 m	Zhang Guowei; CHN | 2.25 m	Aleksey Dmitrik; RUS | 2.20 m
Men's Pole Vault	Renaud Lavillenie; FRA | 5.82 m	Romain Mesnil; FRA | 5.72 m	Malte Mohr; GER | 5.72 m	Björn Otto; GER | 5.60 m	Steven Lewis; GBR | 5.60 m	Steven Hooker; AUS | 5.42 m	Fábio Gomes da Silva; BRA | 5.42 m	Paweł Wojciechowski; POL | 5.42 m
Men's Long Jump	Greg Rutherford; GBR | 8.32 m	Godfrey Khotso Mokoena; RSA | 8.20 m	Aleksandr Menkov; RUS | 8.17 m	Chris Tomlinson; GBR | 7.77 m	Michel Tornéus; SWE | 7.72 m	Tommi Evilä; FIN | 7.65 m	Salim Sdiri; FRA | 7.55 m	Ignisious Gaisah; GHA | 5.99 m
Men's Discus Throw	Ehsan Hadadi; IRI | 66.73 m	Virgilijus Alekna; LTU | 66.31 m	Gerd Kanter; EST | 65.36 m	Zoltán Kővágó; HUN | DQ	Piotr Małachowski; POL | 64.96 m	Jarred Rome; USA | 60.19 m	Giovanni Faloci; ITA | 59.33 m	Hannes Kirchler; ITA | 57.74 m
Women's 100m (0.0 m/s)	Murielle Ahouré-Demps; CIV | 11.00	Shelly-Ann Fraser-Pryce; JAM | 11.06	Kerron Stewart; JAM | 11.10	LaVerne Jones-Ferrette; ISV | 11.18	Ivet Lalova-Collio; BUL | 11.27	Sherone Simpson; JAM | 11.28	Gloria Asumnu; NGR | 11.30	Mikele Barber; USA | 11.39
Women's 800m	Fantu Magiso; ETH | 1:57.56	Pamela Jelimo; KEN | 1:58.33	Mariya Savinova; RUS | DQ	Yuneysi Santiusti; CUB | 1:59.23	Janeth Jepkosgei; KEN | 1:59.42	Malika Akkaoui; MAR | 1:59.80	Yekaterina Kostetskaya; RUS | DQ	Caster Semenya; RSA | 2:00.07
Women's 1500m	Abeba Aregawi; ETH | 3:56.54	Hellen Obiri; KEN | 3:59.68	Genzebe Dibaba; ETH | 4:00.85	Morgan Uceny; USA | 4:01.59	Corinna Harrer; GER | 4:04.30	Ibtissam Lakhouad; MAR | 4:04.30	Renata Pliś; POL | 4:04.48	Hilary Stellingwerff; CAN | 4:05.08
Women's 5000m	Vivian Jepkemei Cheruiyot; KEN | 14:35.62	Meseret Defar; ETH | 14:35.65	Viola Jelagat Kibiwot; KEN | 14:39.53	Gelete Burka; ETH | 14:41.43	Veronica Wanjiru; KEN | 14:44.82	Sylvia Jebiwot Kibet; KEN | 14:46.73	Genet Yalew; ETH | 14:48.43	Azmera Gebru; ETH | 14:58.23
Women's 100mH (-0.1 m/s)	Dawn Harper-Nelson; USA | 12.66	Kellie Wells; USA | 12.67	Brigitte Ann Foster-Hylton; JAM | 12.78	Michelle Perry; USA | 12.78	Priscilla Schliep; CAN | 12.81	Tiffany Porter; GBR | 12.84	Danielle Carruthers; USA | 12.87	Marzia Caravelli; ITA | 12.96
Women's 400mH	Kaliese Carter; JAM | 54.39	Lashinda Demus; USA | 54.80	T'erea Brown; USA | 54.96	Zuzana Hejnová; CZE | 55.09	Ajoke Odumosu; NGR | 55.20	Queen Claye; USA | 55.66	Natalya Antyukh; RUS | 55.83	Melaine Walker; JAM | 56.26
Women's Triple Jump	Olha Saladukha; UKR | 14.75 m	Olga Rypakova; KAZ | 14.73 m	Caterine Ibarguen; COL | 14.71 m	Yamilé Aldama; GBR | 14.65 m	Kimberly Williams; JAM | 14.52 m	Simona la Mantia; ITA | 13.87 m	Marija Šestak; SLO | 13.74 m	Keila Costa; BRA | 13.55 m
Women's Shot Put	Valerie Adams; NZL | 21.03 m	Lijiao Gong; CHN | 19.79 m	Nadezhda Ostapchuk; BLR | DQ	Michelle Carter; USA | 18.66 m	Xiangrong Liu; CHN | 18.63 m	Chiara Rosa; ITA | 18.63 m	Nadine Kleinert; GER | 18.51 m	Josephine Terlecki; GER | 17.79 m
Women's Javelin Throw	Barbora Špotáková; CZE | 68.65 m	Sunette Viljoen; RSA | 67.95 m	Goldie Sayers; GBR | 64.73 m	Christina Obergföll; GER | 62.60 m	Mariya Abakumova; RUS | DQ	Zahra Bani; ITA | 57.01 m	Kara Winger; USA | 55.94 m	Martina Ratej; SLO | NM

Eugene
Event	1st +4 pts	2nd +2 pts	3rd +1 pts	4th ⠀	5th ⠀	6th ⠀	7th ⠀	8th ⠀
Men's 200m (-2.1 m/s)	Wallace Spearmon; USA | 20.27	Churandy Martina; NED | 20.49	Marvin Anderson; JAM | 20.74	Rondel Sorrillo; TTO | 20.81	Jaysuma Saidy Ndure; NOR | 20.81	Emmanuel Callender; TTO | 20.97	Richard Thompson; TTO | 21.30	Shawn Crawford; USA | 21.39
Men's 400m	LaShawn Merritt; USA | 44.91	Christopher Brown; BAH | 45.24	Angelo Taylor; USA | 45.59	Kévin Borlée; BEL | 45.61	Jeremy Wariner; USA | 45.68	Demetrius Pinder; BAH | 45.73	Oscar Pistorius; RSA | 46.86	Kirani James; GRN | DQ
Men's 800m	Abubaker Kaki; SUD | 1:43.71	Mohammed Aman; ETH | 1:43.74	Nick Symmonds; USA | 1:44.32	Khadevis Robinson; USA | 1:44.54	Adam Kszczot; POL | 1:44.71	Anthony Chemut; KEN | 1:44.73	Job Kinyor; KEN | 1:45.09	Tyler Mulder; USA | 1:45.55
Men's Mile	Asbel Kiprop; KEN | 3:49.40	Mekonnen Gebremedhin; ETH | 3:50.17	Ayanleh Souleiman; DJI | 3:50.21	Bethwell Birgen; KEN | 3:50.43	Caleb Mwangangi Ndiku; KEN | 3:50.79	Collins Cheboi; KEN | 3:51.44	Nick Willis; NZL | 3:51.77	Abdelaati Iguider; MAR | 3:51.78
Men's 5000m	Mo Farah; GBR | 12:56.98	Isiah Kiplangat Koech; KEN | 12:57.63	Galen Rupp; USA | 12:58.90	Kenenisa Bekele; ETH | 13:01.48	Thomas Pkemei Longosiwa; KEN | 13:03.88	John Kipkoech; KEN | 13:06.71	Yenew Alamirew; ETH | 13:06.84	Samuel Chelanga; KEN | 13:09.67
Men's 110mH (+2.4 m/s)	Xiang Liu; CHN | 12.87	Aries Merritt; USA | 12.96	Jason Richardson; USA | 13.11	Dexter Faulk; USA | 13.12	David Oliver; USA | 13.13	Ryan Wilson; USA | 13.29	Ashton Eaton; USA | 13.34	Andrew Turner; GBR | 13.46
Men's Triple Jump	Christian Taylor; USA | 17.62 m	Will Claye; USA | 17.48 m	Phillips Idowu; GBR | 17.05 m	Leevan Sands; BAH | 16.99 m	Henry Frayne; AUS | 16.64 m	Walter Davis; USA | 16.49 m	Yanxi Li; CHN | 15.58 m	
Men's Shot Put	Reese Hoffa; USA | 21.81 m	Tomasz Majewski; POL | 21.60 m	Dylan Armstrong; CAN | 21.50 m	Ryan Whiting; USA | 21.13 m	Christian Cantwell; USA | 20.98 m	Dan Taylor; USA | 20.16 m	Justin Rodhe; CAN | 20.13 m	
Men's Javelin Throw	Vadims Vasiļevskis; LAT | 84.65 m	Vítězslav Veselý; CZE | 83.78 m	Stuart Farquhar; NZL | 82.23 m	Cyrus Hostetler; USA | 81.02 m	Sergey Makarov; RUS | 79.85 m	Petr Frydrych; CZE | 71.42 m	Zigismunds Sirmais; LAT | 70.24 m	
Women's 200m (+0.8 m/s)	Allyson Felix; USA | 22.23	Jeneba Tarmoh; USA | 22.61	Blessing Okagbare; NGR | 22.63	Bianca Knight; USA | 22.64	Carmelita Jeter; USA | 22.78	Anneisha McLaughlin-Whilby; JAM | 23.00	LaShauntea Moore; USA | 23.03	Candyce McGrone; USA | 23.74
Women's 400m	Sanya Richards-Ross; USA | 49.39	Amantle Montsho; BOT | 49.62	Novlene Williams-Mills; JAM | 49.78	Francena McCorory; USA | 50.41	DeeDee Trotter; USA | 50.80	Shericka Williams; JAM | 51.24	Debbie Dunn; USA | 51.26	Natasha Hastings; USA | 51.78
Women's 3000mSC	Milcah Chemos; KEN | 9:13.69	Sofia Assefa; ETH | 9:15.45	Hiwot Ayalew; ETH | 9:15.84	Barbara Parker; GBR | 9:24.24	Emma Coburn; USA | 9:25.28	Lydia Chebet Rotich; KEN | 9:31.09	Gesa Felicitas Krause; GER | 9:34.76	Lyudmila Remeslova; RUS | 9:35.41
Women's High Jump	Anna Chicherova; RUS | 2.02 m	Svetlana Shkolina; RUS | 2.00 m	Chaunte Lowe; USA | 1.97 m	Brigetta Barrett; USA | 1.91 m	Emma Green; SWE | 1.91 m	Xingjuan Zheng; CHN | 1.91 m	Ebba Jungmark; SWE | 1.91 m	Mélanie Melfort; FRA | 1.86 m
Women's Pole Vault	Fabiana Murer; BRA | 4.63 m	Svetlana Feofanova; RUS | 4.58 m	Martina Strutz; GER | 4.38 m	Lacy Janson; USA | 4.38 m	Kylie Hutson; USA | 4.38 m	Angelica Bengtsson; SWE | 4.38 m	Holly Bradshaw; GBR | 4.28 m	Yarisley Silva; CUB | DNS m
Women's Long Jump	Shara Proctor; GBR | 6.84 m	Éloyse Lesueur-Aymonin; FRA | 6.83 m	Janay Deloach; USA | 6.71 m	Bianca Stuart; BAH | 6.66 m	Ineta Radēviča; LAT | 6.64 m	Maurren Higa Maggi; BRA | 6.51 m	Brittney Reese; USA | 6.48 m	Funmi Jimoh; USA | 6.25 m
Women's Discus Throw	Sandra Perković; CRO | 66.92 m	Darya Pishchalnikova; RUS | DQ	Żaneta Glanc; POL | 62.84 m	Krishna Poonia; IND | 62.11 m	Gia Lewis-Smallwood; USA | 61.77 m	Aretha D. Thurmond; USA | 56.50 m	Stephanie Brown-Trafton; USA | NM	Kateryna Karsak; UKR | DNS m

Oslo
Event	1st +4 pts	2nd +2 pts	3rd +1 pts	4th ⠀	5th ⠀	6th ⠀	7th ⠀	8th ⠀
Men's 100m (+0.6 m/s)	Usain Bolt; JAM | 9.79	Asafa Powell; JAM | 9.85	Lerone Clarke; JAM | 10.10	Justyn Warner; CAN | 10.20	Simon Magakwe; RSA | 10.30	Marlon Devonish; GBR | 10.40	Fabio Cerutti; ITA | 10.52	Mark Lewis-Francis; GBR | DQ
Men's Mile	Asbel Kiprop; KEN | 3:49.22	Caleb Mwangangi Ndiku; KEN | 3:50.00	Mekonnen Gebremedhin; ETH | 3:50.02	Gideon Gathimba; KEN | 3:50.24	Amine Laalou; MAR | 3:50.43	James Kiplagat Magut; KEN | 3:50.68	Bethwell Birgen; KEN | 3:50.73	Hamza Driouch; QAT | 3:50.90
Men's 5000m	Dejen Gebremeskel; ETH | 12:58.92	Hagos Gebrhiwet; ETH | 12:58.99	Imane Merga; ETH | 12:59.77	Tariku Bekele; ETH | 13:00.41	Kenenisa Bekele; ETH | 13:00.54	Moses Ndiema Kipsiro; UGA | 13:00.68	Sileshi Sihine; ETH | 13:01.39	Yigrem Demelash; ETH | 13:03.30
Men's 400mH	Javier Culson; PUR | 47.92	Jehue Gordon; TTO | 48.78	Justin Gaymon; USA | 48.97	David Greene; GBR | 48.98	Cornel Fredericks; RSA | 49.16	Jack Green; GBR | 49.70	Richard Yates; GBR | 50.46	Georg Fleischhauer; GER | 50.55
Men's Pole Vault	Renaud Lavillenie; FRA | 5.82 m	Malte Mohr; GER | 5.62 m	Łukasz Michalski; POL | 5.52 m	Lázaro Borges; CUB | 5.52 m	Alhaji Jeng; SWE | 5.42 m	Björn Otto; GER | 5.42 m	Jérôme Clavier; FRA | 5.42 m	Paweł Wojciechowski; POL | NH m
Men's Triple Jump	Lyukman Adams; RUS | 17.09 m	Christian Taylor; USA | 17.06 m	Seref Osmanoglu; UKR | 17.03 m	Benjamin Compaoré; FRA | 16.90 m	Peder Pawel Nielsen; DEN | 16.88 m	Alexis Copello; CUB | 16.70 m	Osviel Hernández; CUB | 16.35 m	Onochie Achike; GBR | 16.12 m
Men's Shot Put	Tomasz Majewski; POL | 21.36 m	Dylan Armstrong; CAN | 20.82 m	David Storl; GER | 20.69 m	Kim Juhl Christensen; DEN | 19.69 m	Marco Fortes; POR | 19.56 m	Óðinn Björn Þorsteinsson; ISL | 18.66 m	Leif Arrhenius; SWE | 18.61 m	Stian Andersen; NOR | 16.47 m
Men's Javelin Throw	Vítězslav Veselý; CZE | 88.11 m	Fatih Avan; TUR | 83.82 m	Andreas Thorkildsen; NOR | 82.30 m	Ari Mannio; FIN | 82.20 m	Matthias de Zordo; GER | 81.44 m	Vadims Vasiļevskis; LAT | 80.96 m	Stuart Farquhar; NZL | 78.84 m	Ivan Zaytsev; UZB | 77.81 m
Women's 200m (+1.5 m/s)	Murielle Ahouré-Demps; CIV | 22.42	Abiodun Oyepitan; GBR | 22.71	Charonda Williams; USA | 22.75	Mariya Ryemyen; UKR | 22.78	Sheri-Ann Brooks; JAM | 23.16	Kerron Stewart; JAM | 23.19	Sherone Simpson; JAM | 23.32	Folake Akinyemi; NOR | 23.83
Women's 400m	Amantle Montsho; BOT | 49.68	Patricia Hall; JAM | 50.71	Debbie Dunn; USA | 51.22	Natalya Antyukh; RUS | 51.51	Shericka Williams; JAM | 51.56	Moa Hjelmer; SWE | 51.99	Marie Gayot; FRA | 52.47	Nicola Sanders; GBR | 52.79
Women's 1500m	Abeba Aregawi; ETH | 4:02.42	Genzebe Dibaba; ETH | 4:03.28	Anna Mishchenko; UKR | 4:03.33	Hellen Obiri; KEN | 4:04.42	Ibtissam Lakhouad; MAR | 4:04.45	Morgan Uceny; USA | 4:05.30	Ingvill Måkestad Bovim; NOR | 4:06.31	Anna Willard; USA | 4:06.91
Women's 100mH (+0.7 m/s)	Sally Pearson; AUS | 12.49	Kristi Castlin; USA | 12.56	Tiffany Porter; GBR | 12.70	Priscilla Schliep; CAN | 12.74	Lolo Jones; USA | 12.75	Danielle Carruthers; USA | 12.76	Lisa Urech; SUI | 13.15	Jessica Ennis-Hill; GBR | DQ
Women's 3000mSC	Milcah Chemos; KEN | 9:07.14	Sofia Assefa; ETH | 9:09.00	Hiwot Ayalew; ETH | 9:09.61	Mercy Wanjiku Njoroge; KEN | 9:25.21	Lidya Chepkurui; KEN | 9:27.40	Gesa Felicitas Krause; GER | 9:33.10	Lydia Chebet Rotich; KEN | 9:33.19	Birtukan Adamu; ETH | 9:36.40
Women's High Jump	Chaunte Lowe; USA | 1.97 m	Tia Hellebaut; BEL | 1.93 m	Marina Aitova; KAZ | 1.90 m	Anna Iljuštšenko; EST | 1.90 m	Ruth Beitia; ESP | 1.90 m	Øyunn Grindem Mogstad; NOR | 1.85 m	Tonje Angelsen; NOR | 1.85 m	Stine Kufaas; NOR | 1.80 m
Women's Long Jump	Olga Kucherenko; RUS | DQ	Yelena Sokolova; RUS | 6.89 m	Janay Deloach; USA | 6.78 m	Shara Proctor; GBR | 6.60 m	Ivana Vuleta; SRB | 6.48 m	Ineta Radēviča; LAT | 6.46 m	Olga Zaytseva; RUS | 6.07 m	Yelena Sokolova; RUS | 6.86 m
Women's Discus Throw	Sandra Perković; CRO | 64.89 m	Nadine Müller; GER | 63.60 m	Yarelis Barrios; CUB | 63.57 m	Żaneta Glanc; POL | 63.00 m	Natalia Stratulat; MDA | 58.35 m	Nicoleta Grasu; ROU | 56.71 m	Monique Jansen; NED | 56.61 m	Grete Etholm; NOR | 53.23 m

New
Event	1st ⠀	2nd ⠀	3rd ⠀	4th ⠀	5th ⠀	6th ⠀	7th ⠀	8th ⠀
Men's 200m (+0.1 m/s)	Churandy Martina; NED | 19.94	Nickel Ashmeade; JAM | 19.94	Warren Weir; JAM | 20.08	Marvin Anderson; JAM | 20.21	Jaysuma Saidy Ndure; NOR | 20.35	Rasheed Dwyer; JAM | 20.66	Curtis Mitchell; USA | DQ	Mario Forsythe; JAM | DNS
Men's 800m	David Rudisha; KEN | 1:41.74	Alfred Kirwa Yego; KEN | 1:44.49	Andrew Osagie; GBR | 1:44.61	Boaz Kiplagat Lalang; KEN | 1:44.83	Robby Andrews; USA | 1:45.06	Michael Rutt; USA | 1:45.20	Diomar de Souza; BRA | 1:47.13	Matthew Scherer; USA | DNF
Men's 110mH (+0.9 m/s)	Jason Richardson; USA | 13.18	Jeff Porter; USA | 13.26	Orlando Ortega; CUB | 13.35	David Oliver; USA | 13.37	Ryan Brathwaite; BAR | 13.48	Omoghan Osaghae; USA | 13.49	Dwight Thomas; JAM | 25.08	Hansle Parchment; JAM | DNF
Men's High Jump	Jesse Williams; USA | 2.36 m	Robbie Grabarz; GBR | 2.36 m	Jamie Nieto; USA | 2.31 m	Trevor Barry; BAH | 2.31 m	Dimitrios Chondrokoukis; CYP | 2.28 m	Samson Oni; GBR | 2.25 m	Donald Thomas; BAH | 2.20 m	Andra Manson; USA | 2.15 m
Men's Long Jump	Mitchell Watt; AUS | 8.16 m	Fabrice Lapierre; AUS | 8.14 m	George Kitchens; USA | 7.88 m	Tyrone Smith; BER | 7.73 m	Chaz Thomas; USA | 7.58 m	Walter Davis; USA | 7.18 m	Nafee Harris; USA | 5.84 m	Fabrice Lapierre; AUS | 8.10 m
Men's Discus Throw	Zoltán Kővágó; HUN | DQ	Frank Casanas; ESP | 65.21 m	Vikas Gowda; IND | 64.86 m	Rutger Smith; NED | 64.35 m	Lawrence Okoye; GBR | 63.87 m	Jorge Fernández; CUB | 63.24 m	Benn Harradine; AUS | 62.15 m	Casey Malone; USA | 60.61 m
Women's 100m (-0.1 m/s)	Shelly-Ann Fraser-Pryce; JAM | 10.92	Tianna Madison; USA | 10.97	Carmelita Jeter; USA | 11.05	Allyson Felix; USA | 11.07	Kelly-Ann Baptiste; TTO | 11.07	Blessing Okagbare; NGR | 11.10	Schillonie Calvert-Powell; JAM | 11.25	Bianca Knight; USA | 11.29
Women's 800m	Fantu Magiso; ETH | 1:57.48	Molly Ludlow; USA | 1:59.18	Marilyn Okoro; GBR | 1:59.37	Maggie Vessey; USA | 2:00.48	Erica Moore; USA | 2:00.72	Jemma Simpson; GBR | 2:00.97	Ajee Wilson; USA | 2:02.61	Amy Weissenbach; USA | 2:04.03
Women's 5000m	Tirunesh Dibaba; ETH | 14:50.80	Meseret Defar; ETH | 14:57.02	Gelete Burka; ETH | 15:02.74	Werknesh Kidane; ETH | 15:04.65	Genet Yalew; ETH | 15:22.03	Fionnuala McCormack; IRL | 15:33.04	Emebet Anteneh; ETH | 15:43.66	Gotytom Gebreslase; ETH | 15:46.89
Women's 400mH	T'erea Brown; USA | 54.85	Kaliese Carter; JAM | 54.91	Queen Claye; USA | 55.32	Nicole Leach; USA | 55.37	Nickiesha Wilson; JAM | 56.29	Ristananna Tracey; JAM | 56.43	Raasin McIntosh; USA | 56.76	Jasmine Hyder; USA | 57.75
Women's Pole Vault	Fabiana Murer; BRA | 4.77 m	Yarisley Silva; CUB | 4.70 m	Nikoleta Kyriakopoulou; GRE | 4.60 m	Monika Pyrek; POL | 4.50 m	Nicole Büchler; SUI | 4.37 m	Lacy Janson; USA | 4.37 m	Mary Saxer; USA | 4.37 m	Kylie Hutson; USA | 4.22 m
Women's Triple Jump	Olga Rypakova; KAZ | 14.71 m	Kimberly Williams; JAM | 14.45 m	Dailenys Alcántara; CUB | 14.24 m	Keila Costa; BRA | 14.12 m	Yargelis Savigne; CUB | 14.08 m	Josleidy Ribalta; CUB | 13.80 m	Erica McLain; USA | 13.21 m	Blessing Ufodiama; USA | 12.98 m
Women's Shot Put	Valerie Adams; NZL | 20.60 m	Jillian Camarena-Williams; USA | 19.62 m	Michelle Carter; USA | 19.32 m	Cleopatra Borel; TTO | 18.19 m	Sarah Stevens-Walker; USA | 17.89 m	Julie Labonté; CAN | 17.59 m	Zara Northover; JAM | 16.01 m	
Women's Javelin Throw	Sunette Viljoen; RSA | 69.35 m	Barbora Špotáková; CZE | 68.73 m	Kara Winger; USA | 60.33 m	Goldie Sayers; GBR | 59.23 m	Ásdís Hjálmsdóttir; ISL | 58.72 m	Jarmila Jurkovičová; CZE | 56.38 m	Rachel Buciarski; USA | 53.05 m	Kateema Riettie; JAM | 52.03 m

Paris
Event	1st +4 pts	2nd +2 pts	3rd +1 pts	4th ⠀	5th ⠀	6th ⠀	7th ⠀	8th ⠀
Men's 100m (0.0 m/s)	Tyson Gay; USA | 9.99	Justin Gatlin; USA | 10.03	Christophe Lemaitre; FRA | 10.08	Nickel Ashmeade; JAM | 10.14	Michael Frater; JAM | 10.14	Michael Rodgers; USA | 10.16	Trell Kimmons; USA | 10.18	Richard Thompson; TTO | 10.20
Men's 800m	David Rudisha; KEN | 1:41.54	Antonio Manuel Reina; ESP | 1:45.62	Alfred Kirwa Yego; KEN | 1:45.68	Lachlan Renshaw; AUS | 1:45.90	Paul Renaudie; FRA | 1:46.16	Richard Kiplagat; KEN | 1:46.26	Hamid Oualich; FRA | 1:46.26	Elijah Greer; USA | 1:46.59
Men's 5000m	Dejen Gebremeskel; ETH | 12:46.81	Hagos Gebrhiwet; ETH | 12:47.53	Isiah Kiplangat Koech; KEN | 12:48.64	Yenew Alamirew; ETH | 12:48.77	Thomas Pkemei Longosiwa; KEN | 12:49.04	John Kipkoech; KEN | 12:49.50	Tariku Bekele; ETH | 12:54.13	Eliud Kipchoge; KEN | 12:55.34
Men's 400mH	Javier Culson; PUR | 47.78	David Greene; GBR | 47.84	Félix Sánchez; DOM | 48.56	Bershawn Jackson; USA | 48.67	Jehue Gordon; TTO | 49.03	Omar Cisneros; CUB | 49.09	Adrien Clemenceau; FRA | 49.81	Héni Kechi; FRA | 50.15
Men's 3000mSC	Paul Kipsiele Koech; KEN | 8:00.57	Brimin Kiprop Kipruto; KEN | 8:01.73	Abel Kiprop Mutai; KEN | 8:03.15	Jairus Kipchoge Birech; KEN | 8:03.43	Brahim Taleb; MAR | 8:11.72	Roba Gari; ETH | 8:13.65	Hilal Yego; KEN | 8:15.33	Jonathan Muia Ndiku; KEN | 8:17.88
Men's Pole Vault	Renaud Lavillenie; FRA | 5.77 m	Konstantinos Filippidis; GRE | 5.62 m	Björn Otto; GER | 5.62 m	Malte Mohr; GER | 5.52 m	Steven Lewis; GBR | 5.52 m	Maksym Mazuryk; UKR | 5.52 m	Jérôme Clavier; FRA | 5.52 m	Emile Denecker; FRA | 5.52 m
Men's Triple Jump	Leevan Sands; BAH | 17.23 m	Karl Taillepierre; FRA | 16.84 m	Harold Correa; FRA | 16.76 m	Jadel Gregório; BRA | 16.39 m	Alieksei Tsapik; BLR | 16.30 m	Julien Kapek; FRA | 16.04 m	Alexis Copello; CUB | 15.91 m	Karol Hoffmann; POL | 15.89 m
Men's Shot Put	Dylan Armstrong; CAN | 20.54 m	Joe Kovacs; USA | 20.44 m	Kim Juhl Christensen; DEN | 20.02 m	Marco Fortes; POR | 19.85 m	Nedžad Mulabegović; CRO | 19.81 m	Dmytro Savytskyy; UKR | 19.72 m	Ladislav Prášil; CZE | 19.08 m	Tumatai Dauphin; FRA | 18.97 m
Men's Javelin Throw	Oleksandr Pyatnytsya; UKR | 85.67 m	Vítězslav Veselý; CZE | 83.93 m	Jarrod Bannister; AUS | 83.70 m	Roman Avramenko; UKR | 80.92 m	Vadims Vasiļevskis; LAT | 80.31 m	Fatih Avan; TUR | 78.30 m	Ari Mannio; FIN | 77.52 m	Jérôme Haeffler; FRA | 68.47 m
Women's 200m (0.0 m/s)	Murielle Ahouré-Demps; CIV | 22.55	Bianca Knight; USA | 22.64	Charonda Williams; USA | 22.70	Hrystyna Stuy; UKR | 22.91	Myriam Soumaré; FRA | 22.95	Natasha Hastings; USA | 23.01	Aleen Bailey; JAM | 23.26	Johanna Danois; FRA | 23.27
Women's 400m	Amantle Montsho; BOT | 49.77	Novlene Williams-Mills; JAM | 49.95	Francena McCorory; USA | 50.27	Christine Ohuruogu; GBR | 50.59	DeeDee Trotter; USA | 50.93	Rose-Marie Whyte-Robinson; JAM | 51.07	Marie Gayot; FRA | 52.04	Muriel Hurtis; FRA | 52.36
Women's 1500m	Mariem Alaoui Selsouli; MAR | DQ	Asli Cakir Alptekin; TUR | DQ	Abeba Aregawi; ETH | 3:58.59	Viola Jelagat Kibiwot; KEN | 3:59.25	Ibtissam Lakhouad; MAR | 3:59.65	Anna Mishchenko; UKR | DQ	Hellen Obiri; KEN | 4:01.43	Lisa Dobriskey; GBR | 4:02.13
Women's 100mH (0.0 m/s)	Sally Pearson; AUS | 12.40	Ginnie Crawford; USA | 12.59	Tiffany Porter; GBR | 12.74	Kristi Castlin; USA | 12.76	Danielle Carruthers; USA | 12.80	Perdita Felicien; CAN | 12.93	Alice Decaux; FRA | 12.96	Aisseta Diawara; FRA | 12.98
Women's 3000mSC	Habiba Ghribi; TUN | 9:28.81	Lidya Chepkurui; KEN | 9:29.02	Sofia Assefa; ETH | 9:29.57	Zemzem Ahmed; ETH | 9:29.89	Gülcan Mingir; TUR | 9:30.02	Hiwot Ayalew; ETH | 9:30.24	Etenesh Diro; ETH | 9:36.41	Barbara Parker; GBR | 9:37.41
Women's High Jump	Chaunte Lowe; USA | 1.97 m	Olena Holosha; UKR | 1.95 m	Ruth Beitia; ESP | 1.92 m	Emma Green; SWE | 1.92 m	Marie-Laurence Jungfleisch; GER | 1.92 m	Nadiya Dusanova; UZB | 1.92 m	Marina Aitova; KAZ | 1.89 m	Anna Iljuštšenko; EST | 1.85 m
Women's Long Jump	Yelena Sokolova; RUS | 6.70 m	Shara Proctor; GBR | 6.65 m	Éloyse Lesueur-Aymonin; FRA | 6.56 m	Janay Deloach; USA | 6.50 m	Funmi Jimoh; USA | 6.35 m	Viktoriya Rybalko; UKR | 6.32 m	Olga Sudarava; BLR | 6.32 m	Whitney Gipson; USA | 6.28 m
Women's Discus Throw	Dani Stevens; AUS | 61.81 m	Sandra Perković; CRO | 61.46 m	Melina Robert-Michon; FRA | 61.04 m	Nataliya Semenova; UKR | 59.93 m	Zinaida Sendriutė; LTU | 59.56 m	Yarelis Barrios; CUB | 58.49 m	Aretha D. Thurmond; USA | 57.72 m	Nicoleta Grasu; ROU | 55.59 m

London
Event	1st +4 pts	2nd +2 pts	3rd +1 pts	4th ⠀	5th ⠀	6th ⠀	7th ⠀	8th ⠀
Men's 100m (-1.2 m/s)	Tyson Gay; USA | 10.03	Ryan Bailey; USA | 10.09	Nesta Carter; JAM | 10.13	Michael Frater; JAM | 10.15	Michael Rodgers; USA | 10.19	Trell Kimmons; USA | 10.19	Kemar Hyman; CAY | 10.25	Kim Collins; SKN | DNS
Men's 800m	Adam Kszczot; POL | 1:44.49	Job Kinyor; KEN | 1:44.60	Andrew Osagie; GBR | 1:45.21	Abubaker Kaki; SUD | 1:46.05	Boaz Kiplagat Lalang; KEN | 1:46.09	Michael Rutt; USA | 1:46.12	Elijah Greer; USA | 1:46.14	Gareth Warburton; GBR | 1:46.56
Men's 5000m	Mo Farah; GBR | 13:06.04	Collis Birmingham; AUS | 13:09.57	Moses Ndiema Kipsiro; UGA | 13:09.98	Mark Kosgei Kiptoo; KEN | 13:13.77	Dathan Ritzenhein; USA | 13:15.91	Emmanuel Kipkemei Bett; KEN | 13:23.05	Craig Mottram; AUS | 13:23.85	Juan Luis Barrios; MEX | 13:35.44
Men's 400mH	Javier Culson; PUR | 47.78	David Greene; GBR | 48.10	Angelo Taylor; USA | 48.43	Jack Green; GBR | 48.60	Félix Sánchez; DOM | 49.68	Michael Tinsley; USA | 49.86	Justin Gaymon; USA | 50.28	Bershawn Jackson; USA | DQ
Men's Pole Vault	Björn Otto; GER | 5.74 m	Romain Mesnil; FRA | 5.66 m	Raphael Holzdeppe; GER | 5.66 m	Konstantinos Filippidis; GRE | 5.56 m	Karsten Dilla; GER | 5.40 m	Renaud Lavillenie; FRA | 5.40 m	Andrew Sutcliffe; GBR | 5.40 m	Steven Lewis; GBR | 5.40 m
Men's Triple Jump	Christian Taylor; USA | 17.41 m	Leevan Sands; BAH | 16.97 m	Tosin Oke; NGR | 16.93 m	Samyr Laine; HAI | 16.85 m	Daniele Greco; ITA | 16.80 m	Karl Taillepierre; FRA | 16.49 m	Aarik Wilson; USA | 16.37 m	Fabrizio Schembri; ITA | 15.87 m
Men's Shot Put	Reese Hoffa; USA | 21.34 m	Tomasz Majewski; POL | 21.28 m	Dylan Armstrong; CAN | 20.46 m	Rutger Smith; NED | 20.42 m	Carl Myerscough; GBR | 19.69 m	Joe Kovacs; USA | 19.61 m	Marco Fortes; POR | 19.21 m	Kim Juhl Christensen; DEN | 19.15 m
Men's Discus Throw	Gerd Kanter; EST | 64.85 m	Virgilijus Alekna; LTU | 63.71 m	Lawrence Okoye; GBR | 63.33 m	Erik Cadée; NED | 63.31 m	Frank Casanas; ESP | 63.23 m	Rutger Smith; NED | 61.93 m	Abdul Buhari; GBR | 60.25 m	Brett Morse; GBR | 59.87 m
Women's 200m (-0.5 m/s)	Charonda Williams; USA | 22.75	Anneisha McLaughlin-Whilby; JAM | 22.81	Bianca Knight; USA | 23.00	Aleen Bailey; JAM | 23.18	Myriam Soumaré; FRA | 23.19	Sherone Simpson; JAM | 23.20	Margaret Adeoye; GBR | 23.36	Debbie Ferguson-McKenzie; BAH | 23.89
Women's 400m	Christine Ohuruogu; GBR | 50.42	Amantle Montsho; BOT | 50.56	Rose-Marie Whyte-Robinson; JAM | 51.19	Natasha Hastings; USA | 51.43	Shericka Williams; JAM | 51.89	Jessica Beard; USA | 52.08	Shana Cox; GBR | 52.38	
Women's 1500m	Maryam Yusuf Jamal; BRN | 4:06.78	Jenny Simpson; USA | 4:07.76	Anna Willard; USA | 4:08.06	Laura Weightman; GBR | 4:08.19	Morgan Uceny; USA | 4:08.22	Shannon Rowbury; USA | 4:08.63	Lisa Dobriskey; GBR | 4:08.83	Kaila McKnight; AUS | 4:10.49
Women's 100mH (+0.6 m/s)	Kellie Wells; USA | 12.57	Sally Pearson; AUS | 12.59	Ginnie Crawford; USA | 12.74	Kristi Castlin; USA | 12.82	Christina Clemons; USA | 12.88	Danielle Carruthers; USA | 12.90	Phylicia George; CAN | 12.94	Brigitte Ann Foster-Hylton; JAM | DNS
Women's 3000mSC	Ancuţa Bobocel; ROU | 9:27.24	Poļina Jeļizarova; LAT | 9:28.27	Barbara Parker; GBR | 9:29.22	Bridget Franek; USA | 9:29.53	Katarzyna Kowalska; POL | 9:34.14	Ashley Higginson; USA | 9:34.49	Phanencer Chemion; KEN | 9:36.55	Beverly Ramos; PUR | 9:41.15
Women's High Jump	Chaunte Lowe; USA | 2.00 m	Tia Hellebaut; BEL | 1.97 m	Ruth Beitia; ESP | 1.94 m	Anna Chicherova; RUS | 1.94 m	Emma Green; SWE | 1.91 m	Airinė Palšytė; LTU | 1.91 m	Marie-Laurence Jungfleisch; GER | 1.87 m	Tonje Angelsen; NOR | 1.87 m
Women's Javelin Throw	Goldie Sayers; GBR | 66.17 m	Barbora Špotáková; CZE | 64.19 m	Vera Markaryan; UKR | 63.80 m	Sunette Viljoen; RSA | 63.33 m	Kimberley Mickle; AUS | 62.36 m	Kathryn Mitchell; AUS | 60.24 m	Katharina Molitor; GER | 58.81 m	Linda Stahl; GER | DNS m

Monaco
Event	1st +4 pts	2nd +2 pts	3rd +1 pts	4th ⠀	5th ⠀	6th ⠀	7th ⠀	8th ⠀
Men's 200m (0.0 m/s)	Nickel Ashmeade; JAM | 20.02	Churandy Martina; NED | 20.07	Wallace Spearmon; USA | 20.09	Calesio Newman; USA | 20.32	Marvin Anderson; JAM | 20.36	Maurice Mitchell; USA | 20.52	Tremaine Harris; CAN | 20.98	Ben Bassaw; FRA | 21.03
Men's 400m	Jonathan Borlée; BEL | 44.74	Kirani James; GRN | 44.76	Kévin Borlée; BEL | 44.94	Luguelín Santos; DOM | 45.10	Jeremy Wariner; USA | 45.28	Martyn Rooney; GBR | 45.52	Pavel Maslák; CZE | 45.55	LaShawn Merritt; USA | DNF
Men's 1500m	Asbel Kiprop; KEN | 3:28.88	Nixon Kiplimo Chepseba; KEN | 3:29.77	Nick Willis; NZL | 3:30.35	Amine Laalou; MAR | DQ	Taoufik Makhloufi; ALG | 3:30.80	Bethwell Birgen; KEN | 3:31.00	Benson Seurei; KEN | 3:31.61	Collins Cheboi; KEN | 3:32.08
Men's 110mH (0.0 m/s)	Aries Merritt; USA | 12.93	Jason Richardson; USA | 13.07	Sergey Shubenkov; RUS | 13.09	David Oliver; USA | 13.14	Jeff Porter; USA | 13.19	Garfield Darien; FRA | 13.27	Andrew Riley; JAM | 13.28	Dimitri Bascou; FRA | 13.54
Men's 3000mSC	Conseslus Kipruto; KEN | 8:03.49	Paul Kipsiele Koech; KEN | 8:03.90	Evan Jager; USA | 8:06.81	Bernard Nganga; KEN | 8:09.23	Jairus Kipchoge Birech; KEN | 8:10.62	Brahim Taleb; MAR | 8:14.11	Richard Kipkemboi Mateelong; KEN | 8:16.26	Jukka Keskisalo; FIN | 8:27.96
Men's High Jump	Jesse Williams; USA | 2.33 m	Robbie Grabarz; GBR | 2.33 m	Derek Drouin; CAN | 2.30 m	Erik Kynard; USA | 2.30 m	Aleksey Dmitrik; RUS | 2.30 m	Trevor Barry; BAH | 2.26 m	Mutaz Essa Barshim; QAT | 2.26 m	Rožle Prezelj; SLO | 2.22 m
Men's Long Jump	Irving Saladino; PAN | 8.16 m	Mitchell Watt; AUS | 8.12 m	Chris Tomlinson; GBR | 8.01 m	Mauro Vinicius da Silva; BRA | 7.99 m	Sebastian Bayer; GER | 7.94 m	Marquise Goodwin; USA | 7.94 m	Luis Felipe Méliz; ESP | 7.78 m	Godfrey Khotso Mokoena; RSA | 7.75 m
Men's Javelin Throw	Oleksandr Pyatnytsya; UKR | 82.85 m	Vadims Vasiļevskis; LAT | 81.90 m	Roman Avramenko; UKR | 81.57 m	Jarrod Bannister; AUS | 81.19 m	Lassi Etelätalo; FIN | 76.70 m	Stuart Farquhar; NZL | 75.84 m	Cyrus Hostetler; USA | 74.79 m	
Women's 100m (0.0 m/s)	Blessing Okagbare; NGR | 10.96	Tianna Madison; USA | 10.99	Jeneba Tarmoh; USA | 11.09	Kerron Stewart; JAM | 11.11	Ivet Lalova-Collio; BUL | 11.15	Sheri-Ann Brooks; JAM | 11.24	Lauryn Williams; USA | 11.24	Myriam Soumaré; FRA | 11.37
Women's 800m	Yelena Kotulskaya; RUS | 1:58.41	Francine Niyonsaba; BDI | 1:58.68	Alysia Montaño; USA | 1:59.05	Molly Ludlow; USA | 1:59.37	Marilyn Okoro; GBR | 1:59.75	Yuneysi Santiusti; CUB | 2:00.18	Irina Maracheva; RUS | DQ	Maryam Yusuf Jamal; BRN | 2:00.76
Women's 3000m	Mercy Cherono; KEN | 8:38.51	Sylvia Jebiwot Kibet; KEN | 8:39.14	Buze Diriba; ETH | 8:39.65	Shannon Rowbury; USA | 8:39.83	Azmera Gebru; ETH | 8:40.01	Veronica Wanjiru; KEN | 8:40.81	Emebet Anteneh; ETH | 8:43.20	Gabriele Grunewald; USA | 8:43.52
Women's 400mH	Zuzana Hejnová; CZE | 54.12	Lashinda Demus; USA | 54.26	Melaine Walker; JAM | 54.44	Denisa Rosolová; CZE | 54.73	Ajoke Odumosu; NGR | 54.90	T'erea Brown; USA | 54.98	Aurelie Chaboudez; FRA | 57.93	Tiffany Williams; USA | 1:05.78
Women's Pole Vault	Silke Spiegelburg; GER | 4.82 m	Yarisley Silva; CUB | 4.62 m	Jiřina Ptáčníková; CZE | 4.62 m	Holly Bradshaw; GBR | 4.62 m	Fabiana Murer; BRA | 4.54 m	Svetlana Feofanova; RUS | 4.54 m	Martina Strutz; GER | 4.54 m	Vanessa Boslak; FRA | 4.45 m
Women's Triple Jump	Caterine Ibarguen; COL | 14.85 m	Kimberly Williams; JAM | 14.50 m	Olga Rypakova; KAZ | 14.46 m	Dana Velďáková; SVK | 14.16 m	Dailenys Alcántara; CUB | 14.05 m	Patrícia Mamona; POR | 13.76 m	Teresa Nzola Meso; FRA | 13.52 m	
Women's Discus Throw	Sandra Perković; CRO | 65.29 m	Nadine Müller; GER | 64.64 m	Yarelis Barrios; CUB | 64.49 m	Stephanie Brown-Trafton; USA | 63.70 m	Zinaida Sendriutė; LTU | 61.13 m	Nataliya Semenova; UKR | 59.91 m	Melina Robert-Michon; FRA | 59.60 m	Aretha D. Thurmond; USA | 59.10 m

Stockholm
Event	1st +4 pts	2nd +2 pts	3rd +1 pts	4th ⠀	5th ⠀	6th ⠀	7th ⠀	8th ⠀
Men's 100m (+0.7 m/s)	Ryan Bailey; USA | 9.93	Nesta Carter; JAM | 10.06	Michael Frater; JAM | 10.12	Darvis Patton; USA | 10.15	Adam Gemili; GBR | 10.22	Richard Thompson; TTO | 10.23	Gerald Phiri; ZAM | 10.24	Nil de Oliveira; SWE | 10.45
Men's 800m	Mohammed Aman; ETH | 1:43.56	Taoufik Makhloufi; ALG | 1:43.71	Abraham Kipchirchir Rotich; KEN | 1:44.23	Edwin Kiplagat Melly; KEN | 1:44.32	Abubaker Kaki; SUD | 1:44.42	Marcin Lewandowski; POL | 1:44.96	Adam Kszczot; POL | 1:45.36	Duane Solomon; USA | 1:46.80
Men's 3000m	Isiah Kiplangat Koech; KEN | 7:30.43	Caleb Mwangangi Ndiku; KEN | 7:30.99	John Kipkoech; KEN | 7:34.03	Edwin Cheruiyot Soi; KEN | 7:34.75	Vincent Kiprop Chepkok; KEN | 7:35.04	Evan Jager; USA | 7:35.16	Arne Gabius; GER | 7:35.43	Collis Birmingham; AUS | 7:35.45
Men's 400mH	Michael Tinsley; USA | 48.50	Félix Sánchez; DOM | 48.93	Leford Green; JAM | 48.97	Jehue Gordon; TTO | 49.00	Georg Fleischhauer; GER | 49.79	Rhys Williams; GBR | 49.93	Michael Bultheel; BEL | 50.02	Angelo Taylor; USA | 50.41
Men's Triple Jump	Christian Taylor; USA | 17.11 m	Seref Osmanoglu; UKR | 17.04 m	Lyukman Adams; RUS | DQ	Will Claye; USA | 16.88 m	Tosin Oke; NGR | 16.76 m	Samyr Laine; HAI | 16.68 m	Henry Frayne; AUS | 16.07 m	Benjamin Compaoré; FRA | NM
Men's Shot Put	Reese Hoffa; USA | 21.24 m	Tomasz Majewski; POL | 21.01 m	Ryan Whiting; USA | 20.94 m	Dylan Armstrong; CAN | 20.68 m	Christian Cantwell; USA | 20.58 m	Maksim Sidorov; RUS | DQ	Niklas Arrhenius; SWE | 18.86 m	Leif Arrhenius; SWE | 18.36 m
Men's Javelin Throw	Tero Pitkämäki; FIN | 86.98 m	Vítězslav Veselý; CZE | 83.74 m	Oleksandr Pyatnytsya; UKR | DQ	Antti Ruuskanen; FIN | 79.94 m	Vadims Vasiļevskis; LAT | 79.34 m	Ivan Zaytsev; UZB | 78.61 m	Gabriel Wallin; SWE | 77.00 m	Kim Amb; SWE | 76.06 m
Women's 200m (0.0 m/s)	Charonda Williams; USA | 22.82	Bianca Knight; USA | 22.86	Mariya Ryemyen; UKR | 22.94	Anneisha McLaughlin-Whilby; JAM | 22.96	Jeneba Tarmoh; USA | 23.00	Sherone Simpson; JAM | 23.15	Murielle Ahouré-Demps; CIV | 23.21	Aleksandra Fedoriva-Spayer; RUS | 23.26
Women's 400m	Sanya Richards-Ross; USA | 49.89	Amantle Montsho; BOT | 50.03	Christine Ohuruogu; GBR | 50.77	Antonina Krivoshapka; RUS | DQ	Francena McCorory; USA | 51.08	DeeDee Trotter; USA | 51.75	Yuliya Gushchina; RUS | DQ	Moa Hjelmer; SWE | 52.88
Women's 1500m	Maryam Yusuf Jamal; BRN | 4:01.19	Mimi Belete; BRN | 4:01.72	Abeba Aregawi; ETH | 4:02.04	Shannon Rowbury; USA | 4:03.15	Jenny Simpson; USA | 4:04.71	Natallia Kareiva; BLR | DQ	Hellen Obiri; KEN | 4:05.39	Laura Weightman; GBR | 4:06.09
Women's 100mH (+0.5 m/s)	Dawn Harper-Nelson; USA | 12.65	Kellie Wells; USA | 12.76	Alina Talay; BLR | 12.79	Ginnie Crawford; USA | 12.83	Queen Claye; USA | 12.89	Beate Schrott; AUT | 12.93	Brigitte Ann Foster-Hylton; JAM | 12.96	Phylicia George; CAN | 13.26
Women's 3000mSC	Yuliya Zaripova; RUS | DQ	Habiba Ghribi; TUN | 9:10.36	Etenesh Diro; ETH | 9:14.07	Lidya Chepkurui; KEN | 9:14.98	Ancuţa Bobocel; ROU | 9:25.70	Mercy Wanjiku Njoroge; KEN | 9:27.20	Zemzem Ahmed; ETH | 9:31.27	Emma Coburn; USA | 9:31.55
Women's High Jump	Anna Chicherova; RUS | 2.00 m	Svetlana Shkolina; RUS | DQ	Tia Hellebaut; BEL | 1.94 m	Ruth Beitia; ESP | 1.94 m	Olena Holosha; UKR | 1.88 m	Irina Gordeyeva; RUS | 1.88 m	Airinė Palšytė; LTU | 1.88 m	Svetlana Radzivil; UZB | 1.84 m
Women's Pole Vault	Yarisley Silva; CUB | 4.70 m	Silke Spiegelburg; GER | 4.55 m	Fabiana Murer; BRA | 4.55 m	Lisa Ryzih; GER | 4.46 m	Jiřina Ptáčníková; CZE | 4.46 m	Angelica Bengtsson; SWE | 4.46 m	Holly Bradshaw; GBR | 4.46 m	Alana Boyd; AUS | 4.31 m
Women's Long Jump	Yelena Sokolova; RUS | 6.82 m	Nastassia Mironchyk-Ivanova; BLR | DQ	Janay Deloach; USA | 6.69 m	Shara Proctor; GBR | 6.68 m	Ineta Radēviča; LAT | DQ	Anna Klyashtornaya; RUS | DQ	Lyudmila Kolchanova; RUS | 6.39 m	Brittney Reese; USA | 6.23 m
Women's Shot Put	Valerie Adams; NZL | 20.26 m	Yevgeniya Kolodko; RUS | DQ	Christina Schwanitz; GER | 18.72 m	Natalya Mikhnevich; BLR | 18.51 m	Michelle Carter; USA | 18.39 m	Cleopatra Borel; TTO | 18.11 m	Irina Tarasova; RUS | DQ	Úrsula Ruiz; ESP | 17.28 m
Women's Discus Throw	Sandra Perković; CRO | 68.77 m	Darya Pishchalnikova; RUS | DQ	Nadine Müller; GER | 65.07 m	Yarelis Barrios; CUB | 64.29 m	Stephanie Brown-Trafton; USA | 63.34 m	Żaneta Glanc; POL | 61.65 m	Zinaida Sendriutė; LTU | 60.09 m	Melina Robert-Michon; FRA | 59.95 m

Lausanne
Event	1st +4 pts	2nd +2 pts	3rd +1 pts	4th ⠀	5th ⠀	6th ⠀	7th ⠀	8th ⠀
Men's 200m (+1.4 m/s)	Usain Bolt; JAM | 19.58	Churandy Martina; NED | 19.85	Nickel Ashmeade; JAM | 19.94	Jason Young; JAM | 20.00	Warren Weir; JAM | 20.03	Wallace Spearmon; USA | 20.10	Marvin Anderson; JAM | 20.60	
Men's 400m	Kirani James; GRN | 44.37	Luguelín Santos; DOM | 45.03	Kévin Borlée; BEL | 45.27	Rusheen McDonald; JAM | 45.34	Pavel Maslák; CZE | 45.48	Martyn Rooney; GBR | 45.52	Lalonde Gordon; TTO | 45.62	Conrad Williams; GBR | 45.82
Men's 1500m	Silas Kiplagat; KEN | 3:31.78	Mekonnen Gebremedhin; ETH | 3:31.86	Matthew Centrowitz Jr. USA | 3:31.96	Nixon Kiplimo Chepseba; KEN | 3:32.31	Caleb Mwangangi Ndiku; KEN | 3:32.39	Collins Cheboi; KEN | 3:33.22	Bethwell Birgen; KEN | 3:33.25	Benson Seurei; KEN | 3:33.76
Men's 110mH (-0.6 m/s)	Jason Richardson; USA | 13.08	David Oliver; USA | 13.14	Hansle Parchment; JAM | 13.15	Sergey Shubenkov; RUS | 13.27	Jeff Porter; USA | 13.30	Garfield Darien; FRA | 13.42	Joel Brown; USA | 13.62	Aries Merritt; USA | DQ
Men's 3000mSC	Paul Kipsiele Koech; KEN | 8:05.80	Jairus Kipchoge Birech; KEN | 8:06.38	Bernard Nganga; KEN | 8:08.33	Abel Kiprop Mutai; KEN | 8:08.36	Conseslus Kipruto; KEN | 8:15.79	Hilal Yego; KEN | 8:15.99	Roba Gari; ETH | 8:25.97	Ivan Lukyanov; MDA | 8:27.82
Men's High Jump	Mutaz Essa Barshim; QAT | 2.39 m	Robbie Grabarz; GBR | 2.37 m	Ivan Ukhov; RUS | DQ	Andrii Protsenko; UKR | 2.30 m	Bohdan Bondarenko; UKR | 2.27 m	Aleksandr Shustov; RUS | 2.27 m	Donald Thomas; BAH | 2.24 m	Jesse Williams; USA | 2.24 m
Men's Pole Vault	Renaud Lavillenie; FRA | 5.80 m	Malte Mohr; GER | 5.80 m	Steven Lewis; GBR | 5.80 m	Konstantinos Filippidis; GRE | 5.80 m	Steven Hooker; AUS | 5.70 m	Brad Walker; USA | 5.70 m	Romain Mesnil; FRA | 5.70 m	Dmitriy Starodubtsev; RUS | DQ
Men's Discus Throw	Gerd Kanter; EST | 65.79 m	Lawrence Okoye; GBR | 65.27 m	Frank Casanas; ESP | 65.24 m	Martin Wierig; GER | 64.52 m	Virgilijus Alekna; LTU | 64.34 m	Erik Cadée; NED | 63.83 m	Ehsan Hadadi; IRI | 62.67 m	Benn Harradine; AUS | 62.66 m
Women's 100m (-0.1 m/s)	Carmelita Jeter; USA | 10.86	Shelly-Ann Fraser-Pryce; JAM | 10.86	Kelly-Ann Baptiste; TTO | 10.93	Veronica Campbell-Brown; JAM | 10.99	Kerron Stewart; JAM | 11.10	Jeneba Tarmoh; USA | 11.13	Murielle Ahouré-Demps; CIV | 11.14	Olesya Povh; UKR | 11.31
Women's 800m	Pamela Jelimo; KEN | 1:57.59	Mariya Savinova; RUS | DQ	Yelena Kotulskaya; RUS | 1:58.36	Diane Cummins; CAN | 2:00.62	Hilary Stellingwerff; CAN | 2:01.22	Irina Maracheva; RUS | DQ	Nataliya Lupu; UKR | 2:04.27	Yekaterina Kupina; RUS | DNF
Women's 3000m	Mercy Cherono; KEN | 8:40.59	Sylvia Jebiwot Kibet; KEN | 8:42.44	Veronica Wanjiru; KEN | 8:43.54	Gelete Burka; ETH | 8:45.09	Azmera Gebru; ETH | 8:45.33	Buze Diriba; ETH | 8:45.38	Emebet Anteneh; ETH | 8:51.56	Almenesh Belete; BEL | 8:52.02
Women's 400mH	Kaliese Carter; JAM | 53.49	Melaine Walker; JAM | 53.74	Perri Shakes-Drayton; GBR | 53.83	Zuzana Hejnová; CZE | 53.96	Ajoke Odumosu; NGR | 54.68	Anna Ryzhykova; UKR | 55.28	Natalya Antyukh; RUS | DQ	Irina Kolesnichenko; RUS | DQ
Women's Long Jump	Yelena Sokolova; RUS | 6.89 m	Blessing Okagbare; NGR | 6.73 m	Janay Deloach; USA | 6.71 m	Shara Proctor; GBR | 6.68 m	Brittney Reese; USA | 6.66 m	Ineta Radēviča; LAT | DQ	Veronika Shutkova; BLR | 6.46 m	Nastassia Mironchyk-Ivanova; BLR | DQ
Women's Triple Jump	Olga Rypakova; KAZ | 14.68 m	Olha Saladukha; UKR | 14.42 m	Tatyana Lebedeva; RUS | 14.39 m	Kimberly Williams; JAM | 14.35 m	Hanna Minenko; UKR | 14.15 m	Viktoriya Gurova; RUS | DQ	Marija Šestak; SLO | 14.07 m	Yamilé Aldama; GBR | NM
Women's Shot Put	Valerie Adams; NZL | 20.95 m	Michelle Carter; USA | 19.60 m	Yevgeniya Kolodko; RUS | DQ	Cleopatra Borel; TTO | 18.50 m	Natalya Mikhnevich; BLR | 18.48 m	Irina Tarasova; RUS | DQ	Josephine Terlecki; GER | 17.47 m	Chiara Rosa; ITA | 16.98 m
Women's Javelin Throw	Barbora Špotáková; CZE | 67.19 m	Mariya Abakumova; RUS | 65.80 m	Sunette Viljoen; RSA | 64.08 m	Christina Obergföll; GER | 63.28 m	Madara Palameika; LAT | 62.74 m	Linda Stahl; GER | 62.73 m	Vera Markaryan; UKR | 61.07 m	Ásdís Hjálmsdóttir; ISL | 59.12 m

Birmingham
Event	1st +4 pts	2nd +2 pts	3rd +1 pts	4th ⠀	5th ⠀	6th ⠀	7th ⠀	8th ⠀
Men's 200m (0.0 m/s)	Nickel Ashmeade; JAM | 20.12	Tyson Gay; USA | DQ	Wallace Spearmon; USA | 20.23	Churandy Martina; NED | 20.36	Ryan Bailey; USA | 20.43	Adam Gemili; GBR | 20.53	Christian Malcolm; GBR | 20.80	Mario Forsythe; JAM | 20.80
Men's 400m	Angelo Taylor; USA | 44.93	Luguelín Santos; DOM | 44.96	Jonathan Borlée; BEL | 45.15	Rabah Yousif; SUD | 45.54	Calvin Smith; USA | 45.66	Martyn Rooney; GBR | 45.69	Rusheen McDonald; JAM | 45.88	Conrad Williams; GBR | 46.52
Men's 1500m	Mekonnen Gebremedhin; ETH | 3:34.80	Nixon Kiplimo Chepseba; KEN | 3:35.09	James Kiplagat Magut; KEN | 3:35.74	Silas Kiplagat; KEN | 3:35.74	Bethwell Birgen; KEN | 3:35.88	Nathan Brannen; CAN | 3:36.07	Abdelaati Iguider; MAR | 3:36.27	Matthew Centrowitz Jr. USA | 3:37.93
Men's 110mH (-0.9 m/s)	Aries Merritt; USA | 12.95	Jason Richardson; USA | 12.98	David Oliver; USA | 13.28	Ryan Wilson; USA | 13.34	Ryan Brathwaite; BAR | 13.42	Lawrence Clarke; GBR | 13.52	Lehann Fourie; RSA | 13.59	Hansle Parchment; JAM | 13.76
Men's 3000mSC	Jairus Kipchoge Birech; KEN | 8:20.27	Abel Kiprop Mutai; KEN | 8:25.42	Donn Cabral; USA | 8:32.55	Haron Lagat; KEN | 8:33.17	Łukasz Oslizlo; POL | 8:42.38	Rob Mullett; GBR | 8:47.09	Youcef Abdi; AUS | 9:09.45	Alexandre Genest; CAN | DNS
Men's High Jump	Robbie Grabarz; GBR | 2.32 m	Andrey Silnov; RUS | 2.28 m	Ivan Ukhov; RUS | DQ	Mutaz Essa Barshim; QAT | 2.24 m	Donald Thomas; BAH | 2.24 m	Jamie Nieto; USA | 2.24 m	Mickaël Hanany; FRA | 2.24 m	Michael Mason; CAN | 2.20 m
Men's Long Jump	Aleksandr Menkov; RUS | 8.18 m	Christian Taylor; USA | 7.95 m	Greg Rutherford; GBR | 7.88 m	Chris Tomlinson; GBR | 7.78 m	JJ Jegede; GBR | 7.78 m	Sebastian Bayer; GER | 7.76 m	Mitchell Watt; AUS | 7.68 m	Elvijs Misāns; LAT | 7.50 m
Men's Discus Throw	Robert Harting; GER | 66.64 m	Gerd Kanter; EST | 65.79 m	Virgilijus Alekna; LTU | 65.63 m	Lawrence Okoye; GBR | 64.49 m	Piotr Małachowski; POL | 63.41 m	Frank Casanas; ESP | 62.49 m	Benn Harradine; AUS | 60.71 m	Abdul Buhari; GBR | 57.47 m
Women's 100m (+0.7 m/s)	Carmelita Jeter; USA | 10.81	Shelly-Ann Fraser-Pryce; JAM | 10.90	Alexandria Anderson; USA | 11.22	Gloria Asumnu; NGR | 11.22	Charonda Williams; USA | 11.23	Aleen Bailey; JAM | 11.24	Myriam Soumaré; FRA | 11.30	Anyika Onuora; GBR | 11.38
Women's 800m	Mariya Savinova; RUS | DQ	Pamela Jelimo; KEN | 2:01.43	Marilyn Okoro; GBR | 2:01.96	Maggie Vessey; USA | 2:02.01	Lynsey Sharp; GBR | 2:02.28	Winny Chebet; KEN | 2:03.20	Jemma Simpson; GBR | 2:03.33	Jessica Warner-Judd; GBR | 2:03.39
Women's 3000m	Mercy Cherono; KEN | 8:41.21	Vivian Jepkemei Cheruiyot; KEN | 8:41.22	Sally Kipyego; KEN | 8:42.74	Viola Jelagat Kibiwot; KEN | 8:43.75	Veronica Wanjiru; KEN | 8:45.61	Julia Bleasdale; GBR | 8:46.38	Gelete Burka; ETH | 8:48.84	Emebet Anteneh; ETH | 8:52.89
Women's 400mH	Kaliese Carter; JAM | 53.78	Perri Shakes-Drayton; GBR | 54.08	Zuzana Hejnová; CZE | 54.14	Natalya Antyukh; RUS | DQ	Denisa Rosolová; CZE | 55.94	Eilidh Doyle; GBR | 55.98	Elodie Ouédraogo; BEL | 56.41	Irina Kolesnichenko; RUS | DQ
Women's Pole Vault	Jennifer Suhr; USA | 4.65 m	Yarisley Silva; CUB | 4.65 m	Fabiana Murer; BRA | 4.42 m	Jiřina Ptáčníková; CZE | 4.42 m	Alana Boyd; AUS | 4.42 m	Lisa Ryzih; GER | 4.22 m	Mary Saxer; USA | 4.22 m	Silke Spiegelburg; GER | NH m
Women's Triple Jump	Olha Saladukha; UKR | 14.40 m	Kimberly Williams; JAM | 14.37 m	Olga Rypakova; KAZ | 14.34 m	Trecia Kaye Smith; JAM | 14.09 m	Tatyana Lebedeva; RUS | 13.87 m	Keila Costa; BRA | 13.84 m	Dana Velďáková; SVK | 13.81 m	Patrícia Mamona; POR | 13.30 m
Women's Shot Put	Valerie Adams; NZL | 20.52 m	Michelle Carter; USA | 18.71 m	Cleopatra Borel; TTO | 18.36 m	Christina Schwanitz; GER | 18.20 m	Yevgeniya Kolodko; RUS | DQ	Natalya Mikhnevich; BLR | 17.89 m	Josephine Terlecki; GER | 16.39 m	Eden Francis; GBR | 15.89 m
Women's Javelin Throw	Barbora Špotáková; CZE | 66.08 m	Christina Obergföll; GER | 63.19 m	Vera Markaryan; UKR | 62.82 m	Sunette Viljoen; RSA | 62.13 m	Kathryn Mitchell; AUS | 60.47 m	Madara Palameika; LAT | 57.67 m	Katharina Molitor; GER | 57.03 m	Ásdís Hjálmsdóttir; ISL | 53.56 m

Zurich
Event	1st +8 pts	2nd +4 pts	3rd +2 pts	4th ⠀	5th ⠀	6th ⠀	7th ⠀	8th ⠀
Men's 200m (0.0 m/s)	Usain Bolt; JAM | 19.66	Nickel Ashmeade; JAM | 19.85	Jason Young; JAM | 20.08	Warren Weir; JAM | 20.18	Wallace Spearmon; USA | 20.22	Churandy Martina; NED | 20.62	Alex Wilson; SUI | 20.70	Patrick van Luijk; NED | 21.04
Men's 800m	Mohammed Aman; ETH | 1:42.53	David Rudisha; KEN | 1:42.81	Leonard Kirwa Kosencha; KEN | 1:44.29	Duane Solomon; USA | 1:44.42	Andrew Osagie; GBR | 1:44.94	Michael Rimmer; GBR | 1:45.06	Timothy Kitum; KEN | 1:45.18	Anthony Chemut; KEN | 1:45.52
Men's 5000m	Isiah Kiplangat Koech; KEN | 12:58.98	Thomas Pkemei Longosiwa; KEN | 12:59.24	Bernard Lagat; USA | 12:59.92	Dejen Gebremeskel; ETH | 13:00.83	John Kipkoech; KEN | 13:02.11	Tariku Bekele; ETH | 13:02.62	Yigrem Demelash; ETH | 13:04.14	Imane Merga; ETH | 13:07.24
Men's 400mH	Angelo Taylor; USA | 48.29	Omar Cisneros; CUB | 48.34	Jehue Gordon; TTO | 48.40	Félix Sánchez; DOM | 48.42	Javier Culson; PUR | 48.56	Leford Green; JAM | 49.05	Michael Tinsley; USA | 49.56	Rhys Williams; GBR | 50.91
Men's High Jump	Ivan Ukhov; RUS | DQ	Robbie Grabarz; GBR | 2.28 m	Andrey Silnov; RUS | 2.25 m	Jesse Williams; USA | 2.25 m	Mutaz Essa Barshim; QAT | 2.21 m	Andrii Protsenko; UKR | 2.21 m	Bohdan Bondarenko; UKR | 2.21 m	Jamie Nieto; USA | 2.21 m
Men's Pole Vault	Renaud Lavillenie; FRA | 5.70 m	Björn Otto; GER | 5.55 m	Jan Kudlička; CZE | 5.55 m	Steven Lewis; GBR | 5.55 m	Konstantinos Filippidis; GRE | 5.40 m	Yevgeniy Lukyanenko; RUS | NH m	Malte Mohr; GER | NH m	Karsten Dilla; GER | NH m
Men's Triple Jump	Fabrizio Donato; ITA | 17.29 m	Christian Taylor; USA | 17.16 m	Benjamin Compaoré; FRA | 16.96 m	Seref Osmanoglu; UKR | 16.57 m	Daniele Greco; ITA | 16.41 m	Samyr Laine; HAI | 16.38 m	Fabrizio Schembri; ITA | 16.24 m	Alexander Hochuli; SUI | 15.85 m
Men's Shot Put indoor	Reese Hoffa; USA | 21.64 m	Ryan Whiting; USA | 21.49 m	Tomasz Majewski; POL | 21.18 m	Dylan Armstrong; CAN | 20.54 m	Cory Martin; USA | 20.25 m	Asmir Kolašinac; SRB | 20.18 m	Marco Fortes; POR | 19.23 m	David Storl; GER | NM
Men's Javelin Throw	Tero Pitkämäki; FIN | 85.27 m	Antti Ruuskanen; FIN | 83.36 m	Oleksandr Pyatnytsya; UKR | DQ	Vítězslav Veselý; CZE | 80.54 m	Julius Yego; KEN | 78.74 m	Valeriy Iordan; RUS | 77.96 m	Ari Mannio; FIN | 77.59 m	Vadims Vasiļevskis; LAT | 76.00 m
Women's 100m (-0.4 m/s)	Shelly-Ann Fraser-Pryce; JAM | 10.83	Carmelita Jeter; USA | 10.97	Allyson Felix; USA | 11.02	Blessing Okagbare; NGR | 11.16	Jeneba Tarmoh; USA | 11.20	Kerron Stewart; JAM | 11.25	Ezinne Okparaebo; NOR | 11.37	Ivet Lalova-Collio; BUL | 11.39
Women's 400m	Sanya Richards-Ross; USA | 50.21	Amantle Montsho; BOT | 50.33	Rose-Marie Whyte-Robinson; JAM | 50.41	Antonina Krivoshapka; RUS | DQ	Francena McCorory; USA | 51.09	Natalya Antyukh; RUS | DQ	DeeDee Trotter; USA | 52.14	Christine Ohuruogu; GBR | 52.40
Women's 1500m	Abeba Aregawi; ETH | 4:05.29	Mercy Cherono; KEN | 4:06.42	Shannon Rowbury; USA | 4:07.14	Viola Jelagat Kibiwot; KEN | 4:07.27	Mimi Belete; BRN | 4:07.95	Hannah England; GBR | 4:07.99	Jenny Simpson; USA | 4:08.38	Brenda Martinez; USA | 4:08.84
Women's 100mH (+0.3 m/s)	Dawn Harper-Nelson; USA | 12.59	Queen Claye; USA | 12.68	Kellie Wells; USA | 12.69	Ginnie Crawford; USA | 12.73	Priscilla Schliep; CAN | 12.79	Jessica Zelinka; CAN | 12.87	Alina Talay; BLR | 12.93	Phylicia George; CAN | 13.00
Women's 3000mSC	Etenesh Diro; ETH | 9:24.97	Hiwot Ayalew; ETH | 9:26.99	Hyvin Kiyeng; KEN | 9:29.70	Lidya Chepkurui; KEN | 9:29.90	Habiba Ghribi; TUN | 9:32.54	Ancuţa Bobocel; ROU | 9:33.23	Mercy Wanjiku Njoroge; KEN | 9:34.23	Antje Möldner-Schmidt; GER | 9:35.12
Women's Long Jump	Yelena Sokolova; RUS | 6.92 m	Blessing Okagbare; NGR | 6.85 m	Shara Proctor; GBR | 6.80 m	Olga Kucherenko; RUS | DQ	Nastassia Mironchyk-Ivanova; BLR | DQ	Lyudmila Kolchanova; RUS | 6.53 m	Irene Pusterla; SUI | 6.50 m	Janay Deloach; USA | 6.45 m
Women's Shot Put indoor	Valerie Adams; NZL | 20.81 m	Michelle Carter; USA | 19.25 m	Cleopatra Borel; TTO | 18.66 m	Christina Schwanitz; GER | 18.61 m	Yevgeniya Kolodko; RUS | DQ	Natalya Mikhnevich; BLR | 18.49 m	Irina Tarasova; RUS | DQ	Nadine Kleinert; GER | 17.82 m
Women's Discus Throw	Sandra Perković; CRO | 63.97 m	Yarelis Barrios; CUB | 61.73 m	Żaneta Glanc; POL | 61.31 m	Stephanie Brown-Trafton; USA | 60.99 m	Nadine Müller; GER | 60.72 m	Zinaida Sendriutė; LTU | 60.02 m	Melina Robert-Michon; FRA | 59.16 m	Julia Harting; GER | 56.82 m

Brussels
Event	1st +8 pts	2nd +4 pts	3rd +2 pts	4th ⠀	5th ⠀	6th ⠀	7th ⠀	8th ⠀
Men's 100m (+0.3 m/s)	Usain Bolt; JAM | 9.86	Nesta Carter; JAM | 9.96	Kemar Bailey-Cole; JAM | 9.97	Kim Collins; SKN | 10.03	Nickel Ashmeade; JAM | 10.03	Ryan Bailey; USA | 10.04	Jimmy Vicaut; FRA | 10.06	Gerald Phiri; ZAM | 10.23
Men's 400m	Kévin Borlée; BEL | 44.75	Jonathan Borlée; BEL | 45.02	Lalonde Gordon; TTO | 45.13	Luguelín Santos; DOM | 45.31	Martyn Rooney; GBR | 45.56	Calvin Smith; USA | 45.58	Angelo Taylor; USA | 45.80	Allodin Fothergill; JAM | 45.87
Men's 1500m	Silas Kiplagat; KEN | 3:31.98	Mekonnen Gebremedhin; ETH | 3:32.10	Bethwell Birgen; KEN | 3:32.24	Matthew Centrowitz Jr. USA | 3:32.47	Asbel Kiprop; KEN | 3:32.88	Daniel Kipchirchir Komen; KEN | 3:32.98	Nixon Kiplimo Chepseba; KEN | 3:33.22	Taoufik Makhloufi; ALG | 3:33.42
Men's 110mH (+0.3 m/s)	Aries Merritt; USA | 12.80	Jason Richardson; USA | 13.05	Hansle Parchment; JAM | 13.14	Sergey Shubenkov; RUS | 13.21	David Oliver; USA | 13.21	Lehann Fourie; RSA | 13.24	Ryan Wilson; USA | 13.26	Ryan Brathwaite; BAR | 13.39
Men's 3000mSC	Brimin Kiprop Kipruto; KEN | 8:03.11	Conseslus Kipruto; KEN | 8:03.70	Paul Kipsiele Koech; KEN | 8:04.01	Jairus Kipchoge Birech; KEN | 8:05.71	Hilal Yego; KEN | 8:12.63	Abel Kiprop Mutai; KEN | 8:13.49	Ángel Mullera; ESP | 8:13.71	Silas Kosgei Kitum; KEN | 8:16.48
Men's Long Jump	Aleksandr Menkov; RUS | 8.29 m	Sergey Morgunov; RUS | 8.04 m	Godfrey Khotso Mokoena; RSA | 8.03 m	Chris Tomlinson; GBR | 7.96 m	Tyrone Smith; BER | 7.82 m	Ignisious Gaisah; GHA | 7.81 m	Nicolas Stempnick; BEL | 7.55 m	Hans van Alphen; BEL | 7.40 m
Men's Discus Throw	Gerd Kanter; EST | 66.84 m	Martin Wierig; GER | 66.05 m	Virgilijus Alekna; LTU | 65.78 m	Erik Cadée; NED | 65.48 m	Lawrence Okoye; GBR | 64.67 m	Vikas Gowda; IND | 63.67 m	Frank Casanas; ESP | 62.79 m	Benn Harradine; AUS | 62.02 m
Women's 200m (+0.1 m/s)	Myriam Soumaré; FRA | 22.63	Anneisha McLaughlin-Whilby; JAM | 22.70	Charonda Williams; USA | 22.74	Samantha Henry-Robinson; JAM | 22.84	Bianca Knight; USA | 22.86	Mariya Ryemyen; UKR | 23.06	Libania Grenot; ITA | 23.17	Aleksandra Fedoriva-Spayer; RUS | 23.52
Women's 800m	Francine Niyonsaba; BDI | 1:56.59	Pamela Jelimo; KEN | 1:57.24	Mariya Savinova; RUS | DQ	Brenda Martinez; USA | 1:59.14	Anna Willard; USA | 1:59.16	Halima Hachlaf; MAR | 2:01.01	Lynsey Sharp; GBR | 2:01.49	Jemma Simpson; GBR | 2:01.78
Women's 5000m	Vivian Jepkemei Cheruiyot; KEN | 14:46.01	Mercy Cherono; KEN | 14:47.18	Viola Jelagat Kibiwot; KEN | 14:47.88	Gelete Burka; ETH | 14:51.66	Sylvia Jebiwot Kibet; KEN | 14:53.04	Buze Diriba; ETH | 14:53.06	Sally Kipyego; KEN | 14:56.04	Almaz Ayana; ETH | 14:57.97
Women's 400mH	Kaliese Carter; JAM | 53.69	Perri Shakes-Drayton; GBR | 53.89	Zuzana Hejnová; CZE | 54.09	Ajoke Odumosu; NGR | 55.47	Anna Ryzhykova; UKR | 55.61	Elodie Ouédraogo; BEL | 56.44	Ristananna Tracey; JAM | 56.86	Vera Barbosa; POR | 58.41
Women's High Jump	Svetlana Shkolina; RUS | DQ	Anna Chicherova; RUS | 1.95 m	Tia Hellebaut; BEL | 1.92 m	Eleriin Haas; EST | 1.92 m	Mélanie Melfort; FRA | 1.89 m	Chaunte Lowe; USA | 1.89 m	Olena Holosha; UKR | 1.85 m	Levern Spencer; LCA | 1.85 m
Women's Pole Vault	Silke Spiegelburg; GER | 4.75 m	Fabiana Murer; BRA | 4.65 m	Anastasiya Savchenko; RUS | 4.55 m	Yarisley Silva; CUB | 4.55 m	Angelica Bengtsson; SWE | 4.45 m	Alana Boyd; AUS | 4.45 m	Lisa Ryzih; GER | 4.35 m	Jiřina Ptáčníková; CZE | 4.35 m
Women's Triple Jump	Olga Rypakova; KAZ | 14.72 m	Olha Saladukha; UKR | 14.40 m	Marija Šestak; SLO | 14.10 m	Hanna Minenko; UKR | 13.93 m	Kimberly Williams; JAM | 13.90 m	Dana Velďáková; SVK | 13.88 m	Svetlana Bolshakova; BEL | 13.85 m	Viktoriya Gurova; RUS | DQ
Women's Javelin Throw	Barbora Špotáková; CZE | 66.91 m	Sunette Viljoen; RSA | 65.33 m	Vera Markaryan; UKR | 64.52 m	Mariya Abakumova; RUS | 62.27 m	Madara Palameika; LAT | 61.46 m	Martina Ratej; SLO | DQ	Katharina Molitor; GER | 59.15 m	Linda Stahl; GER | 56.77 m
