= Nganga (surname) =

Nganga is a Kenyan surname. Notable people with the surname include:

- Bernard Nganga (born 1985), Kenyan steeplechase runner
- Evelyne Nganga (born 1986), Kenyan long-distance runner
- Kimani Nganga Maruge (c. 1920 – 2009), Kenyan Roman catholic
