= Hillary Yego =

Kenyan long-distance runner

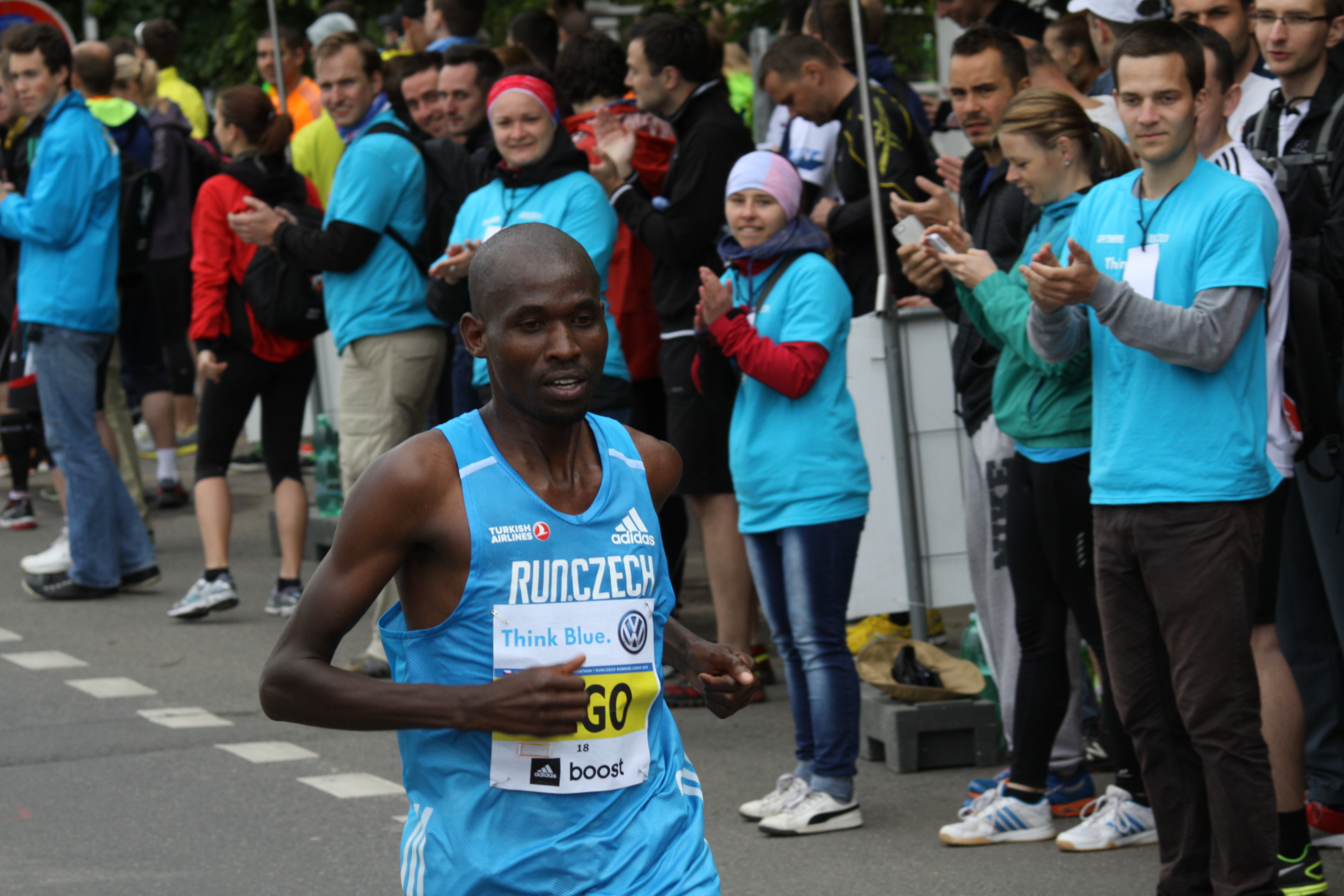
- Hillary Yego during Prague International Marathon in 2014

Medal record

Men's athletics

Representing Kenya

World Youth Championships
Gold medal – first place	2009 Brixen	2000 m s'chase

Hillary Kipsang Yego (born 2 April 1992) is a Kenyan long-distance runner who competes in the steeplechase. He has a personal best of 8:03.57 minutes for the event. He was the gold medallist at the 2009 World Youth Championships in Athletics.

== Career ==
He began training alongside Edwin Soi and made his breakthrough in the 2009 season. After finishing second to Peter Lagat in the 2000 metres steeplechase at the national youth trials he was chosen for the 2009 World Youth Championships in Athletics. There he beat his Kenyan rival in the final stretch of the race, winning the gold medal in a time of 5:25.33 minutes in spite of his poor hurdling technique. Yego attempted to gain qualification for the senior event at the Kenyan World trials 3000 metres steeplechase race, but finished in ninth place. A third-place finish at the national junior trials the following year meant he missed a berth for the steeplechase at the 2010 World Junior Championships in Athletics. He ran on the European circuit for the first time that year and set a best of 8:19.50 minutes for third at the KBC Night of Athletics.

Yego had his first season as a senior athlete in 2011 and he performed on the major IAAF circuits. He set a meet record at the Colorful Daegu Championships Meeting in May then gained his first top three placing at an IAAF Diamond League race in Shanghai with a personal best of 8:07.71 minutes. He was runner-up at the Golden Spike Ostrava meet and won at the Hanžeković Memorial, but was out of the top three at other Diamond League races. He ranked eighth in the world in the steeplechase that year. He experimented with road running events, running 1:02:26 for the half marathon in 2011 and 2:19:21 hours for the marathon in 2012, but his skills were better suited to the steeplechase. He failed to make the 2012 Olympic team at the Kenyan Trials and did not make the top three at any 2012 IAAF Diamond League meet.

Yego returned his focus to just the steeplechase in 2013. He was third in Shanghai with a personal best of 8:03.57 minutes and was victorious at the IAAF World Challenge Beijing with a meet record. He was third at the Bislett Games but again missed out on the major championship after an eleventh-place finish at the Kenyan World Trials. Yego had his first major victory at the DN Galan in August 2013. He won the race ahead of the best steeplechasers of his generation: Paul Kipsiele Koech, Brimin Kiprop Kipruto, Ezekiel Kemboi and Conseslus Kipruto.

He became eligible to compete internationally for Turkey in February 2020. As is common with Turkish transfers, he changed his name, becoming known as Hilal Yego.

== Personal bests ==
- 3000 metres steeplechase: 8:03.57 min (2013)
- 2000 metres steeplechase (youth): 5:25.33 min (2009)
- 3000 metres: 7:53.18 min (2010)
- Half marathon: 1:02:26 hours (2011)
- Marathon: 2:19:21 hours (2012)

== International competitions ==
Year	Competition	Venue	Position	Event	Notes
2009	World Youth Championships	Brixen, Italy	1st	2000 metres steeplechase	
