= Lydiah Chepkurui =

Kenyan track and field athlete

Medal record

Women's athletics

Representing Kenya

World Championships
Silver medal – second place	2013 Moscow	3000 m st.

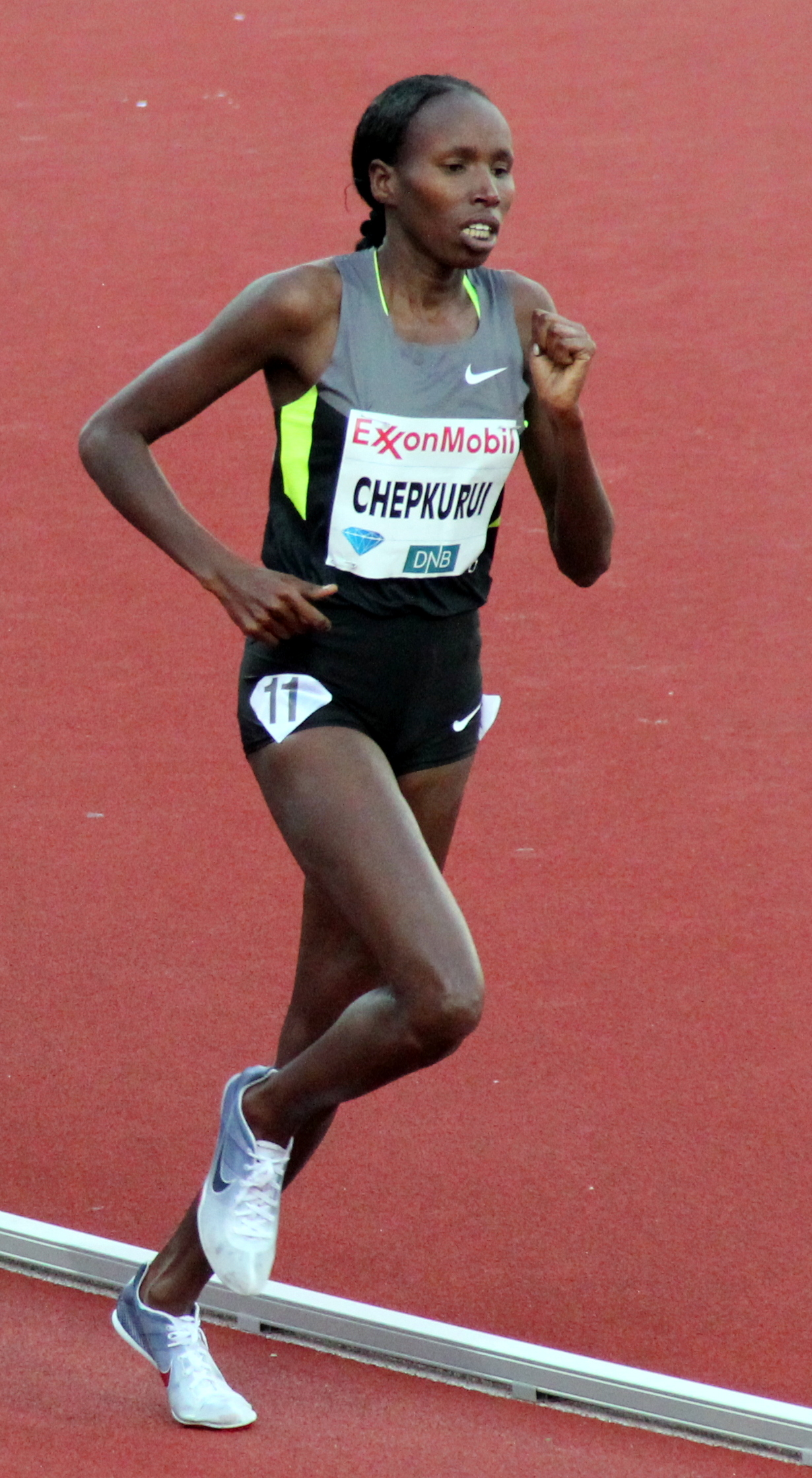
Lidya Chepkurui - during Bislett Games in 2012

Lydiah Tum Chepkurui (born 23 August 1984) is a Kenyan track and field athlete who competes in the 3000 metres steeplechase. Her best of 9:13.75 minutes ranks her in the top twenty of all-time in the event.

She competed at a relatively low level of athletics in her early career. She was third in the 800 metres at the 2006 Kenyan Police Championships. She was one of three Kenyan entrants in the heptathlon at the 2010 African Championships in Athletics and, although her run of 2:15.40 minutes in the final 800 m event was easily the best in the field, she finished last with a total of 3676 points as she performed to a poor international standard in the other events (including 20.76 seconds for the 100 metres hurdles and 6.83 m for the shot put).

A switch to the steeplechase in 2011 brought her to an international standard for the first time. She reduced her best time to 9:30.73 minutes over the course of the season, finished fifth at the London Grand Prix and placed fourth at the 2011 All-Africa Games. She did not reach the Olympics the following year, ending up sixth at the Kenyan Trials, but performed well on the 2012 IAAF Diamond League circuit. She came third in Shanghai, fifth at the Bislett Games, second at the Meeting Areva, and fourth at the Weltklasse Zurich and DN Galan meets. Her best that year came in Stockholm and the time of 9:14.98 minutes ranked her eighth in the world that year. This was also enough to rank her in the top twenty of all-time in the relatively new event.

Chepkurui produced her first major victory at the Doha Diamond League meet in May 2013. She ran a personal best of 9:13.75 minutes and defeated a field including Olympic medallists such as Habiba Ghribi, Sofia Assefa and Milcah Chemos Cheywa.
