= Brahim Taleb =

Moroccan long-distance runner

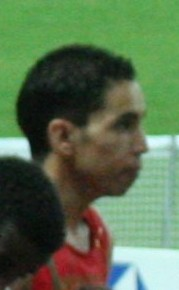
- Brahim Taleb in 2007

Personal information
- Nationality: Moroccan
- Born: February 16, 1985 (age 41)

Sport
- Sport: Athletics
- Event: 3000 metres steeplechase

Achievements and titles
- Personal best: 8:07.02 (2007)

Brahim Taleb (born 16 February 1985) is a Moroccan long-distance runner who specializes in the 3000 metres steeplechase.

He finished fifth at the 2001 World Youth Championships and fourth at the 2006 African Championships. He also competed at the 2007 World Championships and the 2008 Olympic Games without reaching the final.

At the 2012 Summer Olympics, he reached the final and finished in 11th.

His personal best time was 8:07.02 minutes, achieved in July 2007 in Heusden-Zolder.
