= Charonda Williams =

American sprinter

Charonda Regina Williams (born March 27, 1987) is an American track and field athlete who competes in the sprint events. She is a 200-meter dash specialist and has a personal record of 22.55 seconds. She represented the United States at the 2009 World Championships in Athletics in that event. She also runs in the 100-meter dash and has a best of 11.14 seconds.

Williams began taking part in local track and field events after graduating from Gompers High School. She started competing regionally at Laney College and won community college conference titles in the 100- and 200-meter dashes, as well as the long jump. She began to study childhood education and family studies at Arizona State University in 2007. In her first outdoor season for the Arizona State Sun Devils, she set personal records for the 100 m (11.41 seconds) and 200 m (23.09). She competed at the NCAA Indoor and the NCAA Outdoor Championships that season and won both the Pac-10 Conference sprint titles.

The following year she was 200 m runner-up at the NCAA indoors and was also a 60-meter dash finalist. She defended her Pac-10 titles, including a personal record run of 11.14 seconds in the 100 m. At the 2009 NCAA Outdoors she was second in the 200 m and sixth in the 100 m. The 2009 USA Outdoor Track and Field Championships saw her set a 200 m best of 22.55 seconds before going on to place fourth in the final. This earned her a place in the American World Championships squad and she was a semi-finalist in the women's 200 m in Berlin.

She did not compete collegiately in 2010 and turned professional instead. She won the 100 m at the Mt. SAC Relays in April and ran the 200 m at the adidas Grand Prix in New York in June. At the USA Outdoor Championships she reached the 200 m but finished last. Williams ran on the 2011 Diamond League circuit, including a runner-up finish in Doha. She ran a best of 52.71 seconds for the 400-meter dash in March, but did not perform well at the U.S. Championships, being eliminated in the semi-finals. Williams had a number of good performances in Europe in 2012, including a win at the FBK Games, podium placings at the Bislett Games and Meeting Areva, then a win at the London Grand Prix. She did not gain a place on the Olympic team, however, as she failed to reach the 200 m final at the 2012 United States Olympic Trials.

Williams qualified in the 200 meters to the final at the 2013 world championships in Moscow.
