= Elijah Greer =

American middle-distance runner

Personal information
- Nationality: American
- Born: October 24, 1990 (age 35) Lake Oswego, Oregon, U.S.

Sport
- Sport: Track
- Event: 800 meters
- College team: Oregon

Achievements and titles
- Personal bests: 800 meters: 1:44.91; 1500 meters: 3:43.56
- Updated on 11-14-14

Elijah Greer (born October 24, 1990) is an American middle distance runner who specializes in the 800 meters. Greer was the 800 meters champion running for University of Oregon at the 2013 NCAA D1 Outdoor T&F Championships.

== Running career ==
=== Youth career ===
Greer attended Lake Oswego High School in Lake Oswego, Oregon. At the 2008 Junior Outdoor USA Track & Field Championship held on the campus of Ohio State University, Elijah won the 800m gold medal, becoming the fastest American high school junior in history at 1:47.68. Elijah represented the United States in the 800 meters at the IAAF World Junior Championships in Bydgoszcz, Poland.

=== Collegiate career ===
At the 2012 US Olympic Track and Field Trials held at the University of Oregon, Elijah was the only collegian with eligibility racing in the 800m Finals, finishing sixth in a time of 1:45.40. In July 2012, Elijah was the only American collegian to race the 800m Paris Diamond League Meeting Areva at Saint-Denis, France as well as in the 800m London Diamond League Aviva Grand Prix at the Crystal Palace. He ended the 2012 outdoor season ranked 49 in the world by IAAF.

In March, 2013, Elijah won the 800m at the NCAA D1 Indoor Championships, held in Fayetteville, AR. He was ranked 16th in the world indoors for 2013 by the IAAF.

On April 20, 2013 Elijah ran the fastest 800 meters ever recorded in a collegiate dual track meet. His time of 1:46.20 against Arkansas during the Pepsi Invitational held at Historic Hayward Field in Eugene, Oregon broke a 35-year-old record. The previous record was set by Rayfield Beaton of USC in 1978.

Elijah won the NCAA Division 1 2013 Outdoor Championship in 1:46.58, becoming the 5th runner from the University of Oregon to win one of 7 800m titles in the Outdoor event as well as the first Oregon duck to win an Indoor 800m championship.
