= Bernard Nganga =

Kenyan steeplechase runner

Personal information
- Nationality: Kenyan
- Born: January 17, 1985 (age 41)
- Home town: Northern Rift Valley, Kenya
- Height: 178 cm (5 ft 10 in)
- Weight: 59 kg (130 lb)

Signature
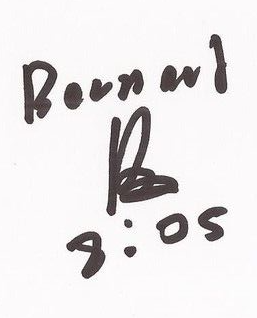

Sport
- Sport: Athletics
- Event: 3000 metres steeplechase

Achievements and titles
- Personal bests: 3000m SC: 8:05.88 (2011); 1500m: 3:40.29 (2013)

Bernard Mbuga Nganga (born 17 January 1985) is a Kenyan 3000 metre steeplechase runner and pacemaker for the Diamond League. He was the winner of the 2015 Seiko Golden Grand Prix in the steeplechase.

== Biography ==
Nganga competed in an era of Kenyan dominance in the steeplechase, which made it difficult for him to make World and Olympic teams.

Nganga's first major competition outside of Africa was at the 2009 Ostrava Golden Spike meet, where he got 10th place in the steeplechase with an 8:22 personal best.

His most notable win was at the 2015 Golden Grand Prix, where he led a Kenyan sweep of top three positions.

From 2014 to 2019, Nganga was a pacemaker for major athletics meetings including those from the Diamond League.

== Statistics ==
=== Personal bests ===
Event	Mark	Competition	Venue	Date
3000 metres steeplechase	8:05.88	ISTAF Berlin	Berlin, Germany	11 September 2011
