= 2007 European Athletics U23 Championships – Women's high jump =

The women's high jump event at the 2007 European Athletics U23 Championships was held in Debrecen, Hungary, at Gyulai István Atlétikai Stadion on 12 and 14 July.

== Medalists ==
Gold	Svetlana Shkolina; Russia
Silver	Adonia Steryiou; Greece
Bronze	Ebba Jungmark; Sweden

== Results ==
=== Final ===
14 July

Rank	Name	Nationality	Attempts								Result	Notes
Rank	Name	Nationality	1.70	1.74	1.78	1.82	1.86	1.89	1.92	1.95	Result	Notes
1st place, gold medalist(s)	Svetlana Shkolina	Russia	–	–	xo	o	o	o	o	xxx	1.92	
2nd place, silver medalist(s)	Adonia Steryiou	Greece	–	o	–	o	o	xo	xxo	xxx	1.92	
3rd place, bronze medalist(s)	Ebba Jungmark	Sweden	–	–	o	o	o	xxo	xxx		1.89	
4	Kamila Stepaniuk	Poland	–	o	o	o	o	xxx			1.86	
5	Stine Kufaas	Norway	–	o	o	o	xo	xxx			1.86	
6	Karina Vnukova	Lithuania	o	o	o	xxo	xxo	xxx			1.86	
7	Gema Martín-Pozuelo	Spain	o	o	xo	xxo	xxo	xxx			1.86	
8	Iryna Kovalenko	Ukraine	–	–	o	o	xxx				1.82	
9	Sharon Heveran	Ireland	o	o	xo	xo	xxx				1.82	
9	Justyna Kasprzycka	Poland	–	xo	o	xo	xxx				1.82	
11	Øyunn Grindem Mogstad	Norway	o	o	o	xxx					1.78	
	Alena Ivanova	Belarus	–	o	o	xxo	xxo	xxo	xxx		DQ	IAAF Rule 32.2.a Doping^{†}

^{†}: Alena Ivanova ranked initially 4th (1.89m), but was disqualified later for infringement of IAAF doping rules.

=== Qualifications ===
12 July
Qualifying 1.85 or 12 best to the Final

==== Group A ====
Rank	Name	Nationality	Result	Notes
1	Svetlana Shkolina	Russia	1.85	Q
2	Stine Kufaas	Norway	1.85	Q
2	Justyna Kasprzycka	Poland	1.85	Q
4	Ebba Jungmark	Sweden	1.85	Q
5	Sharon Heveran	Ireland	1.81	q
6	Anna Iljuštšenko	Estonia	1.81	
6	Viktoria Leks	Estonia	1.81	
8	Marion Parmentier	France	1.81	
9	Stephanie Pywell	United Kingdom	1.77	
10	Lara Kronauer	Switzerland	1.77	
11	Ma'ayan Foreman	Israel	1.73	

==== Group B ====
Rank	Name	Nationality	Result	Notes
1	Iryna Kovalenko	Ukraine	1.85	Q
2	Kamila Stepaniuk	Poland	1.85	Q
3	Øyunn Grindem Mogstad	Norway	1.81	q
3	Gema Martín-Pozuelo	Spain	1.81	q
3	Adonia Steryiou	Greece	1.81	q
3	Karina Vnukova	Lithuania	1.81	q
7	Iveta Srnková	Slovakia	1.81	
7	Annett Engel	Germany	1.81	
9	Xenia Kostrykina	Estonia	1.77	
	Alena Ivanova	Belarus	DQ	q^{†} Doping

^{†}: Alena Ivanova initially reached the final (1.81m), but was disqualified later for infringement of IAAF doping rules.

== Participation ==
According to an unofficial count, 21 athletes from 17 countries participated in the event.

- Belarus (1)
- Estonia (3)
- France (1)
- Germany (1)
- Greece (1)
- Ireland (1)
- Israel (1)
- Lithuania (1)
- Norway (2)
- Poland (2)
- Russia (1)
- Slovakia (1)
- Spain (1)
- Sweden (1)
- Switzerland (1)
- Ukraine (1)
- United Kingdom (1)
