= 2012 Bislett Games =

- Dates: 7 June 2012
- Host city: Oslo, Norway
- Venue: Bislett Stadium
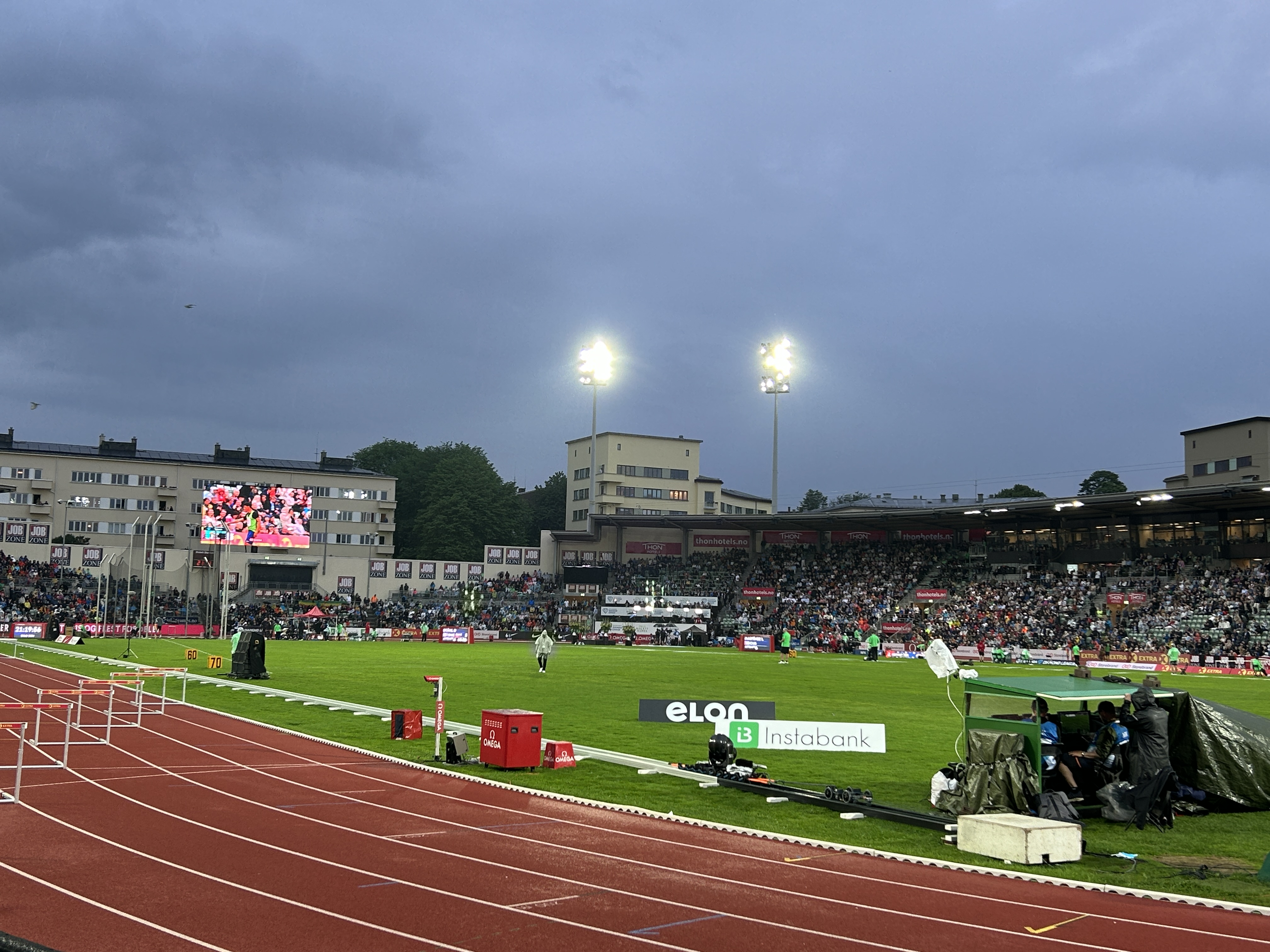
- Level: 2012 Diamond League

The 2012 Bislett Games was the 48th edition of the annual outdoor track and field meeting in Oslo, Norway. Held on 7 June at Bislett Stadium, it was the fourth leg of the 2012 Diamond League – the highest level international track and field circuit.

== Diamond discipline results ==
Podium finishers earned points towards a season leaderboard (4-2-1 respectively), points per event were then doubled in the Diamond League Finals. Athletes had to take part in the Diamond race during the finals to be eligible to win the Diamond trophy which is awarded to the athlete with the most points at the end of the season.

=== Men's ===
100 metres
| Rank | Athlete | Nation | Time | Points | Notes |
|---|---|---|---|---|---|
| 1st place, gold medalist(s) | Usain Bolt | Jamaica | 9.79 | 4 | MR |
| 2nd place, silver medalist(s) | Asafa Powell | Jamaica | 9.85 | 2 | SB |
| 3rd place, bronze medalist(s) | Lerone Clarke | Jamaica | 10.10 | 1 | |
| 4 | Justyn Warner | Canada | 10.20 | | SB |
| 5 | Simon Magakwe | South Africa | 10.30 | | |
| 6 | Marlon Devonish | Great Britain | 10.40 | | |
| 7 | Fabio Cerutti | Italy | 10.52 | | |
| — | Mark Lewis-Francis | Great Britain | DQ | | R 162.7 |
| | | | Wind: (+0.6 m/s) | | |

Mile
| Rank | Athlete | Nation | Time | Points | Notes |
|---|---|---|---|---|---|
| 1st place, gold medalist(s) | Asbel Kiprop | Kenya | 3:49.22 | 4 | WL |
| 2nd place, silver medalist(s) | Caleb Ndiku | Kenya | 3:50.00 | 2 | SB |
| 3rd place, bronze medalist(s) | Mekonnen Gebremedhin | Ethiopia | 3:50.02 | 1 | SB |
| 4 | Gideon Gathimba | Kenya | 3:50.24 | | PB |
| 5 | Amine Laâlou | Morocco | 3:50.43 | | SB |
| 6 | James Kiplagat Magut | Kenya | 3:50.68 | | PB |
| 7 | Bethwell Birgen | Kenya | 3:50.73 | | |
| 8 | Hamza Driouch | Qatar | 3:50.90 | | |
| 9 | Aman Wote | Ethiopia | 3:53.02 | | PB |
| 10 | Ryan Gregson | Australia | 3:53.62 | | |
| 11 | Daniel Kipchirchir Komen | Kenya | 3:53.90 | | |
| 12 | Henrik Ingebrigtsen | Norway | 3:57.35 | | PB |
| — | Ismael Kombich | Kenya | DNF | | PM |
| — | Andrew Kiptoo Rotich | Kenya | DNF | | PM |

5000 metres
| Rank | Athlete | Nation | Time | Points | Notes |
|---|---|---|---|---|---|
| 1st place, gold medalist(s) | Dejen Gebremeskel | Ethiopia | 12:58.92 | 4 | |
| 2nd place, silver medalist(s) | Hagos Gebrhiwet | Ethiopia | 12:58.99 | 2 | PB |
| 3rd place, bronze medalist(s) | Imane Merga | Ethiopia | 12:59.77 | 1 | |
| 4 | Tariku Bekele | Ethiopia | 13:00.41 | | |
| 5 | Kenenisa Bekele | Ethiopia | 13:00.54 | | SB |
| 6 | Moses Ndiema Kipsiro | Uganda | 13:00.68 | | |
| 7 | Sileshi Sihine | Ethiopia | 13:01.39 | | |
| 8 | Yigrem Demelash | Ethiopia | 13:03.30 | | |
| 9 | Yenew Alamirew | Ethiopia | 13:08.12 | | |
| 10 | Yitayal Atnafu Zerihun | Ethiopia | 13:08.13 | | PB |
| 11 | Emmanuel Bett | Kenya | 13:08.35 | | |
| 12 | Abera Kuma | Ethiopia | 13:09.32 | | |
| 13 | Lucas Rotich | Kenya | 13:09.58 | | |
| 14 | Arne Gabius | Germany | 13:13.43 | | PB |
| 15 | Teklemariam Medhin | Eritrea | 13:17.25 | | |
| 16 | Adrian Blincoe | New Zealand | 13:26.43 | | |
| 17 | James Kwalia | Qatar | 13:31.63 | | |
| 18 | Elroy Gelant | South Africa | 13:32.21 | | |
| 19 | Sindre Buraas | Norway | 13:39.81 | | |
| — | Vincent Kipsang Rono | Kenya | DNF | | PM |
| — | Remmy Limo Ndiwa | Kenya | DNF | | PM |

400 metres hurdles
| Rank | Athlete | Nation | Time | Points | Notes |
|---|---|---|---|---|---|
| 1st place, gold medalist(s) | Javier Culson | Puerto Rico | 47.92 | 4 | WL |
| 2nd place, silver medalist(s) | Jehue Gordon | Trinidad and Tobago | 48.78 | 2 | SB |
| 3rd place, bronze medalist(s) | Justin Gaymon | United States | 48.97 | 1 | SB |
| 4 | Dai Greene | Great Britain | 48.98 | | SB |
| 5 | Cornel Fredericks | South Africa | 49.16 | | |
| 6 | Jack Green | Great Britain | 49.70 | | |
| 7 | Richard Yates | Great Britain | 50.46 | | |
| 8 | Georg Fleischhauer | Germany | 50.55 | | SB |

Pole vault
| Rank | Athlete | Nation | Height | Points | Notes |
|---|---|---|---|---|---|
| 1st place, gold medalist(s) | Renaud Lavillenie | France | 5.82 m | 4 | |
| 2nd place, silver medalist(s) | Malte Mohr | Germany | 5.62 m | 2 | |
| 3rd place, bronze medalist(s) | Łukasz Michalski | Poland | 5.52 m | 1 | |
| 4 | Lázaro Borges | Cuba | 5.52 m | | |
| 5 | Alhaji Jeng | Sweden | 5.42 m | | |
| 6 | Björn Otto | Germany | 5.42 m | | |
| 7 | Jérôme Clavier | France | 5.42 m | | |
| — | Fábio Gomes | Brazil | NM | | |
| — | Maksym Mazuryk | Ukraine | NM | | |
| — | Paweł Wojciechowski | Poland | NM | | |

Triple jump
| Rank | Athlete | Nation | Distance | Points | Notes |
|---|---|---|---|---|---|
| 1st place, gold medalist(s) | Lyukman Adams | Russia | 17.09 m (−0.6 m/s) | 4 | |
| 2nd place, silver medalist(s) | Christian Taylor | United States | 17.06 m (+1.2 m/s) | 2 | |
| 3rd place, bronze medalist(s) | Şeref Osmanoğlu | Ukraine | 17.03 m (+0.9 m/s) | 1 | |
| 4 | Benjamin Compaoré | France | 16.90 m (+1.6 m/s) | | |
| 5 | Peder Pawel Nielsen | Denmark | 16.88 m (+2.2 m/s) | | |
| 6 | Alexis Copello | Cuba | 16.70 m (+0.8 m/s) | | |
| 7 | Osviel Hernández | Cuba | 16.35 m (+0.8 m/s) | | |
| 8 | Larry Achike | Great Britain | 16.12 m (+1.7 m/s) | | |
Best wind-legal performances
| | Peder Pawel Nielsen | Denmark | 16.56 m (+1.3 m/s) | | |

Shot put
| Rank | Athlete | Nation | Distance | Points | Notes |
|---|---|---|---|---|---|
| 1st place, gold medalist(s) | Tomasz Majewski | Poland | 21.36 m | 4 | |
| 2nd place, silver medalist(s) | Dylan Armstrong | Canada | 20.82 m | 2 | |
| 3rd place, bronze medalist(s) | David Storl | Germany | 20.69 m | 1 | |
| 4 | Kim Christensen | Denmark | 19.69 m | | |
| 5 | Marco Fortes | Portugal | 19.56 m | | |
| 6 | Óðinn Björn Þorsteinsson | Iceland | 18.66 m | | |
| 7 | Leif Arrhenius | Sweden | 18.61 m | | SB |
| 8 | Stian Andersen | Norway | 16.47 m | | SB |

Javelin throw
| Rank | Athlete | Nation | Distance | Points | Notes |
|---|---|---|---|---|---|
| 1st place, gold medalist(s) | Vítězslav Veselý | Czech Republic | 88.11 m | 4 | WL |
| 2nd place, silver medalist(s) | Fatih Avan | Turkey | 83.82 m | 2 | |
| 3rd place, bronze medalist(s) | Andreas Thorkildsen | Norway | 82.30 m | 1 | |
| 4 | Ari Mannio | Finland | 82.20 m | | |
| 5 | Matthias de Zordo | Germany | 81.44 m | | |
| 6 | Vadims Vasiļevskis | Latvia | 80.96 m | | |
| 7 | Stuart Farquhar | New Zealand | 78.84 m | | |
| 8 | Ivan Zaytsev | Uzbekistan | 77.81 m | | |
| 9 | Tero Pitkämäki | Finland | 73.57 m | | |

=== Women's ===
200 metres
| Rank | Athlete | Nation | Time | Points | Notes |
|---|---|---|---|---|---|
| 1st place, gold medalist(s) | Murielle Ahouré-Demps | Ivory Coast | 22.42 | 4 | NR |
| 2nd place, silver medalist(s) | Abi Oyepitan | Great Britain | 22.71 | 2 | SB |
| 3rd place, bronze medalist(s) | Charonda Williams | United States | 22.75 | 1 | |
| 4 | Mariya Ryemyen | Ukraine | 22.78 | | |
| 5 | Sheri-Ann Brooks | Jamaica | 23.16 | | SB |
| 6 | Kerron Stewart | Jamaica | 23.19 | | |
| 7 | Sherone Simpson | Jamaica | 23.32 | | |
| 8 | Folake Akinyemi | Norway | 23.83 | | |
| | | | Wind: (+1.5 m/s) | | |

400 metres
| Rank | Athlete | Nation | Time | Points | Notes |
|---|---|---|---|---|---|
| 1st place, gold medalist(s) | Amantle Montsho | Botswana | 49.68 | 4 | |
| 2nd place, silver medalist(s) | Patricia Hall | Jamaica | 50.71 | 2 | PB |
| 3rd place, bronze medalist(s) | Debbie Dunn | United States | 51.22 | 1 | SB |
| 4 | Natalya Antyukh | Russia | 51.51 | | |
| 5 | Shericka Williams | Jamaica | 51.56 | | |
| 6 | Moa Hjelmer | Sweden | 51.99 | | |
| 7 | Marie Gayot | France | 52.47 | | |
| 8 | Nicola Sanders | Great Britain | 52.79 | | |

1500 metres
| Rank | Athlete | Nation | Time | Points | Notes |
|---|---|---|---|---|---|
| 1st place, gold medalist(s) | Abeba Aregawi | Ethiopia | 4:02.42 | 4 | |
| 2nd place, silver medalist(s) | Genzebe Dibaba | Ethiopia | 4:03.28 | 2 | |
| 3rd place, bronze medalist(s) | Anna Mishchenko | Ukraine | 4:03.33 | 1 | SB |
| 4 | Hellen Obiri | Kenya | 4:04.42 | | |
| 5 | Btissam Lakhouad | Morocco | 4:04.45 | | |
| 6 | Morgan Uceny | United States | 4:05.30 | | |
| 7 | Ingvill Måkestad Bovim | Norway | 4:06.31 | | |
| 8 | Anna Willard | United States | 4:06.91 | | |
| 9 | Stephanie Twell | Great Britain | 4:07.49 | | SB |
| 10 | Renata Pliś | Poland | 4:07.87 | | |
| 11 | Lucia Hrivnák Klocová | Slovakia | 4:07.99 | | NR |
| 12 | Nuria Fernández | Spain | 4:08.82 | | |
| — | Anna Luchkina | Russia | DNF | | PM |

100 metres hurdles - Heats
Heat 1
| Rank | Athlete | Nation | Time | Notes |
|---|---|---|---|---|
| 1 | Sally Pearson | Australia | 12.59 | Q |
| 2 | Kristi Castlin | United States | 12.74 | Q |
| 3 | Jessica Ennis-Hill | Great Britain | 12.83 | Q |
| 4 | Lolo Jones | United States | 13.04 | Q |
| 5 | Nooralotta Neziri | Finland | 13.31 | |
| 6 | Isabelle Pedersen | Norway | 13.59 | |
| 7 | Caroline Lundahl | Sweden | 13.95 | |
| — | Phylicia George | Canada | DQ | R 162.7 |
| | | | Wind: (+0.4 m/s) | |
Heat 2
| 1 | Tiffany Porter | Great Britain | 12.75 | Q |
| 2 | Danielle Carruthers | United States | 12.81 | Q, SB |
| 3 | Priscilla Lopes-Schliep | Canada | 12.97 | Q |
| 4 | Lisa Urech | Switzerland | 13.14 | Q |
| 5 | Christina Vukicevic | Norway | 13.18 | SB |
| 6 | Eline Berings | Belgium | 13.20 | |
| 7 | Andrea Hams | New Zealand | 13.25 | |
| 8 | Ida Bakke Hansen | Norway | 14.19 | |
| | | | Wind: (−0.3 m/s) | |

100 metres hurdles - Final
| Rank | Athlete | Nation | Time | Notes |
|---|---|---|---|---|
| 1st place, gold medalist(s) | Sally Pearson | Australia | 12.49 | MR, =WL |
| 2nd place, silver medalist(s) | Kristi Castlin | United States | 12.56 | PB |
| 3rd place, bronze medalist(s) | Tiffany Porter | Great Britain | 12.70 | |
| 4 | Priscilla Lopes-Schliep | Canada | 12.74 | |
| 5 | Lolo Jones | United States | 12.75 | SB |
| 6 | Danielle Carruthers | United States | 12.76 | SB |
| 7 | Lisa Urech | Switzerland | 13.15 | |
| — | Jessica Ennis-Hill | Great Britain | DQ | R 162.7 |
| | | | Wind: (+0.7 m/s) | |

3000 metres steeplechase
| Rank | Athlete | Nation | Time | Points | Notes |
|---|---|---|---|---|---|
| 1st place, gold medalist(s) | Milcah Chemos Cheywa | Kenya | 9:07.14 | 4 | AR, MR |
| 2nd place, silver medalist(s) | Sofia Assefa | Ethiopia | 9:09.00 | 2 | NR |
| 3rd place, bronze medalist(s) | Hiwot Ayalew | Ethiopia | 9:09.61 | 1 | PB |
| 4 | Mercy Wanjiku | Kenya | 9:25.21 | | SB |
| 5 | Lydiah Chepkurui | Kenya | 9:27.40 | | PM |
| 6 | Gesa Felicitas Krause | Germany | 9:33.10 | | SB |
| 7 | Lydia Rotich | Kenya | 9:33.19 | | |
| 8 | Birtukan Adamu | Ethiopia | 9:36.40 | | SB |
| 9 | Eilish McColgan | Great Britain | 9:38.45 | | PB |
| 10 | Mekdes Bekele | Ethiopia | 9:39.09 | | |
| 11 | Helen Hofstede | Netherlands | 10:21.29 | | |

High jump
| Rank | Athlete | Nation | Height | Points | Notes |
|---|---|---|---|---|---|
| 1st place, gold medalist(s) | Chaunté Lowe | United States | 1.97 m | 4 | |
| 2nd place, silver medalist(s) | Tia Hellebaut | Belgium | 1.93 m | 2 | |
| 3rd place, bronze medalist(s) | Marina Aitova | Kazakhstan | 1.90 m | 1 | SB |
| 4 | Ruth Beitia | Spain | 1.90 m | | |
| 4 | Anna Iljuštšenko | Estonia | 1.90 m | | =SB |
| 6 | Øyunn Grindem Mogstad | Norway | 1.85 m | | SB |
| 7 | Tonje Angelsen | Norway | 1.85 m | | |
| 8 | Stine Kufaas | Norway | 1.80 m | | |

Long jump
| Rank | Athlete | Nation | Distance | Points | Notes |
|---|---|---|---|---|---|
| 1st place, gold medalist(s) | ~~Olga Kucherenko~~ | ~~Russia~~ | ~~6.96 m (+2.6 m/s)~~ | 4 | DQ (Note: Due to doping violations Kucherenko's results from this competition were disqualified.) |
| 2nd place, silver medalist(s) | Yelena Sokolova | Russia | 6.89 m (+2.6 m/s) | 2 | |
| 3rd place, bronze medalist(s) | Janay DeLoach Soukup | United States | 6.78 m (+0.8 m/s) | 1 | |
| 4 | Shara Proctor | Great Britain | 6.60 m (−0.3 m/s) | | |
| 5 | Ivana Španović | Serbia | 6.48 m (+2.0 m/s) | | SB |
| 6 | Ineta Radēviča | Latvia | 6.46 m (+2.7 m/s) | | |
| 7 | Olga Zaytseva | Russia | 6.07 m (+0.9 m/s) | | SB |
| — | Margrethe Renstrøm | Norway | NM | | |
Best wind-legal performances
| | ~~Olga Kucherenko~~ | ~~Russia~~ | ~~6.40 m (+0.1 m/s)~~ | | |
| | Ineta Radēviča | Latvia | 6.41 m (+1.5 m/s) | | |
| | Yelena Sokolova | Russia | 6.86 m (+0.7 m/s) | | |

Discus throw
| Rank | Athlete | Nation | Distance | Points | Notes |
|---|---|---|---|---|---|
| 1st place, gold medalist(s) | Sandra Elkasević | Croatia | 64.89 m | 4 | |
| 2nd place, silver medalist(s) | Nadine Müller | Germany | 63.60 m | 2 | |
| 3rd place, bronze medalist(s) | Yarelys Barrios | Cuba | 63.57 m | 1 | |
| 4 | Żaneta Glanc | Poland | 63.00 m | | |
| 5 | Natalia Stratulat | Moldova | 58.35 m | | |
| 6 | Nicoleta Grasu | Romania | 56.71 m | | |
| 7 | Monique Jansen | Netherlands | 56.61 m | | |
| 8 | Grete Etholm | Norway | 53.23 m | | |

== Promotional events results ==
=== Women's ===
200 metres
| Rank | Athlete | Nation | Time | Notes |
|---|---|---|---|---|
| 1st place, gold medalist(s) | Ezinne Okparaebo | Norway | 11.31 | |
| 2nd place, silver medalist(s) | Charonda Williams | United States | 11.44 | |
| 3rd place, bronze medalist(s) | Sheri-Ann Brooks | Jamaica | 11.44 | |
| 4 | Gloria Asumnu | Nigeria | 11.44 | |
| 5 | Montell Douglas | Great Britain | 11.55 | SB |
| 6 | Tiffany Townsend | United States | 11.56 | |
| 7 | Abi Oyepitan | Great Britain | 11.70 | |
| | | | Wind: (−1.2 m/s) | |

== National events results ==
=== Men's ===
200 metres
| Rank | Athlete | Nation | Time | Notes |
|---|---|---|---|---|
| 1st place, gold medalist(s) | Nil de Oliveira | Sweden | 21.10 | SB |
| 2nd place, silver medalist(s) | Per Magnus Arjun Solli | Norway | 21.62 | SB |
| 3rd place, bronze medalist(s) | Philip Bjørnå Berntsen | Norway | 21.82 | |
| 4 | Simen Sigurdsen | Norway | 21.98 | SB |
| 5 | Christian Settemsli Mogstad | Norway | 22.08 | SB |
| 6 | Tormod Hjortnæs Larsen | Norway | 22.16 | |
| 7 | Thomas Firing | Norway | 22.31 | |
| 8 | Riquelvis Rafael Santiago | Norway | 22.57 | |
| | | | Wind: (−0.8 m/s) | |

400 metres
| Rank | Athlete | Nation | Time | Notes |
|---|---|---|---|---|
| 1st place, gold medalist(s) | Nigel Levine | Great Britain | 45.11 | PB |
| 2nd place, silver medalist(s) | Johan Wissman | Sweden | 46.24 | |
| 3rd place, bronze medalist(s) | Sondre Nyvold Lid | Norway | 47.04 | PB |
| 4 | Andreas Roth | Norway | 47.77 | PB |
| 5 | Håkon Henriksen | Norway | 48.37 | PB |
| 6 | Torbjørn Lysne | Norway | 48.64 | PB |
| 7 | Mauritz Kåshagen | Norway | 49.02 | |
| 8 | Carl Emil Kåshagen | Norway | 49.66 | |

800 metres
| Rank | Athlete | Nation | Time | Notes |
|---|---|---|---|---|
| 1st place, gold medalist(s) | Gareth Warburton | Great Britain | 1:44.98 | PB |
| 2nd place, silver medalist(s) | Guy Learmonth | Great Britain | 1:47.14 | PB |
| 3rd place, bronze medalist(s) | Johan Svensson | Sweden | 1:47.31 | PB |
| 4 | Ådne Svahn Dæhlin | Norway | 1:48.05 | |
| 5 | Thomas Roth | Norway | 1:48.14 | PB |
| 6 | Stian Flo | Norway | 1:50.83 | SB |
| 7 | Filip Ingebrigtsen | Norway | 1:51.09 | SB |
| 8 | Alberto Mamba | Mozambique | 1:51.45 | PB |
| 9 | Vidar Dahle | Norway | 1:51.64 | |
| 10 | Emil Oustad | Norway | 1:52.17 | |
| — | Thomas A. Bydal Jakobsen | Norway | DNF | PM |

1500 metres
| Rank | Athlete | Nation | Time | Notes |
|---|---|---|---|---|
| 1st place, gold medalist(s) | Taoufik Makhloufi | Algeria | 3:33.26 | SB |
| 2nd place, silver medalist(s) | Nacerddine Hallil | Algeria | 3:36.84 | PB |
| 3rd place, bronze medalist(s) | Niclas Sandells | Finland | 3:38.08 | PB |
| 4 | Andreas Vojta | Austria | 3:38.09 | |
| 5 | Dmitrijs Jurkevičs | Latvia | 3:38.68 | SB |
| 6 | Thomas Solberg Eide | Norway | 3:42.68 | |
| 7 | David Bishop | Great Britain | 3:42.80 | |
| 8 | Hans Kristian Fløystad | Norway | 3:43.21 | SB |
| 9 | Mikael Bergdahl | Finland | 3:43.39 | SB |
| 10 | Tom Farrell | Great Britain | 3:43.45 | |
| 11 | Johannes Alnes | Norway | 3:45.42 | |
| 12 | Johan Hydén | Sweden | 3:45.82 | SB |
| 13 | Ferdinand Kvan Edman | Norway | 3:45.84 | PB |
| 14 | Vetle Aasland | Norway | 3:48.28 | |
| 15 | Kjetil Måkestad | Norway | 3:49.28 | =SB |
| 16 | Erik Udø Pedersen | Norway | 3:49.44 | |
| 17 | Morten Velde | Norway | 3:49.81 | |
| 18 | Tom Erling Kårbø | Norway | 3:50.84 | |
| 19 | Jørgen Frost Bø | Norway | 3:50.92 | PB |
| — | Vegard Løberg Gjelsvik | Norway | DNF | PM |
| — | Abdirahman Guleed | Norway | DNF | PM |

110 metres hurdles
| Rank | Athlete | Nation | Time | Notes |
|---|---|---|---|---|
| 1st place, gold medalist(s) | Lehann Fourie | South Africa | 13.69 | |
| 2nd place, silver medalist(s) | Adrien Deghelt | Belgium | 13.73 | |
| 3rd place, bronze medalist(s) | Vladimir Vukicevic | Norway | 13.88 | |
| 4 | Matthew Hudson | Great Britain | 13.98 | |
| 5 | Eivind Johan Stavang | Norway | 14.40 | SB |
| 6 | Andreas Martinsen | Denmark | 14.41 | |
| 7 | Jon Yde Bentsen | Denmark | 14.84 | |
| 8 | Hans Olav Uldal | Norway | 14.85 | |
| | | | Wind: (+1.0 m/s) | |

400 metres hurdles
| Rank | Athlete | Nation | Time | Notes |
|---|---|---|---|---|
| 1st place, gold medalist(s) | Øyvind Strømmen Kjerpeset | Norway | 51.19 | SB |
| 2nd place, silver medalist(s) | Marius Bakken Støle | Norway | 52.09 | PB |
| 3rd place, bronze medalist(s) | Markus Loftås | Norway | 53.29 | SB |

=== Women's ===
400 metres
| Rank | Athlete | Nation | Time | Notes |
|---|---|---|---|---|
| 1st place, gold medalist(s) | Line Kloster | Norway | 54.27 | |
| 2nd place, silver medalist(s) | Tara Marie Norum | Norway | 54.86 | PB |
| 3rd place, bronze medalist(s) | Nina Katrine Brandt | Norway | 55.09 | SB |
| 4 | Irene Høvik Helgesen | Norway | 55.10 | SB |
| 5 | Benedicte Hauge | Norway | 55.35 | SB |
| 6 | Julie Andrea Håskjold | Norway | 55.77 | PB |
| 7 | Yngvild Elvemo | Norway | 56.02 | PB |

1500 metres
| Rank | Athlete | Nation | Time | Notes |
|---|---|---|---|---|
| 1st place, gold medalist(s) | Meraf Bahta | Eritrea | 4:22.55 | SB |
| 2nd place, silver medalist(s) | Frida Berge | Norway | 4:23.09 | PB |
| 3rd place, bronze medalist(s) | Ingeborg Kristine Lind | Norway | 4:24.75 | PB |
| 4 | Aurora Dybedokken | Norway | 4:29.56 | PB |
| 5 | Karoline Egeland Skatteboe | Norway | 4:31.42 | PB |
| 6 | Hilde Aasheim | Norway | 4:32.19 | PB |
| 7 | Thea Krokan Murud | Norway | 4:36.68 | |
| 8 | Trine Mjåland | Norway | 4:38.19 | PM |
| 9 | Christina Bus Holth | Norway | 4:38.88 | |

400 metres hurdles
| Rank | Athlete | Nation | Time | Notes |
|---|---|---|---|---|
| 1st place, gold medalist(s) | Jessie Barr | Ireland | 56.73 | |
| 2nd place, silver medalist(s) | Stine Meland Tomb | Norway | 57.78 | PB |
| 3rd place, bronze medalist(s) | Emma Millard | Finland | 58.55 | SB |
| 4 | Ilona Punkkinen | Finland | 58.67 | SB |
| 5 | Vilde Svortevik | Norway | 1:00.66 | |
| 6 | Hege Vold | Norway | 1:01.59 | |

== See also ==
- 2012 Diamond League
