= Athletics at the 2006 Commonwealth Games – Women's high jump =

Women's high jump at the Commonwealth Games

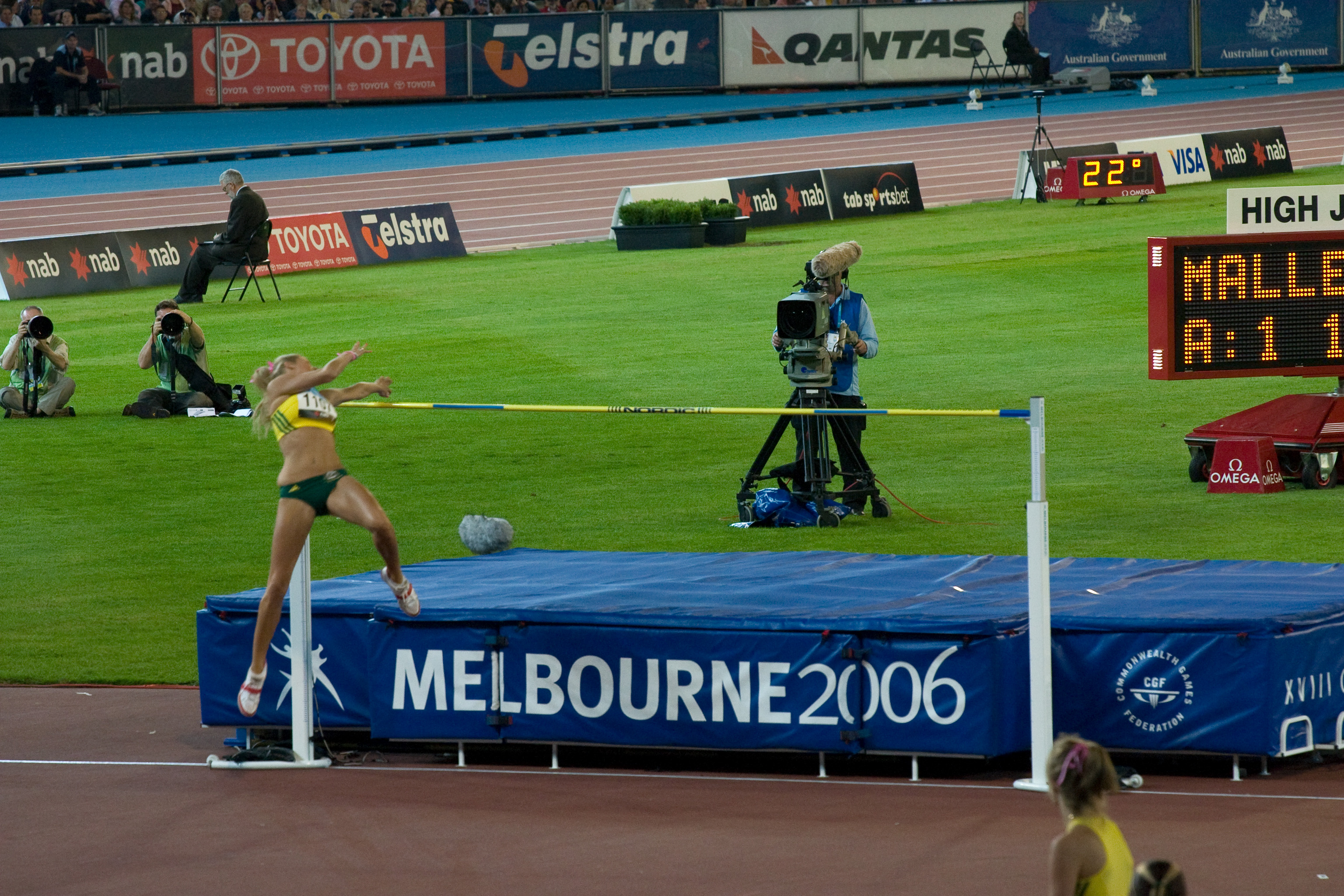
Australian Claire Mallett during the high jump competition

The women's high jump event at the 2006 Commonwealth Games was held on March 23.

== Results ==
Rank	Athlete	Nationality	1.73	1.78	1.83	1.88	1.91	1.94	Result
1st place, gold medalist(s)	Anika Smit	South Africa	–	xo	o	o	xo	xxx	1.91
2nd place, silver medalist(s)	Julie Crane	Wales	–	o	o	xxo	xxx		1.88
3rd place, bronze medalist(s)	Karen Beautle	Jamaica	o	o	o	xxx			1.83
3rd place, bronze medalist(s)	Angela McKee	New Zealand	o	o	o	xxx			1.83
5	Lavern Spencer	Saint Lucia	–	x–	o	xxx			1.83
6	Claire Mallett	Australia	o	o	xo	xxx			1.83
6	Susan Moncrieff	England	–	o	xo	xxx			1.83
6	Ellen Pettitt	Australia	o	o	xo	xxx			1.83
9	Julia Bennett	England	o	o	xxx				1.78
9	Petrina Price	Australia	o	o	xxx				1.78
9	Zindzi Swan	Bermuda	o	o	xxx				1.78
12	Latroya Darrell	Bermuda	xo	xo	xxx				1.78
	Nicole Forrester	Canada	–	–	xxx			NM	

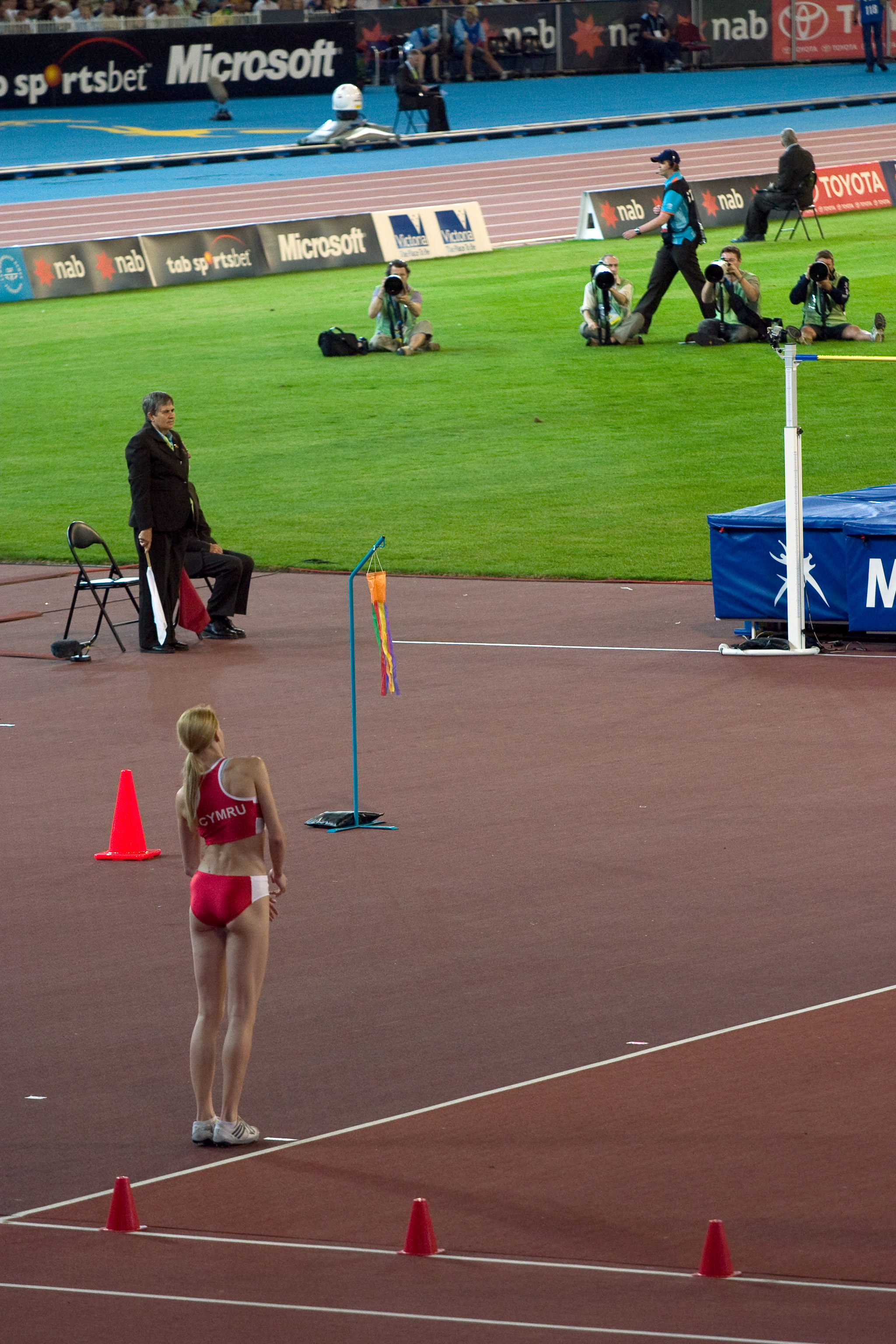
Julie Crane of Wales preparing to jump at 2006 Commonwealth Games high jump event
