= 2012 European Athletics Championships – Women's high jump =

Women's high jump at the European Athletics Championships

The women's high jump at the 2012 European Athletics Championships was held at the Helsinki Olympic Stadium on 27 and 28 June.

== Medalists ==
Gold	Ruth Beitia; Spain
Silver	Tonje Angelsen; Norway
Bronze	Irina Gordeeva; Russia
Bronze	Emma Green Tregaro; Sweden
Bronze	Olena Holosha; Ukraine

== Records ==
Standing records prior to the 2012 European Athletics Championships
World record	Stefka Kostadinova (BUL)	2.09	Rome, Italy	30 August 1987
European record	Stefka Kostadinova (BUL)	2.09	Rome, Italy	30 August 1987
Championship record	Tia Hellebaut (BEL)	2.03	Gothenburg, Sweden	11 August 2006
Championship record	Venelina Veneva (BUL)	2.03	Gothenburg, Sweden	11 August 2006
Championship record	Blanka Vlašić (CRO)	2.03	Barcelona, Spain	1 August 2010
World Leading	Anna Chicherova (RUS)	2.02	Eugene, United States	2 June 2012
European Leading	Anna Chicherova (RUS)	2.02	Eugene, United States	2 June 2012

== Schedule ==
Date	Time	Round
27 June 2012	10:15	Qualification
28 June 2012	17:45	Final

== Results ==
=== Qualification ===
Qualification: Qualification Performance 1.92 (Q) or at least 12 best performers advance to the final

Rank	Group	Athlete	Nationality	1.68	1.73	1.78	1.83	1.87	1.90	Result	Notes
1	B	Burcu Ayhan	Turkey	–	–	o	o	o	o	1.90	q
1	B	Ruth Beitia	Spain	–	–	–	o	o	o	1.90	q
1	B	Mirela Demireva	Bulgaria	–	–	o	o	o	o	1.90	q
1	A	Irina Gordeeva	Russia	–	–	o	o	o	o	1.90	q
1	A	Emma Green Tregaro	Sweden	–	–	–	o	o	o	1.90	q
1	A	Olena Holosha	Ukraine	–	–	o	o	o	o	1.90	q
7	B	Melanie Melfort	France	–	–	o	o	xo	o	1.90	q
8	B	Tonje Angelsen	Norway	–	–	–	xo	o	xo	1.90	q
9	B	Airinė Palšytė	Lithuania	–	–	o	o	o	xxo	1.90	q, SB
9	A	Venelina Veneva-Mateeva	Bulgaria	–	–	o	o	o	xxo	1.90	q
11	B	Ebba Jungmark	Sweden	–	–	–	o	xo	xxo	1.90	q
12	B	Antonia Stergiou	Greece	–	o	o	o	o	xxx	1.87	q
13	A	Øyunn Grindem Mogstad	Norway	–	–	o	o	xo	xxx	1.87	SB
13	B	Anna Iljuštšenko	Estonia	–	–	–	o	xo	xxx	1.87	
13	A	Marie-Laurence Jungfleisch	Germany	–	–	o	o	xo	xxx	1.87	
13	A	Austra Skujytė	Lithuania	–	o	o	o	xo	xxx	1.87	
17	A	Oldřiška Marešová	Czech Republic	–	–	o	o	xxx		1.83	
18	A	Eleriin Haas	Estonia	o	o	xo	o	xxx		1.83	PB
18	A	Izabela Mikołajczyk	Poland	–	–	xo	o	xx–	x	1.83	
20	A	Ana Šimić	Croatia	–	–	xxo	xxo	xxx		1.83	
21	A	Isobel Pooley	Great Britain	–	–	o	xxx			1.78	
22	B	Elina Smolander	Finland	–	xo	o	xxx			1.78	
23	B	Monika Gollner	Austria	–	o	xo	xxx			1.78	
24	B	Maayan Furman	Israel	o	o	xxo	xxx			1.78	
	A	Marija Vuković	Montenegro							DNS	
	B	Ariane Friedrich	Germany							DNS	

=== Final ===
Rank	Athlete	Nationality	1.80	1.85	1.89	1.92	1.95	1.97	1.99	Result	Notes
1st place, gold medalist(s)	Ruth Beitia	Spain	-	o	-	o	o	xxo	xxx	1.97	=SB
2nd place, silver medalist(s)	Tonje Angelsen	Norway	o	o	xo	o	o	xxo	xxx	1.97	PB
3rd place, bronze medalist(s)	Irina Gordeeva	Russia	o	o	o	o	xxx			1.92	
3rd place, bronze medalist(s)	Emma Green Tregaro	Sweden	-	o	o	o	xxx			1.92	SB
3rd place, bronze medalist(s)	Olena Holosha	Ukraine	o	o	o	o	xxx			1.92	
6	Burcu Ayhan	Turkey	o	xo	xo	o	xxx			1.92	=SB
6	Melanie Melfort	France	o	o	xxo	o	xxx			1.92	SB
8	Mirela Demireva	Bulgaria	o	o	o	xxo	xxx			1.92	=PB
9	Airinė Palšytė	Lithuania	o	o	xo	xx-	x			1.89	
10	Ebba Jungmark	Sweden	o	o	xxx					1.85	
11	Antonia Stergiou	Greece	o	xxx						1.80	
12	Venelina Veneva-Mateeva	Bulgaria	xo	xxx						1.80	
