= 2018 African Championships in Athletics – Women's high jump =

The women's high jump event at the 2018 African Championships in Athletics was held on 5 August in Asaba, Nigeria.

== Results ==
Rank	Athlete	Nationality	1.60	1.65	1.70	1.75	1.80	1.83	Result	Notes
1st place, gold medalist(s)	Erika Seyama	Eswatini	–	o	o	o	o	xxx	1.80	
2nd place, silver medalist(s)	Hoda Hagras	Egypt	–	o	o	x–	xo	xxx	1.80	
3rd place, bronze medalist(s)	Ariyat Dibow	Ethiopia	–	xo	o	xo	xo	xxx	1.80	
4	Abigail Kwarteng	Ghana	o	o	xo	o	xxo	xxx	1.80	
5	Ghizlane Siba	Morocco	–	o	o	xo	xxo	xxx	1.80	
6	Julia du Plessis	South Africa	–	o	o	o	xxx		1.75	
6	Fatima Zahra El Alaoui	Morocco	–	o	o	o	xxx		1.75	
8	Yvonne Robson	South Africa	o	o	o	xo	xxx		1.75	
9	Riham Abohiba	Egypt	–	o	xo	xxo	xxx		1.75	
10	Esther Isa	Nigeria	o	o	o	xxx			1.70	
11	Basant Hassan	Egypt	–	o	xo	xxx			1.70	
11	Marlize Higgins	South Africa	o	o	xo	xxx			1.70	
13	Natacha Chetty	Seychelles	xo	xo	xxx				1.65	
14	Moumbagna Fouda	Cameroon	xxo	xxo	xxx				1.65	
	Otricia Borkuah	Liberia	xxx						NM	
