= Athletics at the 1998 Commonwealth Games – Women's high jump =

Women's high jump at the Commonwealth Games

The women's high jump event at the 1998 Commonwealth Games was held on 20 September in Kuala Lumpur.

== Results ==
Rank	Name	Nationality	Result	Notes
1st place, gold medalist(s)	Hestrie Storbeck	South Africa	1.91	
2nd place, silver medalist(s)	Joanne Jennings	England	1.91	PB
3rd place, bronze medalist(s)	Alison Inverarity	Australia	1.88	
4	Michelle Dunkley	England	1.88	PB
4	Lisa Bruty	Australia	1.88	
6	Nicole Forrester	Canada	1.85	
7	Susan Jones	England	1.85	
8	Julie Crane	Wales	1.80	
9	Karen Beautle	Jamaica	1.75	
