= Athletics at the 2002 Commonwealth Games – Women's high jump =

Women's high jump at the Commonwealth Games

The women's high jump event at the 2002 Commonwealth Games was held on 30 July.

== Results ==
Rank	Athlete	Nationality	1.74	1.79	1.84	1.87	1.90	1.93	1.96	2.00	Result	Notes
1st place, gold medalist(s)	Hestrie Cloete	South Africa	–	o	o	o	o	o	o	xxx	1.96	GR
2nd place, silver medalist(s)	Susan Jones	England	–	o	o	xo	xxo	xxx			1.90	
3rd place, bronze medalist(s)	Nicole Forrester	Canada	o	o	o	o	xxx				1.87	
4	Bobby Aloysius	India	o	o	o	xxo	xxx				1.87	
5	Karen Beautle	Jamaica	xo	xo	xo	xxx					1.84	
6	Maresa Cadienhead	Canada	–	o	xxx						1.79	
6	Stephanie Higham	England	o	o	xxx						1.79	
6	Debbie Marti	England	o	o	xxx						1.79	
6	Petrina Price	Australia	o	o	xxx						1.79	
10	Julie Crane	Wales	o	xo	xxx						1.79	
10	Rebecca Jones	Wales	o	xo	xxx						1.79	
12	Lavern Spencer	Saint Lucia	o	xxx							1.74	
12	Julia Farmaka	Cyprus	o	xxx							1.74	
14	Agni Charalambous	Cyprus	xxo	xxx							1.74	
