= Nicole Forrester =

Canadian high jumper

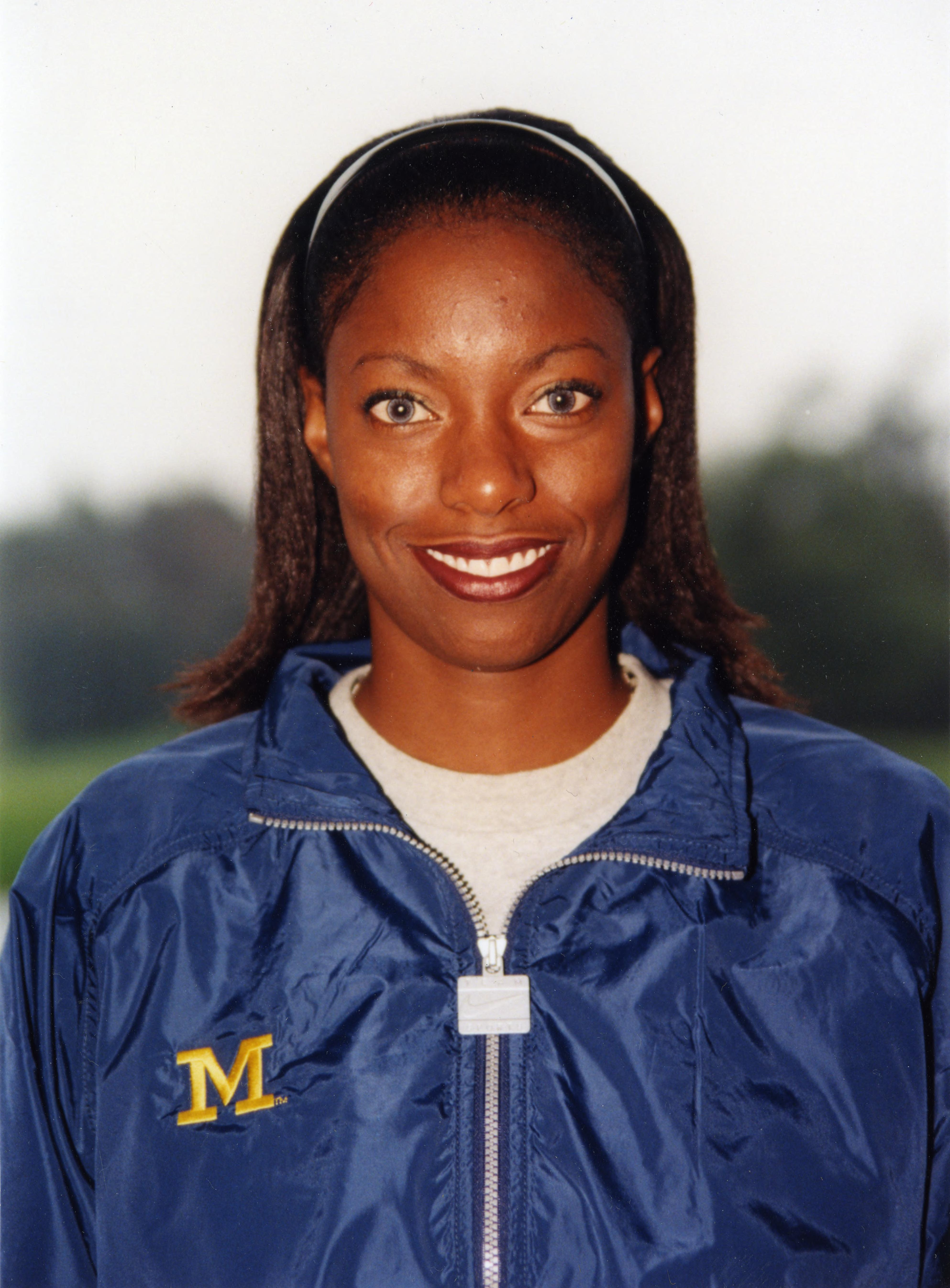
- Forrester in 1999

Personal information
- Born: 17 November 1976 (age 49) Aurora, Ontario, Canada
- Height: 1.92 m (6 ft 4 in)
- Weight: 70 kg (154 lb)

Sport
- Country: Canada
- Sport: Athletics
- Event: High jump
- College team: University of Michigan Wolverines
Medal record
Representing Canada
Commonwealth Games
Gold medal – first place	2010 Delhi	High jump
Bronze medal – third place	2002 Manchester	High jump
Summer Universiade
Silver medal – second place	2001 Beijing	High jump
Pan American Games
Silver medal – second place	2007 Rio de Janeiro	High jump
Bronze medal – third place	1999 Winnipeg	High jump

Nicole Wendy Forrester (born 17 November 1976) is a Canadian high jumper. She was born in Aurora, Ontario. Her personal best jump is 1.97 metres, achieved in July 2007 in Thessaloniki.

== Education and career ==
Forrester completed her Bachelor of Arts in Management and Communication and her Bachelor of Science in Movement Science at the University of Michigan, where she competed for the Michigan Wolverines track and field team. She completed her Masters of Education in Exercise and Sport Psychology from the University of Texas. She completed her PhD in Sports Psychology at Michigan State University with a dissertation titled "Good to great in elite athletes: towards an understanding of why some athletes make the leap and others do not." Forrester is a professor in the RTA School of Media at Toronto Metropolitan University in Toronto, Ontario.

== Competition record ==
Year	Competition	Venue	Position	Notes
Representing Canada
1997	Universiade	Catania, Italy	(q)	1.75 m
1998	Commonwealth Games	Kuala Lumpur, Malaysia	6th	1.85 m
1999	Pan American Games	Winnipeg, Manitoba, Canada	3rd	1.85 m
1999	World Championships	Seville, Spain	32nd (q)	1.80 m
2001	Jeux de la Francophonie	Ottawa, Ontario, Canada	2nd	1.89 m
2001	Universiade	Beijing, China	2nd	1.94 m
2002	Commonwealth Games	Manchester, United Kingdom	3rd	1.87 m
2003	Pan American Games	Santo Domingo, Dominican Republic	7th	1.80 m
2006	Commonwealth Games	Melbourne, Australia	–	NM
2007	Pan American Games	Rio de Janeiro, Brazil	2nd	1.95 m
2008	World Indoor Championships	Valencia, Spain	15th (q)	1.86 m
2008	Olympic Games	Beijing, China	19th (q)	1.89 m
2009	Jeux de la Francophonie	Beirut, Lebanon	3rd	1.80 m
2010	Commonwealth Games	Delhi, India	1st	1.91 m

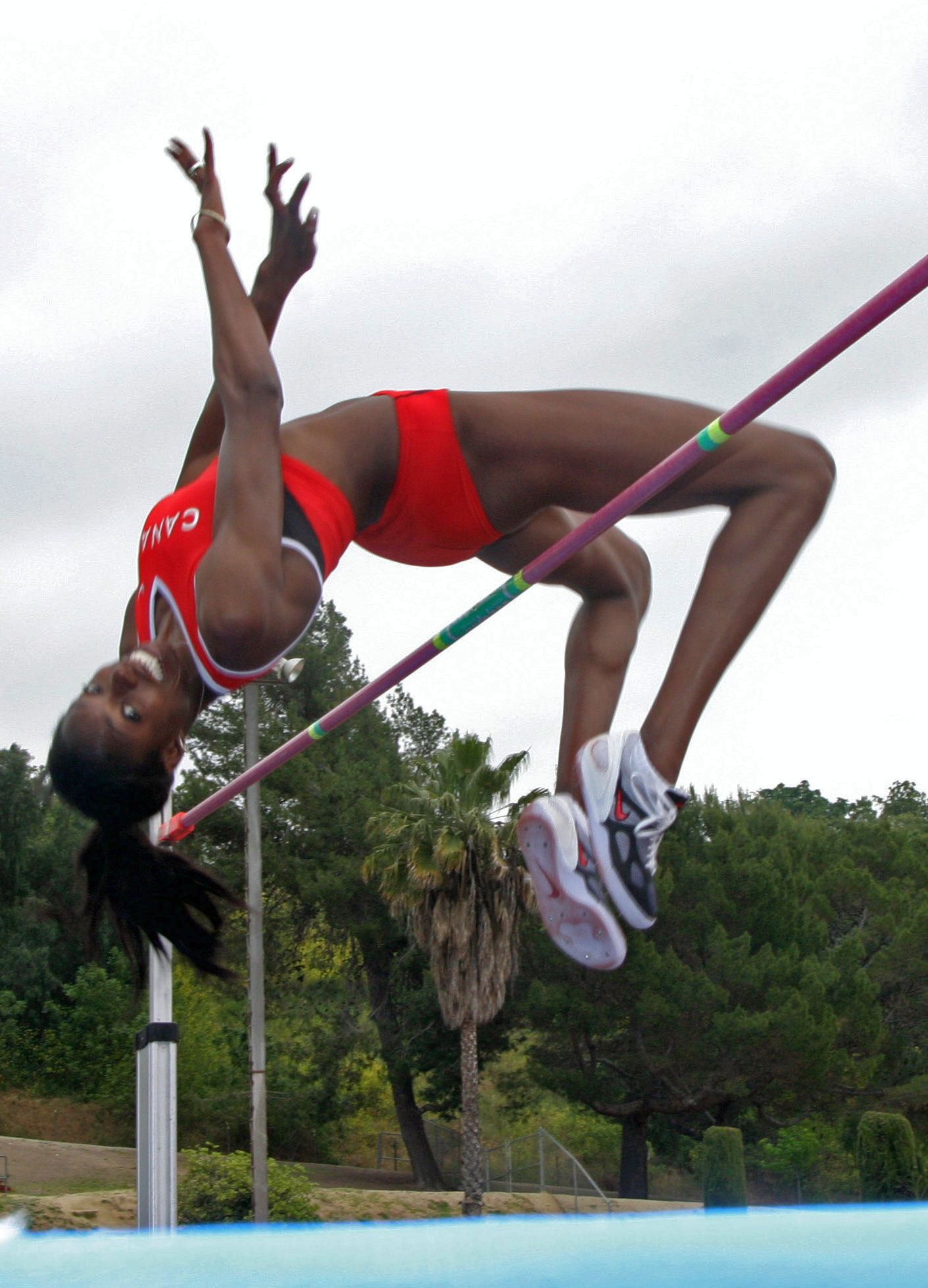
Forrester performing a high jump in 2010
