= 2013 World Youth Championships in Athletics – Girls' high jump =

Girls' high jump at the 2013 World Youth Championships in Athletics
- Venue: RSC Olimpiyskiy
- Dates: 10 July (qualification); 12 July (final)
- Competitors: 21
- Winning height: 1.88 PB

Medalists
gold medal	Eleanor Patterson	Australia
silver medal	Erika Furlani	Italy
bronze medal	Rhizlane Siba	Morocco
bronze medal	Julia du Plessis	South Africa

The girls' high jump at the 2013 World Youth Championships in Athletics was held on 10 and 12 July.

== Medalists ==
Gold	Silver	Bronze
Eleanor Patterson; Australia	Erika Furlani; Italy	Rhizlane Siba; Morocco
Eleanor Patterson; Australia	Erika Furlani; Italy	Julia du Plessis; South Africa

== Records ==
Prior to the competition, the following records were as follows.

World Youth Best	Charmaine Gale-Weavers (RSA)	1.96	Bloemfontein, South Africa	4 April 1981
World Youth Best	Olga Turchak (URS)	1.96	Donetsk, Soviet Union	7 September 1984
Championship Record	Iryna Kovalenko (UKR)	1.92	Sherbrooke, Canada	12 July 2003
World Youth Leading	Eleanor Patterson (AUS)	1.86	Perth, Australia	12 March 2013

== Qualification ==
Qualification rule: 1.79 (Q) or at least 12 best performers (q) qualified.

Rank	Group	Name	Nationality	1.60	1.65	1.70	1.74	1.77	1.79	Result	Notes
1	B	Erika Furlani	Italy	–	o	o	o	o		1.77	q
1	B	Julia du Plessis	South Africa	–	o	o	o	o		1.77	q
3	B	Anne Klebsch	Germany	o	o	o	xxo	o		1.77	q
4	B	Ana Caetano de Oliveira	Brazil	–	o	o	o	xo		1.77	q
4	B	Deborah Vomsattel	Switzerland	–	o	o	o	xo		1.77	q
6	A	Alexa Harmon-Thomas	United States	–	–	xo	o	xo		1.77	q
6	A	Nawal Meniker	France	–	o	o	xo	xo		1.77	q
6	A	Rhizlane Siba	Morocco	–	o	o	xo	xo		1.77	q
9	A	Elina Kakko	Finland	–	o	o	o	xxo		1.77	q
9	A	Hannah Joye	Australia	–	–	o	o	xxo		1.77	q
11	B	Eleanor Patterson	Australia	–	–	–	o	–		1.74	q
11	A	Ximena Esquivel	Mexico	o	o	o	o	xxx		1.74	q
11	A	Yuliya Levchenko	Ukraine	o	o	o	o	xxx		1.74	q
14	B	Zuzana Karaffová	Slovakia	xo	o	o	o	xxx		1.74	
15	B	Robyn Petitt	Great Britain	–	o	xo	xo	xxx		1.74	
16	B	Nataliya Gumenyuk	Russia	o	o	xo	xxo	xxx		1.74	
17	B	Fanny Pinteau	France	–	xo	xo	xxx			1.70	
18	A	Lara Gril	Slovenia	o	o	xxo	xxx			1.70	
19	A	Eleonora Omoregie	Italy	o	xo	xxo	xxx			1.70	
20	A	Sophie Frank	Germany	o	o	xxx				1.65	
21	B	Danna García	Mexico	o	xxo	xxx				1.65	

== Final ==
Rank	Name	Nationality	1.65	1.70	1.75	1.79	1.82	1.85	1.88	1.91	Result	Notes
1st place, gold medalist(s)	Eleanor Patterson	Australia	–	–	–	o	o	o	xo	xxx	1.88	PB
2nd place, silver medalist(s)	Erika Furlani	Italy	o	o	xo	xo	xxo				1.82	PB
3rd place, bronze medalist(s)	Julia du Plessis	South Africa	o	o	o	o	xxx				1.79	
3rd place, bronze medalist(s)	Rhizlane Siba	Morocco	–	o	o	o	xxx				1.79	
5	Ana Caetano de Oliveira	Brazil	o	o	xxo	o	xxx				1.79	
6	Anne Klebsch	Germany	xo	o	xxo	o	xxx				1.79	SB
7	Hannah Joye	Australia	–	xo	o	xo	xxx				1.79	
8	Nawal Meniker	France	o	o	xo	xxx					1.75	
8	Elina Kakko	Finland	o	o	xo	xxx					1.75	
10	Alexa Harmon-Thomas	United States	–	xo	xo	xxx					1.75	
11	Deborah Vomsattel	Switzerland	o	o	xxo	xxx					1.75	
12	Ximena Esquivel	Mexico	o	o	xxx						1.70	
13	Yuliya Levchenko	Ukraine	o	xo	xxx						1.70	
