= Athletics at the 2009 Summer Universiade – Women's high jump =

The women's high jump event at the 2009 Summer Universiade was held on 10–12 July.

== Medalists ==
Gold	Silver	Bronze
Ariane Friedrich; Germany	Yekaterina Yevseyeva; Kazakhstan	Julia Wanner; Germany

== Results ==
=== Qualification ===
Qualification: 1.91 m (Q) or at least 12 best (q) qualified for the final.

Rank	Group	Athlete	Nationality	1.60	1.70	1.75	1.80	1.85	1.89	Result	Notes
1	B	Ariane Friedrich	Germany	–	–	–	–	–	o	1.89	q
2	A	Hannelore Desmet	Belgium	–	o	o	o	o	–	1.85	q
2	A	Anna Iljuštšenko	Estonia	–	–	–	o	o	–	1.85	q
2	A	Julia Wanner	Germany	–	–	o	o	o	–	1.85	q
2	B	Noengrothai Chaipetch	Thailand	–	o	o	o	o	x	1.85	q
2	B	Kamila Stepaniuk	Poland	–	–	o	o	o	x	1.85	q
7	A	Yekaterina Yevseyeva	Kazakhstan	–	o	o	o	xo	–	1.85	q
7	B	Oldřiška Marešová	Czech Republic	–	–	o	o	xo	x	1.85	q
7	B	Ellen Pettitt	Australia	–	–	o	o	xo	x	1.85	q
10	A	Rene van der Merwe	South Africa	–	o	o	o	xxo	–	1.85	q, PB
11	A	Zoe Timmers	Australia	–	o	o	o	xxx		1.80	q
12	A	Fabiola Ayala	Mexico	–	xo	o	o	xxx		1.80	q
13	A	Qiao Yanrui	China	–	o	o	xo	xxx		1.80	
14	B	Anna Ustinova	Kazakhstan	–	–	o	xxo	xxx		1.80	
15	A	Anna Alexson	Sweden	–	o	xo	xxo	xxx		1.80	
16	B	Lindsey Bergevin	Canada	–	o	o	xxx			1.75	
16	B	Karina Vnukova	Lithuania	–	–	o	xxx			1.75	
18	B	Alejandra Gómez	Costa Rica	o	o	xo	xxx			1.75	
19	B	Persefoni Hatzinakou	Greece	–	o	xxo	xxx			1.75	
20	A	Dunja Spajić	Serbia	o	xo	xxx				1.70	
21	A	Foteini Foteinogianopoulou	Greece	xo	xxx					1.60	
21	B	Ivana Vukomanović	Serbia	xo	xxx					1.60	
	B	Irina Gordeeva	Russia							DNS	

=== Final ===
Rank	Athlete	Nationality	1.75	1.80	1.85	1.88	1.91	1.94	2.00	2.02	Result	Notes
1st place, gold medalist(s)	Ariane Friedrich	Germany	–	–	–	–	xo	o	o	xxx	2.00	
2nd place, silver medalist(s)	Yekaterina Yevseyeva	Kazakhstan	o	o	xo	xo	o	xxx			1.91	
3rd place, bronze medalist(s)	Julia Wanner	Germany	o	o	xo	o	xxo	xxx			1.91	
4	Kamila Stepaniuk	Poland	o	o	xxo	o	xxx				1.88	
5	Anna Iljuštšenko	Estonia	–	o	xxo	xxo	xxx				1.88	
6	Noengrothai Chaipetch	Thailand	o	o	o	xxx					1.85	
6	Oldřiška Marešová	Czech Republic	o	o	o	xxx					1.85	
6	Zoe Timmers	Australia	o	o	o	xxx					1.85	
9	Fabiola Ayala	Mexico	o	xo	xo	xxx					1.85	SB
10	Hannelore Desmet	Belgium	o	xxo	xo	xxx					1.85	
11	Rene van der Merwe	South Africa	o	o	xxo	xxx					1.85	
12	Ellen Pettitt	Australia	o	o	xxx						1.80	
