= Doreen Amata =

Nigerian high jumper

Personal information
- Born: 6 May 1988 (age 38) Lagos, Nigeria
- Height: 1.91 m (6 ft 3 in)
- Weight: 63 kg (139 lb)
Medal record
Women's athletics
Representing Nigeria
All-Africa Games
| Gold medal – first place | 2007 Algiers | High jump |
| Gold medal – first place | 2011 Maputo | High jump |
| Silver medal – second place | 2015 Brazzaville | High jump |
African Championships
| Silver medal – second place | 2016 Durban | High jump |

Eyawomano Doreen Amata (born 6 May 1988) is a Nigerian track and field athlete who specialises in the high jump event.

Amata represented Nigeria at the 2008 Olympic Games, finishing in 16th place in the overall-rankings. She claimed a gold medal for her native West African country at the 2007 All-Africa Games.

Amata competed for Nigeria at the 2016 Summer Olympics, but she did not qualify for the finals. She was the flag bearer for Nigeria during the closing ceremony.

Her personal bests in the event are 1.95 metres outdoors (Abuja 2008, Daegu 2011) and 1.93 metres (Banska Bystrica 2016).

== Competition record ==
| Year | Competition | Venue | Position | Notes |
Representing Nigeria
| 2007 | All-Africa Games | Algiers, Algeria | 1st | 1.89 m |
| 2008 | African Championships | Addis Ababa, Ethiopia | – | NM |
| 2008 | Olympic Games | Beijing, China | 16th (q) | 1.89 m |
| 2009 | World Championships | Berlin, Germany | 27th (q) | 1.85 m |
| 2011 | World Championships | Daegu, South Korea | 7th | 1.93 m |
| 2011 | All-Africa Games | Maputo, Mozambique | 1st | 1.80 m |
| 2012 | African Championships | Porto-Novo, Benin | 4th | 1.75 m |
| 2012 | Olympic Games | London, United Kingdom | 17th (q) | 1.90 m |
| 2015 | World Championships | Beijing, China | 12th | 1.88 m |
| 2015 | African Games | Brazzaville, Republic of the Congo | 2nd | 1.85 m |
| 2016 | World Indoor Championships | Portland, United States | 9th | 1.89 m |
| 2016 | African Championships | Durban, South Africa | 2nd | 1.82 m |
| 2016 | Olympic Games | Rio de Janeiro, Brazil | 27th (q) | 1.89 m |
| 2018 | Commonwealth Games | Gold Coast, Australia | 10th | 1.80 m |
| 2019 | African Games | Rabat, Morocco | 5th | 1.78 m |
