= Julia du Plessis =

South African high jumper (born 1996)

Personal information
- Born: 27 May 1996 (age 29)

Sport
- Country: South Africa
- Sport: Athletics
- Event: High jump

Julia du Plessis (born 27 May 1996) is a South African female professional high jumper. She is the 2015 African Games bronze medallist.

A child prodigy, her personal best jump is 1.88 metres, achieved in March 2012 in Germiston. In the age-specific categories she went on to win the bronze medal at the 2013 World Youth Championships, the silver medal at the 2015 African Junior Championships and finished twelfth at the 2012 World Junior Championships.

She won the bronze medal at the 2015 African Games, finished eighth at the 2016 African Championships, tenth at the 2017 Summer Universiade and sixth at the 2018 African Championships.

== Achievements ==
All information taken from World Athletics profile.

=== National titles ===
- South African Championships
  - High jump: 2014, 2015, 2016, 2017, 2018, 2019
- USSA Championships
  - High jump: 2015, 2016, 2017, 2018, 2019
- South African U23 Championships
  - High jump: 2016
- South African Junior Championships
  - High jump: 2012
- South African U18 Championships
  - High jump: 2012, 2013
