= Anika Smit =

South African high jumper

Medal record

Women's athletics

Representing South Africa

African Championships
Gold medal – first place	2008 Addis Ababa	High jump
Silver medal – second place	2012 Porto-Novo	High jump

Anika Smit (born 26 May 1986) is a South African professional athlete specialising in the high jump. She is well known for winning the gold at the 2006 Commonwealth Games in Melbourne. Her personal best is 1.93 metres achieved in 2007 in Potchefstroom.

== Competition record ==
Year	Competition	Venue	Position	Notes
Representing South Africa
2003	World Youth Championships	Sherbrooke, Canada	5th	1.78 m
2003	All-Africa Games	Abuja, Nigeria	3rd	1.80 m
2003	Afro-Asian Games	Hyderabad, India	5th	1.70 m
2004	World Junior Championships	Grosseto, Italy	10th	1.80 m
2005	African Junior Championships	Radès, Tunisia	1st	1.89 m
2006	Commonwealth Games	Melbourne, Australia	1st	1.91 m
2006	African Championships	Bambous, Mauritius	–	NM
2007	All-Africa Games	Algiers, Algeria	2nd	1.89 m
2008	African Championships	Addis Ababa, Ethiopia	1st	1.88 m
2011	All-Africa Games	Maputo, Mozambique	4th	1.75 m
2012	African Championships	Porto-Novo, Benin	2nd	1.86 m
