= Oldřiška Marešová =

Czech high jumper

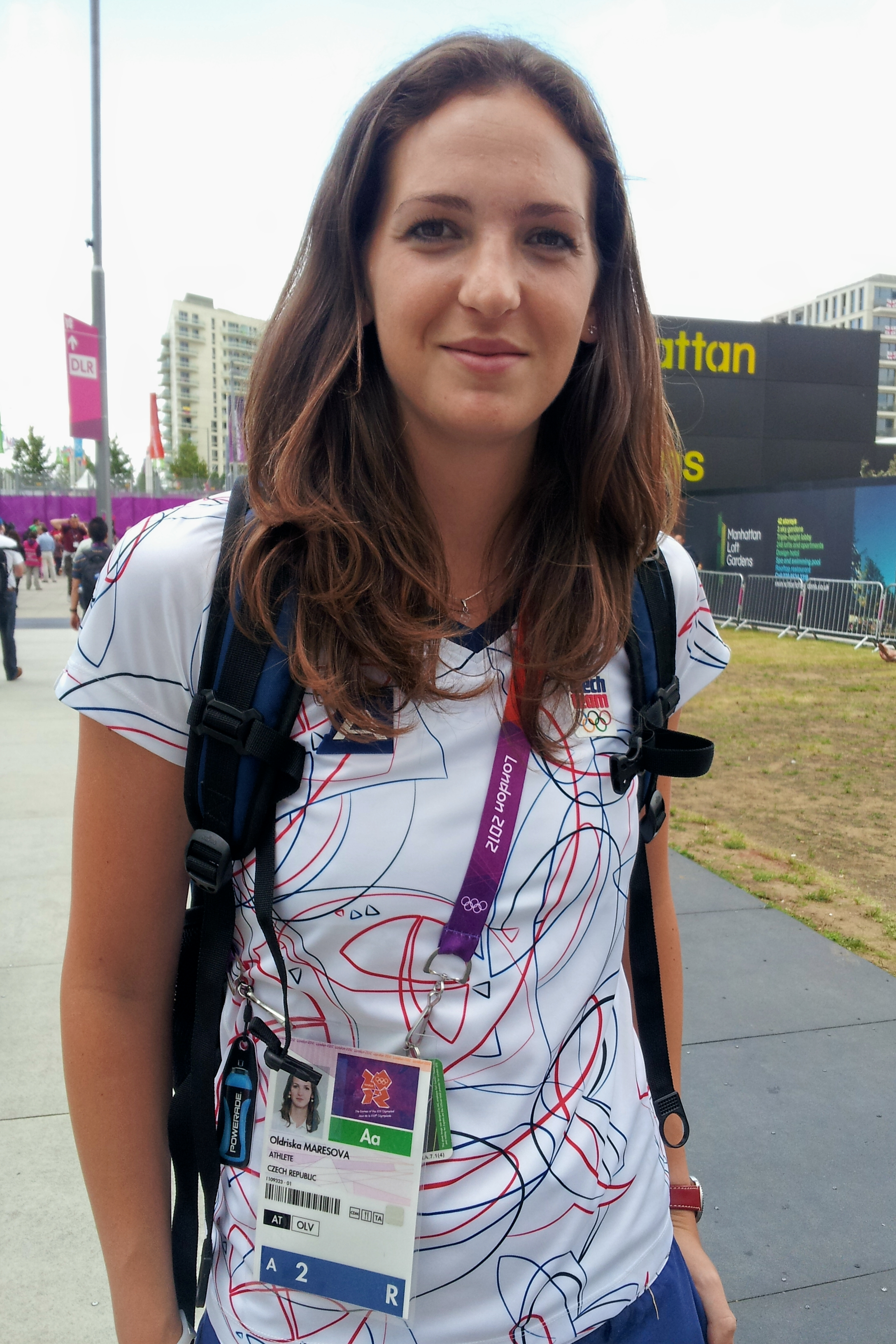
- Oldřiška Marešová at the 2012 London Summer Olympics

Personal information
- Born: October 14, 1986 (age 39) Litoměřice, Czechoslovakia
- Education: Czech University of Life Sciences Prague
- Height: 1.89 m (6 ft 2 1/2 in)
- Weight: 69 kg (152 lb)

Sport
- Country: Czech Republic
- Sport: Athletics
- Event: High jump
- Club: PSK Olymp Praha

Oldřiška Marešová (born 14 October 1986 in Litoměřice) is a Czech track and field athlete who specialises in the high jump. She has competed at the 2012 Summer Olympics. She was 3rd at the 2003 European Youth Olympic Festival.

Her personal bests in the event are 1.92 metres outdoors (Olomouc 2012) and 1.92 metres indoors (Valašské Meziříčí 2015).

== Competition record ==
Year	Competition	Venue	Position	Notes
Representing Czech Republic
2003	World Youth Championships	Sherbrooke, Canada	4th	1.81 m
2003	European Youth Olympic Festival	Paris, France	3rd	1.82 m
2004	World Junior Championships	Grosseto, Italy	6th	1.87 m
2005	European Junior Championships	Helsinki, Finland	6th	1.82 m
2009	Universiade	Belgrade, Serbia	6th	1.85 m
2011	Universiade	Shenzhen, China	6th	1.86 m
2012	European Championships	Helsinki, Finland	17th (q)	1.83 m
2012	Summer Olympics	London, United Kingdom	29th (q)	1.80 m
2015	European Indoor Championships	Prague, Czech Republic	14th (q)	1.87 m
2015	World Championships	Beijing, China	19th (q)	1.89 m
