= Athletics at the 2007 All-Africa Games – Women's high jump =

The women's high jump at the 2007 All-Africa Games was held on July 19.

== Results ==
Rank	Athlete	Nationality	Result	Notes
1st place, gold medalist(s)	Doreen Amata	Nigeria	1.89	
2nd place, silver medalist(s)	Anika Smit	South Africa	1.89	
3rd place, bronze medalist(s)	Marcoleen Pretorius	South Africa	1.83	
4	Rene van der Merwe	South Africa	1.83	
5	Nneka Ukuh	Nigeria	1.79	
6	Rim Hussin Abdallah	Egypt	1.70	
	Arlette Ngadjama	Central African Republic	NM	
