= Athletics at the 2003 All-Africa Games – Women's high jump =

The women's high jump event at the 2003 All-Africa Games was held on October 12.

== Results ==
Rank	Name	Nationality	Result	Notes
1st place, gold medalist(s)	Nkeka Ukuh	Nigeria	1.84	
2nd place, silver medalist(s)	Marizca Gertenbach	South Africa	1.84	
3rd place, bronze medalist(s)	Anika Smit	South Africa	1.80	
4	Sarah Bouaoudia	Algeria	1.70	
5	Hanen Dhouibi	Tunisia	1.70	
6	Amina Lemgherbi	Algeria	1.70	
6	Zara Ouedraogo	Burkina Faso	1.70	
6	Mariam Umoru	Nigeria	1.70	
9	Mama Gassama	Gambia	1.65	
