= 2004 World Junior Championships in Athletics – Women's high jump =

The women's high jump event at the 2004 World Junior Championships in Athletics was held in Grosseto, Italy, at Stadio Olimpico Carlo Zecchini on 16 and 18 July.

== Medalists ==
Gold	Irina Kovalenko; Ukraine
Silver	Svetlana Shkolina; Russia
Bronze	Sharon Day; United States

== Results ==
=== Final ===
18 July

Rank	Name	Nationality	Result	Notes
1st place, gold medalist(s)	Irina Kovalenko	Ukraine	1.93	
2nd place, silver medalist(s)	Svetlana Shkolina	Russia	1.91	
3rd place, bronze medalist(s)	Sharon Day	United States	1.91	
4	Annett Engel	Germany	1.87	
5	Svetlana Akulenko	Ukraine	1.87	
6	Oldriška Marešová	Czech Republic	1.87	
7	Adonía Steryíou	Greece	1.84	
7	Anna Ustinova	Kazakhstan	1.84	
9	Irina Gordeyeva	Russia	1.80	
10	Anika Smit	South Africa	1.80	
11	Aileen Herrmann	Germany	1.75	
11	Inika McPherson	United States	1.75	
13	Svetlana Radzivil	Uzbekistan	1.75	
	Iryna Iskryk	Belarus	NH	

=== Qualifications ===
16 July

==== Group A ====
Rank	Name	Nationality	Result	Notes
1	Annett Engel	Germany	1.83	q
1	Irina Kovalenko	Ukraine	1.83	q
3	Oldriška Marešová	Czech Republic	1.83	q
4	Iryna Iskryk	Belarus	1.83	q
5	Irina Gordeyeva	Russia	1.79	q
5	Sharon Day	United States	1.79	q
7	Adonía Steryíou	Greece	1.79	q
8	Anika Smit	South Africa	1.79	q
9	Monica Cuperlo	Italy	1.75	
10	Kay-De Vaughn	Belize	1.60	

==== Group B ====
Rank	Name	Nationality	Result	Notes
1	Svetlana Akulenko	Ukraine	1.83	q
2	Anna Ustinova	Kazakhstan	1.83	q
3	Svetlana Shkolina	Russia	1.83	q
3	Svetlana Radzivil	Uzbekistan	1.83	q
5	Aileen Herrmann	Germany	1.79	q
5	Inika McPherson	United States	1.79	q
7	Yelena Ivanova	Belarus	1.75	
7	Anna Iljuštšenko	Estonia	1.75	
9	Ellen Pettitt	Australia	1.75	
10	Gema Martín-Pozuelo	Spain	1.70	

== Participation ==
According to an unofficial count, 20 athletes from 15 countries participated in the event.

- Australia (1)
- Belarus (2)
- Belize (1)
- Czech Republic (1)
- Estonia (1)
- Germany (2)
- Greece (1)
- Italy (1)
- Kazakhstan (1)
- Russia (2)
- South Africa (1)
- Spain (1)
- Ukraine (2)
- United States (2)
- Uzbekistan (1)
