= 2006 African Championships in Athletics – Women's high jump =

The women's high jump event at the 2006 African Championships in Athletics was held at the Stade Germain Comarmond on August 11.

== Results ==
Rank	Name	Nationality	1.60	1.65	1.70	1.75	1.80	1.84	1.87	Result	Notes
1st place, gold medalist(s)	Rene van der Merwe	South Africa	–	o	o	o	o	xo	xxx	1.84	
2nd place, silver medalist(s)	Nkeka Ukuh	Nigeria	–	o	o	o	xxo	xxx		1.80	
3rd place, bronze medalist(s)	Sarah Bouaoudia	Algeria	–	–	xo	o	xxx			1.75	
4	Marna Fourie	South Africa	–	o	o	xo	xxx			1.75	
5	Patience Okoro	Nigeria	o	o	xo	xxx				1.70	
6	Arielle Brette	Mauritius	o	xo	xxo	xxx				1.70	
	Anika Smit	South Africa								NM	
