= Lissa Labiche =

Seychellois athlete

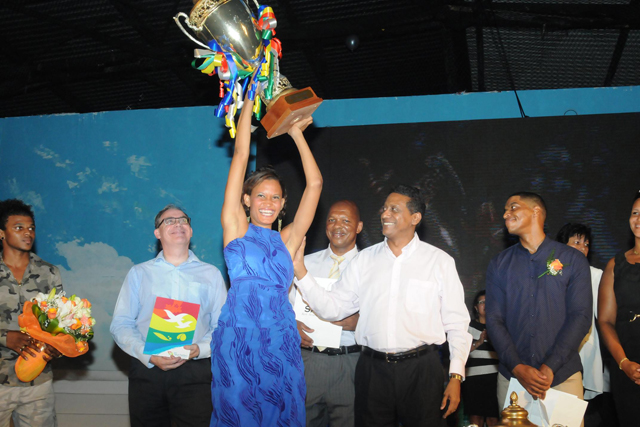
- Labiche holding the Seychelles female athlete of the year trophy for 2015

Personal information
- Born: February 18, 1993 (age 33)
- Height: 1.72 m (5 ft 7 1/2 in)
- Weight: 55 kg (121 lb)

Sport
- Country: Seychelles
- Sport: Athletics
- Events: High jump, long jump, heptathlon
- College team: South Carolina Gamecocks
Medal record
Women's athletics
Representing Seychelles
African Games
Gold medal – first place	2015 Brazzaville	High jump
Bronze medal – third place	2011 Maputo	High jump
Bronze medal – third place	2015 Brazzaville	Long jump
African Championships
Gold medal – first place	2012 Porto-Novo	High jump
Gold medal – first place	2016 Durban	High jump
Silver medal – second place	2010 Nairobi	High jump
- Updated on 26 August 2016

Lissa Mary Audrey Labiche (born February 18, 1993) is Seychellois athlete competing in the high jump and occasionally long jump.

== Career ==
In the Women's high jump event at the 2012 Summer Olympics, she finished tied for 20th place and did not advance to the final.

She represented the Seychelles at the 2016 Summer Olympics in Rio de Janeiro. She finished 29th in the qualifying round of the women's high jump and did not advance to the finals. She was the flag bearer for the Seychelles at the closing ceremony.

== Competition record ==
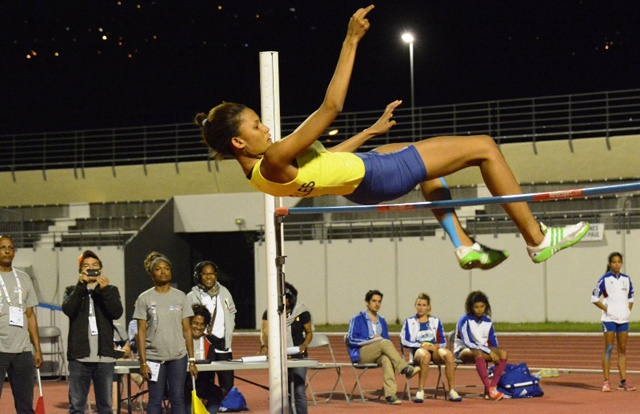
Lissa Labiche winning the gold medal in the high jump at the Indian Ocean Island Games in 2015.

Year	Competition	Venue	Position	Event	Notes
Representing Seychelles
2009	World Youth Championships	Brixen, Italy	20th (q)	High jump	1.74 m
2009	African Junior Championships	Bambous, Mauritius	1st	High jump	1.69 m
2009	Jeux de la Francophonie	Beirut, Lebanon	8th	High jump	1.70 m
2010	African Championships	Nairobi, Kenya	2nd	High jump	1.70 m
2010	Commonwealth Games	Delhi, India	12th	High jump	1.68 m
2011	African Junior Championships	Gaborone, Botswana	2nd	High jump	1.70 m
2011	African Junior Championships	Gaborone, Botswana	3rd	Heptathlon	4663 pts
2011	All-Africa Games	Maputo, Mozambique	3rd	High jump	1.80 m
2011	All-Africa Games	Maputo, Mozambique	9th	Long jump	5.70 m (w)
2012	African Championships	Porto-Novo, Benin	1st	High jump	1.86 m (NR)
2012	African Championships	Porto-Novo, Benin	12th	Long jump	NM
2012	World Junior Championships	Barcelona, Spain	2nd	High jump	1.88 m (NR)
2012	Olympic Games	London, United Kingdom	20th (q)	High jump	1.85 m
2014	Commonwealth Games	Glasgow, United Kingdom	18th (q)	High jump	1.71 m
2015	World Championships	Beijing, China	21st (q)	High jump	1.89 m
2015	African Games	Brazzaville, Republic of the Congo	1st	High jump	1.91 m
2015	African Games	Brazzaville, Republic of the Congo	3rd	Long jump	6.25 m
2016	World Indoor Championships	Portland, United States	10th	High jump	1.89 m
2016	African Championships	Durban, South Africa	1st	High jump	1.85 m
2016	Olympic Games	Rio de Janeiro, Brazil	29th (q)	High jump	1.85 m
2017	Jeux de la Francophonie	Abidjan, Ivory Coast	1st	High jump	1.91 m

== Personal bests ==
Outdoor

- 800 m – 2:47.15 (Gaborone 2011)
- 100 m hurdles – 15.59 (-0.8 m/s) (Gaborone 2011)
- High jump – 1.92 m (Potchefstroom 2015) NR
- Long jump – 6.28 m (-4.6 m/s) (Windhoek 2012)
- Shot put – 9.85 m (Gaborone 2011)
- Javelin throw – 24.49 m (Gaborone 2011)
- Heptathlon – 4663 pts (Gaborone 2011)

Indoor

- High jump – 1.89 m (Portland 2016)
