= Athletics at the 2011 All-Africa Games – Women's high jump =

The women's high jump event at the 2011 All-Africa Games was held on 12 September.

== Results ==
Rank	Athlete	Nationality	1.65	1.70	1.75	1.80	1.85	1.88	Result	Notes
1st place, gold medalist(s)	Doreen Amata	Nigeria	–	–	–	o	xx–	x	1.80	
2nd place, silver medalist(s)	Uhunoma Osazuwa	Nigeria	–	o	o	xo	xxx		1.80	
3rd place, bronze medalist(s)	Lissa Labiche	Seychelles	xo	xo	xo	xxo	xxx		1.80	
4	Anika Smit	South Africa	–	o	o	xxx			1.75	
5	Besnet Ali Ibrahim	Egypt	o	–	xo	xxx			1.75	
6	Selloane Tsoaeli	Lesotho	xo	o	xxx				1.70	
