= Karen Beautle =

Jamaican high jumper (born 1971)

Personal information
- Full name: Karen Rose Marie Beautle
- Nationality: Jamaican
- Born: 13 June 1971 (age 55)

Sport
- Sport: Athletics
- Event: High jump

Achievements and titles
- Personal best: 1.89 m (2000)
Medal record
Representing Jamaica
Commonwealth Games
Bronze medal – third place	2006 Melbourne	High jump

Karen Rose Marie Beautle (born 13 June 1971) is a Jamaican high jumper. She competed at the Olympic Games in 2000 and three Commonwealth Games, winning the bronze medal at the 2006 Commonwealth Games.

== Career ==
Beautle became Jamaican champion in the high jump in 1998, 1999, 2002, 2004 and 2006. She won her first regional medal at the 1997 Central American and Caribbean Championships, where she claimed the silver. In 1998 she finished fourth at the Central American and Caribbean Games and ninth at the Commonwealth Games. Her best result came when she won the Jamaican U19 Championships in Kingston in March 1998. Her only regional gold medal came at the 1999 Central American and Caribbean Championships; the same year she finished sixth at the 1999 Pan American Games.

In February 2000, Beautle, still a U20 athlete, achieved her lifetime best when jumping 1.89 metres in Kingston. She competed at the 2000 Olympic Games without reaching the final. She competed seldomly in 2001, and not at all in 2003.

In 2002, however, she became national champion with a 1.87 metre jump and proceeded to compete in the United Kingdom throughout the summer, registering 1.88 m in Cardiff. She rounded off with a fifth place at the 2002 Commonwealth Games before finishing fourth at the 2002 Central American and Caribbean Games.

She later won the silver medal at the 2005 Central American and Caribbean Championships, the bronze medal at the 2006 Commonwealth Games and finished fourth at the 2006 Central American and Caribbean Games. At the 2006 Commonwealth Games, Beautle edged out five other jumpers who, like her, failed at 1.88 metres. Beautle edged ahead on countback.

Beautle started coaching high jumpers of the Rochester Yellowjackets in 2011, though as a volunteer.
