= Athletics at the 2015 African Games – Women's high jump =

The women's high jump event at the 2015 African Games was held on 14 September.

== Results ==
| Rank | Name | Nationality | 1.60 | 1.70 | 1.75 | 1.80 | 1.85 | 1.88 | 1.91 | 1.94 | Result | Notes |
|---|---|---|---|---|---|---|---|---|---|---|---|---|
| 1st place, gold medalist(s) | Lissa Labiche | Seychelles | – | – | o | o | o | o | xo | xxx | 1.91 | |
| 2nd place, silver medalist(s) | Doreen Amata | Nigeria | – | – | o | o | o | x– | xx | | 1.85 | |
| 3rd place, bronze medalist(s) | Julia du Plessis | South Africa | o | o | o | o | xxx | | | | 1.80 | |
| 4 | Ariyat Dibow | Ethiopia | o | o | o | xo | xxx | | | | 1.80 | |
| 5 | Motunrayo Sasegbom | Nigeria | – | o | o | xxo | xxx | | | | 1.80 | |
| 6 | Hoda Atef | Egypt | o | o | xxo | xxx | | | | | 1.75 | |
| 7 | Ndeye Diame Diop | Senegal | o | xo | xxo | xxx | | | | | 1.75 | |
| 8 | Geraldine King | South Africa | o | o | xxx | | | | | | 1.70 | |
| 9 | Bassant Hassan | Egypt | xo | o | xxx | | | | | | 1.70 | |
| 9 | Kut Uchan | Ethiopia | xo | o | xxx | | | | | | 1.70 | |
| 11 | Marlize Higgens | South Africa | xo | xo | xxx | | | | | | 1.70 | |
| | Uhunoma Osazuwa | Nigeria | | | | | | | | | DNS | |
