= 2016 African Championships in Athletics – Women's high jump =

Women's athletic jump

The women's high jump event at the 2016 African Championships in Athletics was held on 26 June in Kings Park Stadium.

== Results ==
Rank	Athlete	Nationality	Result	Notes
1st place, gold medalist(s)	Lissa Labiche	Seychelles	1.85	
2nd place, silver medalist(s)	Doreen Amata	Nigeria	1.82	
3rd place, bronze medalist(s)	Basant Hassan	Egypt	1.79	
4	Abigail Kwarteng	Ghana	1.76	
5	Regina Yeboah	Ghana	1.73	
5	Rhizlane Siba	Morocco	1.73	
5	Brittany Uys	South Africa	1.73	
8	Julia du Plessis	South Africa	1.73	
9	Ndeye Gueye	Senegal	1.73	
10	Ariyat Dibow	Ethiopia	1.70	
11	Erika Seyama	Swaziland	1.65	
12	Michelle Pretorius	Namibia	1.65	
	Uhunoma Osazuwa	Nigeria	DNS	
	Kayla Wells	Zimbabwe	DNS	
	Yvonne Robson	South Africa	DNS	
