= Inika McPherson =

American high jumper

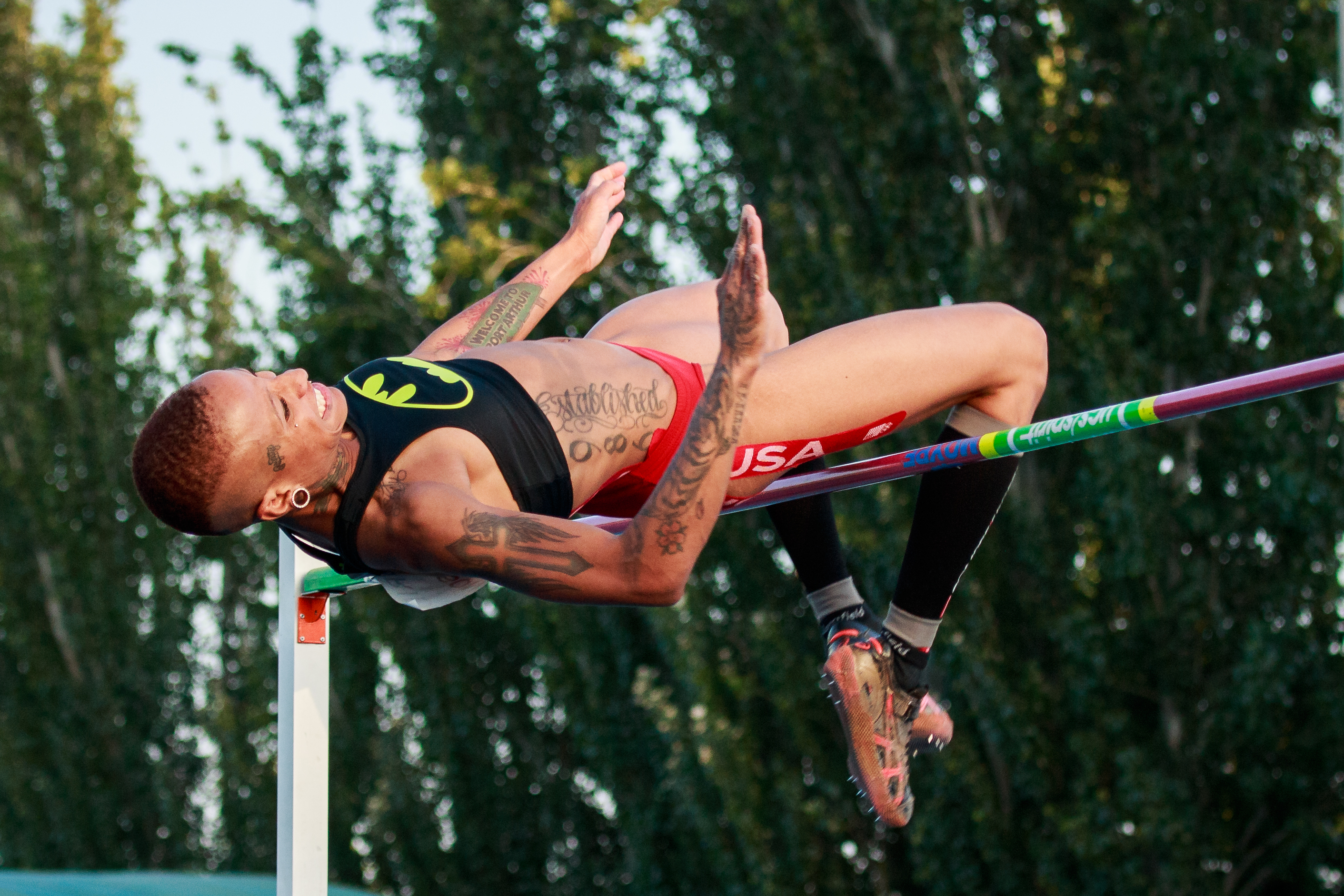

Personal information
- Born: September 29, 1986 (age 40) Port Arthur, Texas, U.S.
- Height: 5 ft 4 in (1.63 m)

Sport
- Sport: Track and field
- Event: High jump
- College team: Cal Bears

Achievements and titles
- Personal best: High jump: 1.96m (2014,2017)
- Updated on July 2024

Inika McPherson (born September 29, 1986, in Port Arthur, Texas) is an American track and field athlete specializing in the high jump. She was the 2013 US Indoor champion.

During her career, McPherson has been issued with two, separate anti-doping violation competition bans.

== Early career ==
She was a 2005 graduate of Memorial High School, of Port Arthur, Texas where she was freshman state champion and a six foot high jumper as a freshman in high school. McPherson shares the freshman high school record with Amy Acuff 6 ft. Was also named ESPN female high jumper of the decade. Her high school best was 6 ft 2 in (1.88 m). She also excelled in the triple jump and lettered in four sports, was Texas University Interscholastic League All-State and carried a 5.0 GPA.

== College ==
Her next stop was the University of California, Berkeley where she set the school indoor record and was a three time NCAA All American, though she didn't get back to the range of her 6'2" from high school. Due to an injury she battled with during her years at Cal which caused her to have ankle surgery on her take off foot in 2008. In 2009 McPherson came off ankle surgery and captured the Pac 10 Championship title and named female Athlete of the year at the University of California.

== Professional ==
She represented the United States at the 2016 Rio Olympics finishing with a 10th-place performance in the high jump final, 2007 Pan American Games, the 2011 and 2013 World Championships and the 2012 and 2014 World Indoor Championships. Also, represented the United States at the 2017 World Championships in London, the 2018 World Indoor Championships in Birmingham, England, and the 2019 World Championships in Doha, Qatar.

== Anti-doping violations ==
In 2014, McPherson tested positive for benzoylecgonine, the main metabolite of cocaine, at the USA Outdoor Track and Field Championships and subsequently received a 21-month competition ban through March 2016.

In 2023, McPherson was issued with a 16 month competition ban that ran from June 2022 to November 2023 after testing positive for unintentional use of furosemide. This was a consequence of ingesting another person's medication believing that it was a permitted anti-inflammatory medication.

== International competitions ==
Year	Competition	Venue	Position	Notes
Representing the United States
2004	World Junior Championships	Grosseto, Italy	11th	1.75 m
2007	Pan American Games	Rio de Janeiro, Brazil	11th	1.78 m
2011	World Championships	Daegu, South Korea	27th (q)	1.80 m
2012	World Indoor Championships	Istanbul, Turkey	–	NM
2013	World Championships	Moscow, Russia	18th (q)	1.88 m
2014	World Indoor Championships	Sopot, Poland	12th (q)	1.92 m
2016	Olympic Games	Rio de Janeiro, Brazil	10th	1.93 m
2017	World Championships	London, United Kingdom	9th	1.92 m
2018	World Indoor Championships	Birmingham, United Kingdom	7th	1.84 m
2019	World Championships	Doha, Qatar	18th (q)	1.85 m
