= 2014 African Championships in Athletics – Women's high jump =

The women's high jump event at the 2014 African Championships in Athletics was held on August 12 on Stade de Marrakech.

== Results ==
Rank	Athlete	Nationality	1.50	1.55	1.60	1.65	1.70	1.75	1.78	1.80	1.82	Result	Notes
1st place, gold medalist(s)	Rhizlane Siba	Morocco	–	–	–	–	o	o	xo	o	xxx	1.80	
2nd place, silver medalist(s)	Besnet Moussad Mohamed	Egypt	–	–	–	o	o	o	xxo	xxo	xxx	1.80	
3rd place, bronze medalist(s)	Ariyat Dibow	Ethiopia	o	o	o	o	o	xo	o	xxx		1.78	NR
4	Naya Owusu	Ghana	–	–	o	xxo	o	xxx				1.70	
