= Antonia Stergiou =

Greek high jumper (born 1985)

Personal information
- Born: July 7, 1985 (age 41) Sarandë, People's Socialist Republic of Albania

Sport
- Country: Greece
- Sport: Athletics
- Event: High jump

Achievements and titles
- Personal bests: 1.97 m, 1.91 m (i)
Medal record
Women's athletics
Representing Greece
Mediterranean Games
Bronze medal – third place	2009 Pescara	High jump
Bronze medal – third place	2013 Mersin	High jump
- Updated on 15 January 2014

Antonia Stergiou (Greek: Αντωνία Στεργίου, born 7 July 1985) is a Greek high jumper. She is competing with the athletics club A.O. Kouros Patron, situated in Patras.

She finished seventh at the 2004 World Junior Championships, won the silver medal at the 2007 European U23 Championships and the bronze medal at the 2009 Mediterranean Games in Pescara. She entered the final at the 2010 European Championships in Barcelona, taking the 8th place.

Her personal best jump is 1.97 metres, achieved in June 2008 in Athens.

== Honours ==
Year	Competition	Venue	Position	Notes
Representing Greece
2004	World Junior Championships	Grosseto, Italy	7th	1.84 m
2005	European U23 Championships	Erfurt, Germany	10th	1.75 m
2007	European U23 Championships	Debrecen, Hungary	2nd	1.92 m
2008	Olympic Games	Beijing, PR China	24th (q)	1.85 m
2009	European Indoor Championships	Turin, Italy	12th (q)	1.85 m
2009	Mediterranean Games	Pescara, Italy	3rd	1.89 m
2009	World Championships	Berlin, Germany	13th (q)	1.92 m SB
2010	European Championships	Barcelona, Spain	8th	1.92 m SB
2012	European Championships	Helsinki, Finland	11th	1.80 m
2012	Olympic Games	London, United Kingdom	13th (q)	1.93 m SB
2013	Mediterranean Games	Mersin, Turkey	3rd	1.90 m
2013	Universiade	Kazan, Russia	5th	1.87 m
2013	World Championships	Moscow, Russia	20th (q)	1.83 m
