= Athletics at the 2007 Pan American Games – Women's high jump =

Women's high jump at the Pan American Games

The women's high jump event at the 2007 Pan American Games was held on July 25.

== Results ==
Rank	Athlete	Nationality	1.55	1.60	1.65	1.70	1.75	1.78	1.81	1.84	1.87	1.89	1.91	1.93	1.95	1.97	Result	Notes
1st place, gold medalist(s)	Romary Rifka	Mexico	–	–	–	–	o	o	o	xo	o	xxo	o	o	o	xxx	1.95	
2nd place, silver medalist(s)	Nicole Forrester	Canada	–	–	–	–	–	–	o	xo	o	o	o	xo	xo	xxx	1.95	
3rd place, bronze medalist(s)	Levern Spencer	Saint Lucia	–	–	–	–	–	–	o	o	o	xxx					1.87	
4	Caterine Ibargüen	Colombia	–	–	–	–	xo	o	xxo	o	o	xxx					1.87	SB
5	Eliana da Silva	Brazil	–	–	–	o	o	o	o	o	xxx						1.84	
6	Juana Arrendel	Dominican Republic	–	–	–	–	o	o	o	xxx							1.81	
6	Sharon Day	United States	–	–	–	–	o	–	o	xxx							1.81	
8	Solange Witteveen	Argentina	–	–	–	o	o	o	xo	xxx							1.81	
9	Peaches Roach	Jamaica	–	–	–	o	o	o	xxx								1.78	
10	Fabiola Ayala	Mexico	–	–	–	–	o	xo	xxx								1.78	
11	Inika McPherson	United States	–	–	–	–	–	xxo	xx–	x							1.78	
12	Monica Freitas	Brazil	–	–	–	o	o	xxx									1.75	
13	Linda Louissanit	Haiti	–	–	–	o	xxx										1.70	
14	Michelle Williamson	Jamaica	–	–	xo	xxo	xxx										1.70	
15	Kay-de Vaughn	Belize	o	o	xxo	xxx											1.65	
