= 2012 African Championships in Athletics – Women's high jump =

The women's high jump at the 2012 African Championships in Athletics was held at the Stade Charles de Gaulle on 29 June.

== Medalists ==
Gold	Lissa Labiche; Seychelles
Silver	Anika Smit; South Africa
Bronze	Rhizlane Siba; Morocco

== Records ==
Standing records prior to the 2012 African Championships in Athletics
World record	Stefka Kostadinova (BUL)	2.09	Rome, Italy	30 August 1987
African record	Hestrie Cloete (RSA)	2.06	Paris Saint-Denis, France	31 August 2003
Championship record	Lucienne N'Da (CIV)	1.95	Mauritius	28 June 1992
Championship record	Hestrie Cloete (RSA)	1.95	Radès, Tunisia	7 August 2002

== Schedule ==
Date	Time	Round
29 June 2012	16:00	Final

== Results ==
=== Final ===
Rank	Athlete	Nationality	1.60	1.65	1.70	1.75	1.80	1.83	1.86	1.89	Result	Notes
1st place, gold medalist(s)	Lissa Labiche	Seychelles	–	–	–	o	o	–	o	xxx	1.86	NR
2nd place, silver medalist(s)	Anika Smit	South Africa	–	–	o	o	o	–	xo	xxx	1.86	
3rd place, bronze medalist(s)	Rhizlane Siba	Morocco	–	o	o	o	xxx				1.75	
4	Doreen Amata	Nigeria	–	–	–	xo	xxx				1.75	
5	Basant Ibrahim	Egypt	o	o	xo	xxo	xxx				1.75	
	Lisette Kouleni	Benin	xxx								NM	
	Odile Sanou	Burkina Faso									DNS	
	Selloane Tsoaeli	Lesotho									DNS	
