= Nneka Ukuh =

Nigerian high jumper

Personal information
- Born: November 20, 1987 (age 38)
Medal record
Women's athletics
Representing Nigeria
All-Africa Games
Gold medal – first place	2003 Abuja	High Jump
African Championships
Silver medal – second place	2006 Bambous	High jump

Nneka Ukuh (born November 20, 1987) is a female track and field athlete from Nigeria. She specialised in the high jump event, and is best known for winning the gold medal for her native West African country at the 2003 All-Africa Games.

== Competition record ==
Year	Competition	Venue	Position	Notes
Representing Nigeria
2003	All-Africa Games	Abuja, Nigeria	1st	1.84 m
2003	Afro-Asian Games	Hyderabad, India	7th	1.70 m
2006	African Championships	Bambous, Mauritius	2nd	1.80 m
2007	All-Africa Games	Algiers, Algeria	5th	1.79 m
2008	African Championships	Addis Ababa, Ethiopia	4th	1.75 m
