= Rene van der Merwe =

South African high jumper

Medal record

Women's athletics

Representing South Africa

African Championships
Gold medal – first place	2006 Bambous	High jump

Rene van der Merwe (born 15 June 1986) is a South African female high jumper. She was the gold medallist at the 2006 African Championships in Athletics, extending her country's success in the event from Hestrie Cloete. She went on to compete for Africa at the 2006 IAAF World Cup. The following year, she was fourth at the 2007 All-Africa Games.

She also represented her country at the 2009 Summer Universiade, where she set her personal best height of 1.85 m (6 ft 3/4 in).

== International competitions ==
Year	Competition	Venue	Position	Event	Notes
2006	African Championships	Bambous, Mauritius	1st	High jump	1.84 m
2006	IAAF World Cup	Athens, Greece	7th	High jump	1.83 m
2007	All-Africa Games	Algiers, Algeria	4th	High jump	1.83 m
2009	Universiade	Belgrade, Serbia	11th	High jump	1.85 m
