= Erika Seyama =

Swazi high jumper

Erika Nonhlanhla Seyama
Personal information
- Born: 19 January 1994 (age 32) Lubombo, Swaziland
- Education: Tshwane University of Technology
- Height: 1.64 m (5 ft 5 in)
- Weight: 52 kg (115 lb)

Sport
- Sport: Athletics
- Event: High jump
Medal record
Women's athletics
Representing Eswatini
African Championships
Gold medal – first place	2018 Asaba	High jump

Erika Nonhlanhla Seyama (born 19 January 1994) is a Swazi athlete specialising in the high jump. She won a gold medal at the 2018 African Championships in Asaba.

Her personal best is 1.83 metres set in Asaba in 2018.

== Competition record ==
Year	Competition	Venue	Position	Event	Notes
Representing Eswatini
2016	African Championships	Durban, South Africa	11th	High jump	1.65 m
2017	Universiade	Taipei, Taiwan	14th (q)	High jump	1.70 m
2018	Commonwealth Games	Gold Coast, Australia	13th	High jump	1.70 m
2018	African Championships	Asaba, Nigeria	1st	High jump	1.83 m
2019	World Championships	Doha, Qatar	29th (q)	High jump	1.70 m
