= Athletics at the 1999 Pan American Games – Women's high jump =

Women's high jump at the Pan American Games

The women's high jump event at the 1999 Pan American Games was held on July 30. Juana Arrendel of the Dominican Republic had originally won the competition with a 1.93 metres jump but later tested positive for an illegal substance, stanozolol, and was stripped of her medal.

== Results ==
Rank	Name	Nationality	1.65	1.70	1.75	1.80	1.85	1.88	1.91	1.93	Result	Notes
~~1~~	Juana Arrendel	Dominican Republic									~~1.93~~	DQ
1st place, gold medalist(s)	Solange Witteveen	Argentina	–	–	o	o	xxo	o	xxx		1.88	
2nd place, silver medalist(s)	Luciane Dambacher	Brazil	–	o	o	o	xo	xxx			1.85	
3rd place, bronze medalist(s)	Nicole Forrester	Canada	–	–	o	o	xxo	xxx			1.85	
4	Angela Spangler	United States	–	–	o	o	xxx				1.80	
5	Karol Jenkins	United States	–	–	xo	xxo	xxx				1.80	
6	Karen Beautle	Jamaica	o	o	o	xxx					1.75	
	Natasha Gibson	Trinidad and Tobago									DNS	
