= Erika Furlani =

Italian high jumper (born 1996)

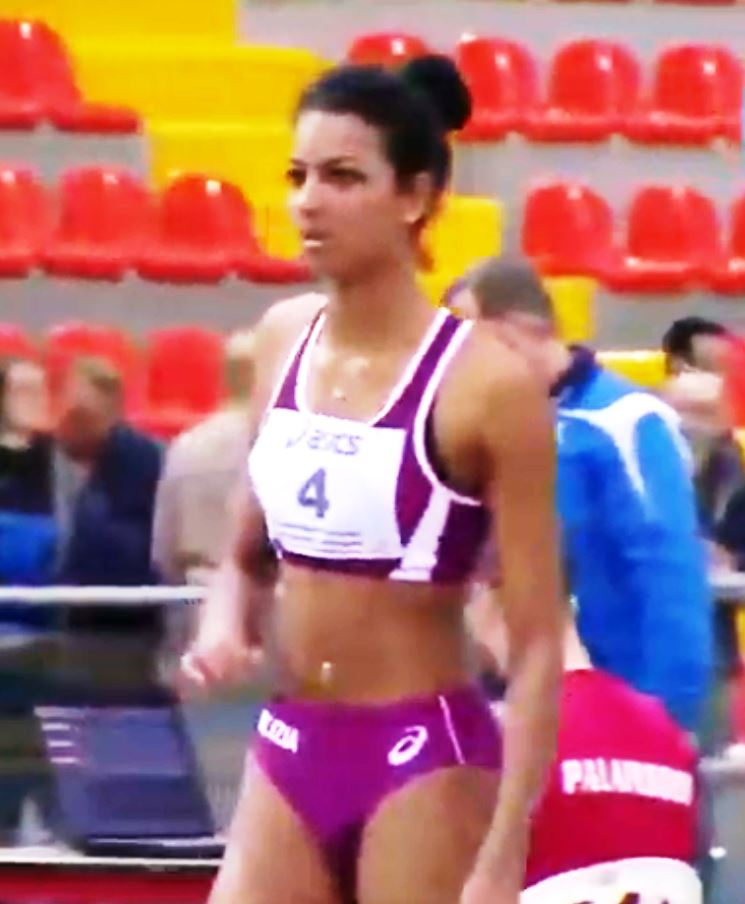
- Furlani in 2018.

Personal information
- Nationality: Italian
- Born: 2 January 1996 (age 30) Marino, Italy
- Height: 1.75 m (5 ft 9 in)
- Weight: 53 kg (117 lb)

Sport
- Country: Italy
- Sport: Athletics
- Event: High jump
- Club: G.S. Fiamme Oro
- Coached by: Marcello Furlani

Achievements and titles
- Personal bests: H. jump outdoor: 1.94 m (2020); H. jump indoor: 1.90 m (2017)

Erika Furlani (born 2 January 1996) is an Italian female high jumper.

== Biography ==
She was born from the Italian former high jumper Marcello Furlani, her coach, and Senegalese mother. She is the sister of the high jumper and long jumper Mattia Furlani.

== Achievements ==
Year	Competition	Venue	Position	Event	Measure	Notes
2013	World Youth Championships	(Ukraine) Donetsk	2nd	High jump	1.82 m	
2013	Gymnasiade	(Brazil) Brasília	2nd	High jump	1.80 m	
2014	European Team Championships	(Germany) Braunschweig	9th	High jump	1.83 m	
2014	World Junior Championships	(United States) Eugene	7th	High jump	1.85 m	
2016	European Championships	(Netherlands) Amsterdam	16th	High jump	1.85 m	
2017	European Indoor Championships	(Serbia) Belgrade	9th	High jump	1.86 m	

== National titles ==
- 1 win in the long jump (2017)

== See also ==
- Italian all-time lists - High jump
