= 2008 African Championships in Athletics – Women's high jump =

The women's high jump event at the 2008 African Championships in Athletics was held at the Addis Ababa Stadium on May 2.

== Results ==
Rank	Athlete	Nationality	1.60	1.65	1.70	1.75	1.80	1.84	1.88	1.91	Result	Notes
1st place, gold medalist(s)	Anika Smit	South Africa	–	–	o	o	o	o	xo	xxx	1.88	
2nd place, silver medalist(s)	Marcoleen Pretorius	South Africa	–	–	o	o	o	xo	xxx		1.84	
3rd place, bronze medalist(s)	Marizca Gertenbach	South Africa	–	–	o	o	o	xxo	xxx		1.84	
4	Nneka Ukuh	Nigeria	–	o	o	o	xxx				1.75	
5	Rim Abdullah	Egypt	o	o	xxo	o	xxx				1.75	NR
6	Karima Ben Othmani	Tunisia	–	o	xxx						1.65	
7	Josée Nguea	Cameroon	xo	o	xxx						1.65	
	Doreen Amata	Nigeria	–	–	–	xxx					NM	
