= Athletics at the 2011 Summer Universiade – Women's high jump =

The women's high jump event at the 2011 Summer Universiade was held on 19–21 August.

== Medalists ==
Gold	Silver	Bronze
Brigetta Barrett; United States	Airinė Palšytė; Lithuania	Anna Iljuštšenko; Estonia

== Results ==
=== Qualification ===
Qualification: 1.91 m (Q) or at least 12 best (q) qualified for the final.

Rank	Group	Athlete	Nationality	1.70	1.75	1.80	Result	Notes
1	A	Karolina Błażej	Poland	–	o	o	1.80	q
1	A	Anna Iljuštšenko	Estonia	–	–	o	1.80	q
1	A	Oldřiška Marešová	Czech Republic	o	o	o	1.80	q
1	A	Anna Ustinova	Kazakhstan	–	o	o	1.80	q
1	B	Brigetta Barrett	United States	–	o	o	1.80	q
1	B	Irina Gordeeva	Russia	–	–	o	1.80	q
1	B	Airinė Palšytė	Lithuania	o	o	o	1.80	q
8	A	Wanida Boonwan	Thailand	o	o	xo	1.80	q
8	A	Oksana Okuneva	Ukraine	–	o	xo	1.80	q
8	B	Magdalena Ogrodnik	Poland	–	o	xo	1.80	q
11	B	Ye Jiaying	China	o	xo	xo	1.80	q
12	A	Ana Šimić	Croatia	–	–	xxo	1.80	q
12	A	Hanne van Hessche	Belgium	o	o	xxo	1.80	q
14	A	Ellen Björklund	Sweden	o	o	xxx	1.75	
14	A	Jillian Drouin	Canada	o	o	xxx	1.75	
16	B	Melanie Bauschke	Germany	xo	o	xxx	1.75	
17	B	Fabiola Ayala	Mexico	o	xxo	xxx	1.75	
17	B	Danielle Frenkel	Israel	–	xxo	xxx	1.75	
19	B	Holly Parent	Canada	xo	xxo	xxx	1.75	
20	A	Kashany Rios	Panama	o	xxx		1.70	
	B	Thabo Muswere	Botswana	xxx			NM	
	B	Thelma Zvavamwe	Zimbabwe	xxx			NM	

=== Final ===
Rank	Athlete	Nationality	1.70	1.75	1.78	1.81	1.84	1.86	1.88	1.90	1.92	1.94	1.96	1.98	Result	Notes
1st place, gold medalist(s)	Brigetta Barrett	United States	–	o	o	–	o	–	o	o	o	xo	o	xxx	1.96	PB
2nd place, silver medalist(s)	Airinė Palšytė	Lithuania	o	o	–	o	xo	xo	xo	o	o	xxo	xxo	xxx	1.96	=NR
3rd place, bronze medalist(s)	Anna Iljuštšenko	Estonia	–	–	–	o	–	o	xxo	–	o	o	xxx		1.94	
4	Irina Gordeeva	Russia	–	–	o	o	xo	o	xxx						1.86	
5	Magdalena Ogrodnik	Poland	–	o	o	o	xxo	o	xxx						1.86	
6	Oldřiška Marešová	Czech Republic	–	o	xo	o	xo	xo	xxx						1.86	
7	Wanida Boonwan	Thailand	o	o	o	xo	o	xxo	xxx						1.86	
8	Karolina Błażej	Poland	–	o	o	o	o	xxx							1.84	
8	Oksana Okuneva	Ukraine	–	–	o	o	o	–	xxx						1.84	
10	Anna Ustinova	Kazakhstan	–	–	o	o	xo	xxx							1.84	
11	Ana Šimić	Croatia	–	–	xo	o	xxx								1.81	
12	Ye Jiaying	China	o	o	o	xxx									1.78	
13	Hanne van Hessche	Belgium	o	o	xxo	xxx									1.78	
