= Alena Ivanova =

Kazakhstani volleyball player (born 1989)

Personal information
- Nationality: Kazakhstani
- Born: 19 June 1989 (age 37)
- Height: 195 cm (77 in)
- Weight: 78 kg (172 lb)
- Spike: 310 cm (122 in)
- Block: 300 cm (118 in)

Volleyball information
- Number: 7 (national team)

Career
- Years: Team
- 2014: Zhetyssu

National team
- Years: Team
- 2014: Kazakhstan

Alena Ivanova (née Omelchenko; born 19 June 1989) is a Kazakhstani volleyball player. She is part of the Kazakhstan women's national volleyball team.

She participated in the 2010 FIVB Volleyball Women's World Championship, and the 2014 FIVB Volleyball World Grand Prix. On club level she played for Zhetyssu in 2014.
