= Petrina Price =

Australian high jumper

Personal information
- Nationality: Australian
- Born: 9 October 1984 (age 41) Brisbane, Queensland, Australia

Sport
- Sport: Athletics
- Event: High jump

Petrina Price (born 26 April 1984) is an Australian high jumper.

Price was born in Greenacre. In the age-specific categories she finished seventh at the 2000 World Junior Championships, won the silver medal at the 2001 World Youth Championships and the bronze medal at the 2002 World Junior Championships.

In senior competitions, she finished sixth at the 2002 Commonwealth Games and ninth at the 2006 Commonwealth Games. She also competed at the 2004 IAAF World Indoor Championships, the 2004 Olympic Games, the 2009 World Championships and the 2010 World Indoor Championships without reaching the final.

Her personal best jump is 1.94 metres, achieved in August 2009 in Cottbus. She won the Australian Championships five times, in 2002, 2003, 2004, 2009 and 2010.
