= Anna Iljuštšenko =

Estonian high jumper

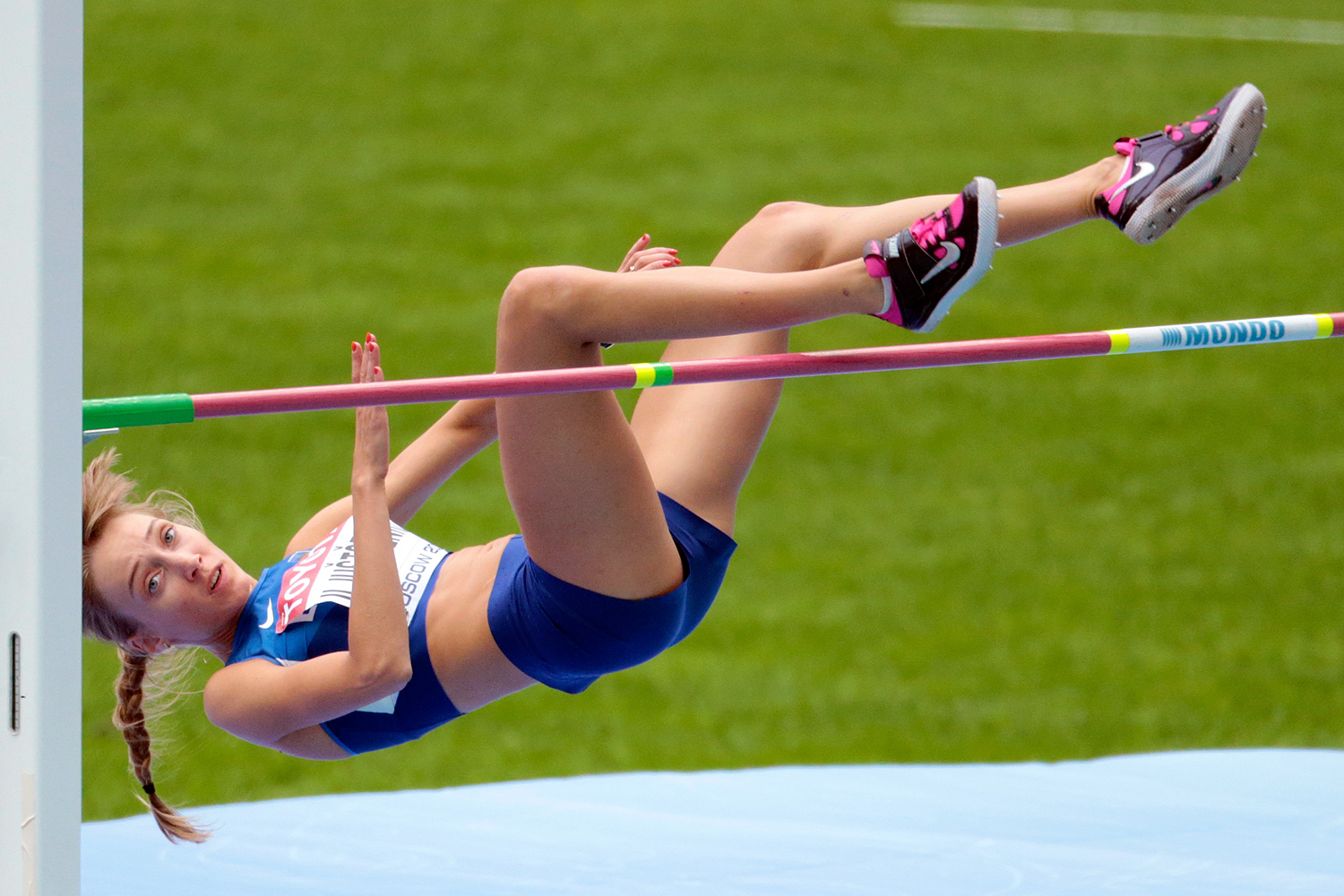

Personal information
- Born: 12 October 1985 (age 40) Sillamäe, then part of Estonian SSR, Soviet Union
- Height: 1.68 m (5 ft 6 in)

Sport
- Country: Estonia
- Coached by: Gaspar Epro

Achievements and titles
- Personal bests: High jump (outdoor): 1.96 m (NR); High jump (indoor): 1.94 m (NR)
Medal record
Women's athletics
Representing Estonia
Universiade
Bronze medal – third place	2011 Shenzhen	High jump
Bronze medal – third place	2013 Kazan	High jump

Anna Iljuštšenko (born 12 October 1985 in Sillamäe) is an Estonian high jumper.

== Biography ==
She finished ninth at the 2007 Summer Universiade with a jump of 1.80 metres. She competed at the 2004 World Junior Championships (result 1.75 m), the 2006 European Championships (result 1.87 m), the 2008 Olympic Games (result 1.89 m), the 2009 European Indoor Championships (result 1.85 m), the 2009 World Championships (result 1.89 m) and the 2010 World Indoor Championships (result 1.89 m) and 2011 European Indoor Championships (result 1.89 m) without reaching the final round. On several of these and the other occasions where she failed to reach the finals, she missed out due to countback.

She reached the final of the 2011 World Championships, finishing in 12th place with a jump of 1.89 m, and also the final of the 2010 European Championships, finishing in 11th place with a jump of 1.85 m.

Following that however, she failed to reach the final in the 2012 World Indoor Championships (result 1.88 m), the 2012 Summer Olympics (result 1.90 m), the 2012 European Championships (result 1.87 m), the 2013 World Championships (result 1.88 m) and the 2014 World Indoor Championships (result 1.88 m).

She reached the final of the 2013 European Indoor Championships, narrowly missing out on a medal and finishing in 4th place with a jump of 1.92 m.

Her personal best jump is 1.96 metres, achieved on 9 August 2011 in Viljandi, Estonia (national record). Her indoor best is 1.94, achieved on 2 February 2013 in Arnstadt, Germany (national record). Her trainer for a long time was Martin Kutman.

== Competition record ==
Year	Competition	Venue	Position	Result
Representing Estonia
2004	World Junior Championships	Grosseto, Italy	15th	1.75 m
2005	European U23 Championships	Erfurt, Germany	11th	1.70 m
2006	European Championships	Gothenburg, Sweden	20th (q)	1.87 m
2007	European U23 Championships	Debrecen, Hungary	13th (q)	1.81 m
2007	Universiade	Bangkok, Thailand	9th	1.80 m
2008	Olympic Games	Beijing, China	21st (q)	1.89 m
2009	European Indoor Championships	Torino, Italy	10th (q)	1.85 m
2009	Universiade	Belgrade, Serbia	5th	1.88 m
2009	World Championships	Berlin, Germany	17th (q)	1.89 m
2010	World Indoor Championships	Doha, Qatar	10th (q)	1.89 m
2010	European Championships	Barcelona, Spain	11th	1.85 m
2011	European Indoor Championships	Paris, France	13th (q)	1.89 m
2011	Universiade	Shenzhen, China	3rd	1.94 m
2011	World Championships	Daegu, South Korea	11th	1.89 m
2012	World Indoor Championships	Istanbul, Turkey	12th (q)	1.88 m
2012	European Championships	Helsinki, Finland	13th (q)	1.87 m
2012	Olympic Games	London, United Kingdom	15th (q)	1.90 m
2013	European Indoor Championships	Gothenburg, Sweden	4th	1.92 m
2013	Universiade	Kazan, Russia	3rd	1.94 m
2013	World Championships	Moscow, Russia	16th (q)	1.88 m
2014	World Indoor Championships	Sopot, Poland	15th (q)	1.88 m
2016	European Championships	Amsterdam, Netherlands	23rd (q)	1.80 m
