= Rhizlane Siba =

Moroccan high jumper (born 1996)

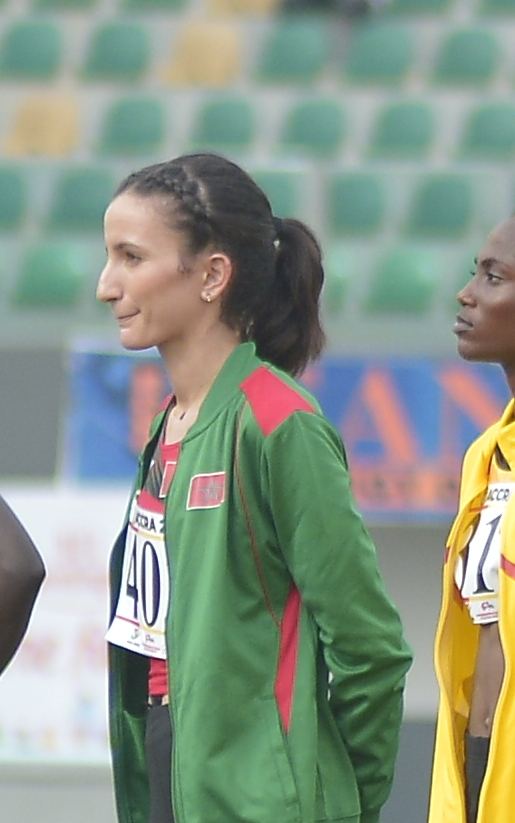

Medal record

Women's athletics

Representing Morocco

Pan Arab Games
Gold medal – first place	2011 Doha	High jump

African Championships
Gold medal – first place	2014 Marrakesh	High jump
Bronze medal – third place	2012 Porto-Novo	High jump

Arab Championships
Gold medal – first place	2013 Doha	High jump
Gold medal – first place	2011 Al Ain	High jump
Silver medal – second place	2015 Isa Town	High jump

Rhizlane Siba (born 29 February 1996) is a Moroccan track and field athlete who competes in the high jump. She has been African champion at youth, junior and senior level, winning the main continental title at the 2014 African Championships in Athletics. She is also twice gold medallist at the Arab Athletics Championships (winning her first at age fifteen) and was the 2011 Pan Arab Games winner. Her personal best of 1.83 m (6 ft 0 in) is the Moroccan record.

The daughter of Ahmed and Aicha Siba, she grew up with her two siblings, Zineb and Amin. She gained a scholarship to attend Kansas State University and study business administration. While there she competed for the Kansas State Wildcats and made the top six at the Big 12 Conference Championships.

== International competitions ==
Year	Competition	Venue	Position	Event	Notes
2011	Arab Championships	Al Ain, United Arab Emirates	1st	High jump	1.76 m
2011	Pan Arab Games	Doha, Qatar	1st	High jump	1.76 m
2012	African Championships	Porto-Novo, Benin	3rd	High jump	1.75 m
2013	African Youth Championships	Warri, Nigeria	1st	High jump	1.80 m
2013	African Youth Championships	Warri, Nigeria	3rd	Medley relay	2:23.83
2013	Arab Championships	Doha, Qatar	1st	High jump	1.76 m
2013	World Youth Championships	Donetsk, Ukraine	3rd	High jump	1.79 m
2013	African Junior Championships	Bambous, Mauritius	1st	High jump	1.75 m
2014	World Junior Championships	Eugene, United States	20th (q)	High jump	1.79 m
2014	African Championships	Marrakesh, Morocco	1st	High jump	1.80 m
2014	Continental Cup	Marrakesh, Morocco	6th	High jump	1.79 m
2015	African Junior Championships	Addis Ababa, Ethiopia	3rd	High jump	1.75 m
2015	Arab Championships	Isa Town, Bahrain	2nd	High jump	1.75 m
2016	African Championships	Durban, South Africa	5th	High jump	1.73 m
2019	African Games	Rabat, Morocco	2nd	High jump	1.81 m
2021	Arab Championships	Radès, Tunisia	1st	High jump	1.84 m
2022	African Championships	Port Louis, Mauritius	4th	High jump	1.76 m
2022	Mediterranean Games	Oran, Algeria	5th	High jump	1.84 m
2022	Islamic Solidarity Games	Konya, Turkey	5th	High jump	1.82 m
2023	Arab Championships	Marrakesh, Morocco	1st	High jump	1.78 m
2023	Arab Games	Oran, Algeria	2nd	High jump	1.75 m
2023	Jeux de la Francophonie	Kinshasa, DR Congo	3rd	High jump	1.73 m
