= Julie Crane =

British athlete (born 1976)

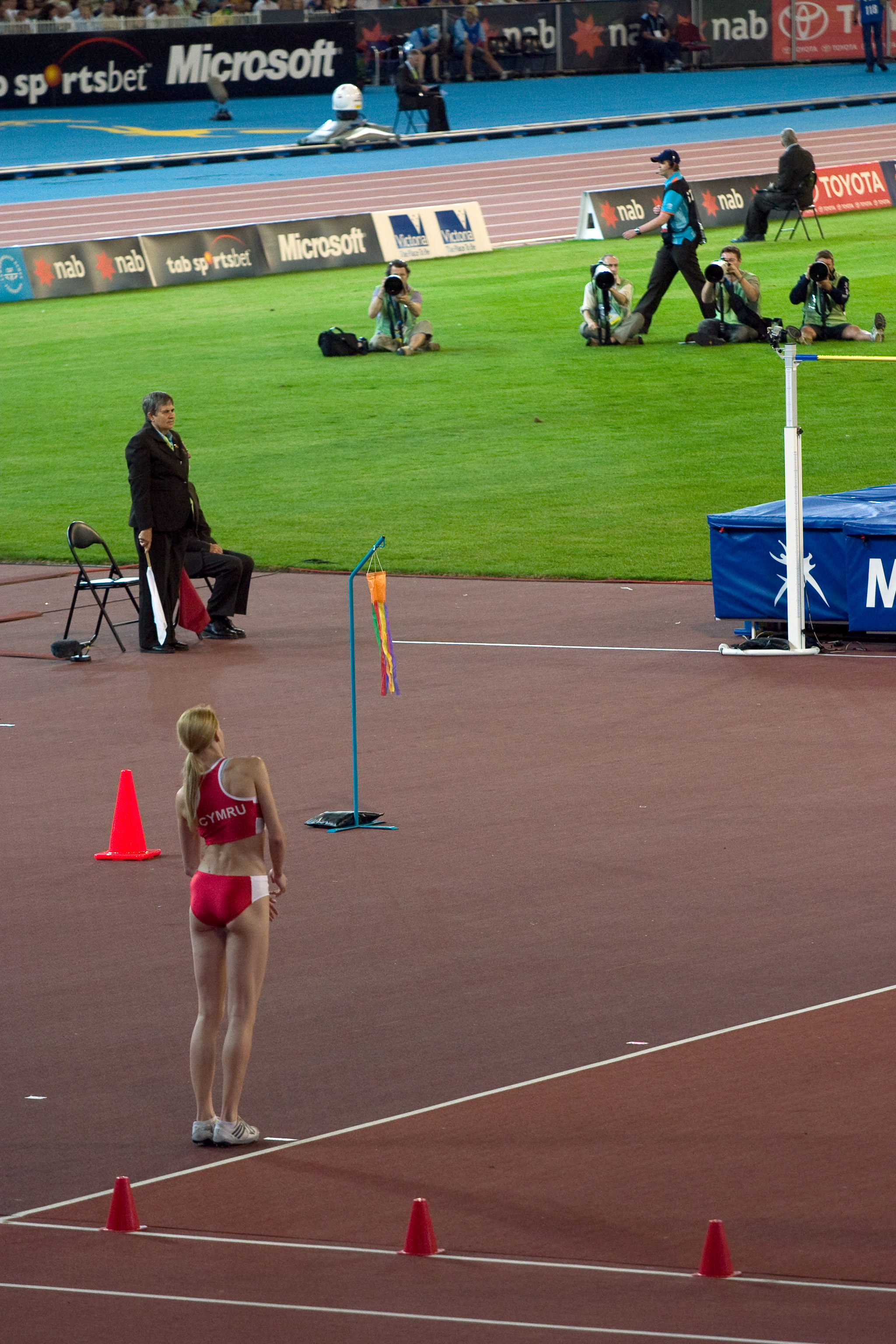
- Crane preparing to jump at the 2006 Commonwealth Games

Personal information
- Nationality: British (Welsh)
- Born: 26 September 1976 (age 49)
- Height: 177 cm (5 ft 10 in)
- Weight: 59 kg (130 lb)

Sport
- Sport: Athletics
- Event: high jump
- Club: Sale Harriers
Medal record
Representing Wales
Athletics
Commonwealth Games
Silver medal – second place	2006 Melbourne	high jump

Julie Crane (born 26 September 1976) is a British and Welsh former track and field athlete who specialised in the high jump. She won a silver medal at the 2006 Commonwealth Games.

== Biography ==
Crane was born in Nottingham but represented Wales and Sale Harriers. Crane graduated from the University of Birmingham with an MSc in Mathematical Sciences in 1999.

She won a silver medal representing Wales in the women's high jump event at the 2006 Commonwealth Games. She had previously represented Wales at the 1998 Commonwealth Games in Kuala Lumpur, Malaysia, and the 2002 Commonwealth Games in Manchester, England.

Crane was the Welsh record holder for both indoor and outdoor high jump and represented Great Britain at the 2005 European Athletics Indoor Championships – Women's high jump.

Crane suffered back problems following a car crash in 2004 but continued to compete and reached the podium of the British AAA Championships on four occasions in 2002, 2003, 2004 and 2006.

Crane announced her retirement from athletics due to injury in 2010.
