= Øyunn Grindem Mogstad =

Norwegian high jumper (1987–2025)

Personal information
- Born: 11 November 1987
- Died: 11 April 2025 (aged 37)

Sport
- Country: Norway
- Club: IL Sandvin; IK Tjalve
- Coached by: Dan Simion

Achievements and titles
- Personal best: High jump: 1.90 m

Øyunn Grindem Mogstad (11 November 1987 – 11 April 2025) was a Norwegian high jumper.

== Biography ==
Grindem Mogstad became three times national indoor champion in the high jump. At the national outdoor championships she won two silver medals in the high jump. With a personal best jump of 1.90 meters, she was the fifth best Norwegian high jumper ever.

She represented her country at international competitions. As a junior she competed at the 2006 World Junior Championships in Athletics and later at the 2007 European Athletics U23 Championships and 2009 European Athletics U23 Championships. She made her international senior debut at the 2011 European Athletics Indoor Championships. The next year at the 2012 European Athletics Championships she just missed the final finishing 13th overall. The same year she finished 6th at the 2012 Diamond League meeting in Oslo.

Grindem Mogstad died from a brain tumour on 11 April 2025, at the age of 37.
