= 2009 European Athletics Indoor Championships – Women's high jump =

The Women's high jump event at the 2009 European Athletics Indoor Championships was held on March 7–8.

== Medalists ==
Gold	Silver	Bronze
Ariane Friedrich; Germany	Ruth Beitia; Spain	Viktoriya Klyugina; Russia

== Results ==
=== Qualification ===
Qualification Performance: 1.94 (Q) or at least 8 best performers advanced to the final.

Rank	Athlete	Nationality	1.70	1.75	1.80	1.85	1.89	Result	Notes
1	Ariane Friedrich	Germany	–	–	–	–	o	1.89	q
1	Blanka Vlašić	Croatia	–	–	–	o	o	1.89	q
1	Iva Straková	Czech Republic	–	–	o	o	o	1.89	q
1	Viktoriya Klyugina	Russia	–	–	o	o	o	1.89	q
5	Irina Gordeyeva	Russia	–	–	o	xo	o	1.89	q
5	Svetlana Shkolina	Russia	–	–	o	xo	o	1.89	q
7	Kamila Stepaniuk	Poland	–	o	o	o	xo	1.89	q
8	Meike Kröger	Germany	–	o	o	o	xxx	1.85	q
8	Ruth Beitia	Spain	–	–	–	o	xxx	1.85	q
10	Anna Iljuštšenko	Estonia	–	–	o	xo	xxx	1.85	
10	Deirdre Ryan	Ireland	–	o	o	xo	xxx	1.85	
12	Adonia Steryiou	Greece	–	o	xo	xo	xxx	1.85	
13	Stine Kufaas	Norway	–	o	o	xxx		1.80	
14	Esthera Petre	Romania	xo	o	xo	xxx		1.80	
15	Ma'ayan Foreman	Israel	o	o	xxx			1.80	
	Antonietta Di Martino	Italy						DNS	

=== Final ===
Rank	Athlete	Nationality	1.82	1.87	1.92	1.96	1.99	2.01	2.03	Result	Notes
1st place, gold medalist(s)	Ariane Friedrich	Germany	–	–	o	–	xo	o	x–	2.01	
2nd place, silver medalist(s)	Ruth Beitia	Spain	–	o	–	o	o	x–	xx	1.99	SB
3rd place, bronze medalist(s)	Viktoriya Klyugina	Russia	o	o	o	o	xxx			1.96	
4	Svetlana Shkolina	Russia	o	o	o	xxo	xxx			1.96	
5	Blanka Vlašić	Croatia	–	o	o	xxx				1.92	
5	Irina Gordeyeva	Russia	o	o	o	xxx				1.92	
7	Iva Straková	Czech Republic	o	o	xo	xxx				1.92	
8	Kamila Stepaniuk	Poland	o	o	xxo	xxx				1.92	
	Meike Kröger	Germany								DNS	
