= 2011 World Championships in Athletics – Women's high jump =

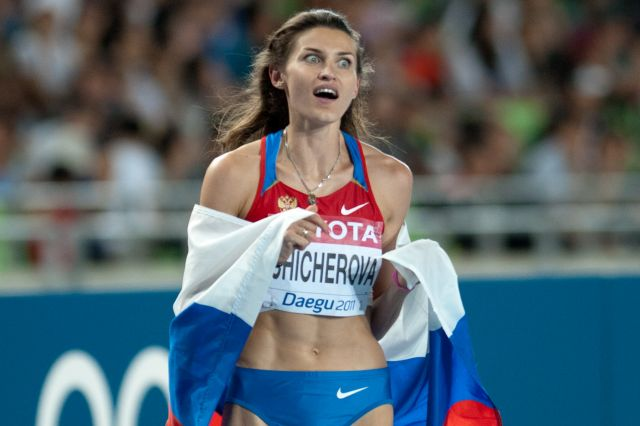
Anna Chicherova celebrating her win in Daegu

The Women's high jump event at the 2011 World Championships in Athletics was held at the Daegu Stadium on September 1 and 3.

Russia's Anna Chicherova entered the competition as the favourite with a world leading jump of 2.07 m. Although Blanka Vlašić had won world titles in 2007 and 2009 and was ranked second in the world, she was suffering from a leg injury and decided to compete after having initially withdrawn. Antonietta Di Martino had been the only other woman over 2.00 m that year. Emma Green, Venelina Veneva-Mateeva, 2004 Olympic champion Yelena Slesarenko and Ruth Beitia were the other established entrants, while Svetlana Shkolina was fourth in the world rankings. Chaunté Lowe, Ariane Friedrich and reigning Olympic champion Tia Hellebaut were notable absences. It took 1.95 to make the final.

The medalists clearly separated from the field in order, each clearing 2.00 Chicherova on her first, Vlašić on her second and Di Martino on her third. At 2.03 Chicherova remained clean while Vlašić again needed two attempts, with Di Martino unable to make the height. At 2.05, neither was able to make it, though Vlašić looked closer. After years of finishing one place behind Vlašić in major meets, it was the first time Chicherova was able to reverse those results.

== Medalists ==
Gold	Silver	Bronze
Anna Chicherova; Russia	Blanka Vlašić; Croatia	Antonietta Di Martino; Italy

== Records ==
World record	Stefka Kostadinova (BUL)	2.09	Rome, Italy	30 August 1987
Championship record	Stefka Kostadinova (BUL)	2.09	Rome, Italy	30 August 1987
World leading	Anna Chicherova (RUS)	2.07	Cheboksary, Russia	22 July 2011
African record	Hestrie Cloete (RSA)	2.06	Paris, France	31 August 2003
Asian record	Marina Aitova (KAZ)	1.99	Athens, Greece	13 July 2009
North, Central American and Caribbean record	Chaunté Howard Lowe (USA)	2.05	Des Moines, IA, United States	26 June 2010
South American record	Solange Witteveen (ARG)	1.96	Oristano, Italy	8 September 1997
European record	Stefka Kostadinova (BUL)	2.09	Rome, Italy	30 August 1987
Oceanian record	Vanessa Browne-Ward (AUS)	1.98	Perth, Australia	12 February 1989
Oceanian record	Alison Inverarity (AUS)	1.98	Ingolstadt, Germany	17 July 1994

== Qualification standards ==
A standard	B standard
1.95	1.92

== Schedule ==
Date	Time	Round
September 1, 2011	10:45	Qualification
September 3, 2011	19:00	Final

== Results ==
=== Qualification ===
Qualification: Qualifying Performance 1.95 (Q) or at least 12 best performers (q) advance to the final.

Rank	Group	Name	Nationality	1.75	1.80	1.85	1.89	1.92	1.95	Result	Notes
1	B	Brigetta Barrett	United States	o	o	o	o	o	o	1.95	Q
1	A	Anna Chicherova	Russia	–	–	o	o	o	o	1.95	Q
1	B	Antonietta Di Martino	Italy	–	o	o	o	o	o	1.95	Q
1	B	Blanka Vlašić	Croatia	–	–	o	o	o	o	1.95	Q
5	A	Emma Green Tregaro	Sweden	–	–	o	o	o	xo	1.95	Q, SB
5	A	Svetlana Shkolina	Russia	–	–	o	o	o	xo	1.95	Q
7	B	Doreen Amata	Nigeria	–	–	o	o	xxo	xo	1.95	Q, =NR
7	A	Deirdre Ryan	Ireland	–	o	o	o	xxo	xo	1.95	Q, NR
9	B	Svetlana Radzivil	Uzbekistan	–	o	o	o	o	xxo	1.95	Q, SB
9	B	Yelena Slesarenko	Russia	–	o	o	o	o	xxo	1.95	Q
9	B	Zheng Xingjuan	China	–	o	o	o	o	xxo	1.95	Q, PB
12	A	Anna Iljuštšenko	Estonia	–	xo	o	xo	xo	xxo	1.95	Q
13	A	Levern Spencer	Saint Lucia	–	o	o	o	o	xxx	1.92	
14	B	Esthera Petre	Romania	o	o	o	xo	o	xxx	1.92	
15	A	Melanie Melfort	France	–	o	xo	xo	o	xxx	1.92	
16	A	Ruth Beitia	Spain	–	o	o	o	xo	xxx	1.92	
17	B	Ebba Jungmark	Sweden	–	o	o	xo	xo	xxx	1.92	
18	A	Vita Styopina	Ukraine	o	o	o	o	xxo	xxx	1.92	
19	B	Marina Aitova	Kazakhstan	–	o	o	o	xxx		1.89	
19	B	Oksana Okuneva	Ukraine	–	o	o	o	xxx		1.89	
21	A	Venelina Veneva-Mateeva	Bulgaria	–	o	xo	o	xxx		1.89	
22	B	Wanida Boonwan	Thailand	o	o	o	xxx			1.85	
23	A	Tonje Angelsen	Norway	o	xo	o	xxx			1.85	
24	B	Danielle Frenkel	Israel	o	xxo	o	xxx			1.85	
25	A	Raffaella Lamera	Italy	–	o	xxo	xxx			1.85	
25	A	Marielys Rojas	Venezuela	o	o	xxo	xxx			1.85	SB
27	A	Inika McPherson	United States	o	o	xxx				1.80	
28	B	Marija Vuković	Montenegro	o	xo	xxx				1.80	
29	A	Han Da-rye	South Korea	xo	xxx					1.75	

=== Final ===
Rank	Name	Nationality	1.89	1.93	1.97	2.00	2.03	2.05	Result	Notes
1st place, gold medalist(s)	Anna Chicherova	Russia	o	o	o	o	o	xxx	2.03	
2nd place, silver medalist(s)	Blanka Vlašić	Croatia	o	o	o	xo	xo	xxx	2.03	SB
3rd place, bronze medalist(s)	Antonietta Di Martino	Italy	o	o	o	xxo	xxx		2.00	=SB
4	Yelena Slesarenko	Russia	o	xo	o	xxx			1.97	=SB
5	Svetlana Shkolina	Russia	o	o	xxo	xxx			1.97	
6	Zheng Xingjuan	China	xo	o	xxx				1.93	
6	Deirdre Ryan	Ireland	xo	o	xxx				1.93	
8	Svetlana Radzivil	Uzbekistan	xo	xo	xxx				1.93	
8	Doreen Amata	Nigeria	xo	xo	xxx				1.93	
10	Brigetta Barrett	United States	o	xxo	xxx				1.93	
11	Emma Green Tregaro	Sweden	o	xxx					1.89	
12	Anna Iljuštšenko	Estonia	xo	xxx					1.89	
