= 2010 European Athletics Championships – Women's high jump =

Women's high jump at the European Athletics Championships

The women's high jump at the 2010 European Athletics Championships was held at the Estadi Olímpic Lluís Companys on 30 July and 1 August.

== Medalists ==
Gold	Blanka Vlašić; Croatia (CRO)
Silver	Emma Green; Sweden (SWE)
Bronze	Ariane Friedrich; Germany (GER)

== Records ==
Standing records prior to the 2010 European Athletics Championships
World record	Stefka Kostadinova (BUL)	2.09	Rome, Italy	30 August 1987
European record	Stefka Kostadinova (BUL)	2.09	Rome, Italy	30 August 1987
Championship record	Tia Hellebaut (BEL)	2.03	Gothenburg, Sweden	11 August 2006
World Leading	Chaunté Howard Lowe (USA)	2.05	Des Moines, United States	26 July 2010
European Leading	Blanka Vlašić (CRO)	2.03	Rome, Italy	10 July 2010

== Schedule ==
Date	Time	Round
30 July 2010	10:05	Qualification
1 August 2010	19:30	Final

== Results ==
=== Qualification ===
Rank	Group	Athlete	Nationality	1.78	1.83	1.87	1.90	1.92	Result	Notes
1	A	Ruth Beitia	Spain	-	o	o	o	o	1.92	Q
1	A	Danielle Frenkel	Israel	o	o	o	o	o	1.92	Q, NR
1	B	Ariane Friedrich	Germany	-	-	-	o	o	1.92	Q
1	A	Svetlana Shkolina	Russia	-	o	o	o	o	1.92	Q
1	A	Blanka Vlašić	Croatia	-	-	o	o	o	1.92	Q
6	A	Anna Iljuštšenko	Estonia	o	o	o	xo	o	1.92	Q, =NR
6	A	Beatrice Lundmark	Switzerland	o	o	o	xo	o	1.92	Q, PB
8	B	Antonia Stergiou	Greece	o	o	o	xxo	o	1.92	Q, SB
8	B	Viktoriya Styopina	Ukraine	-	xo	o	xo	o	1.92	Q
10	B	Emma Green	Sweden	-	-	o	-	xo	1.92	Q
11	B	Burcu Ayhan	Turkey	o	o	xo	xxo	xo	1.92	Q, PB
12	B	Tia Hellebaut	Belgium	-	o	o	xo	xxo	1.92	Q
13	B	Antonietta Di Martino	Italy	-	o	o	o	xxx	1.90	
13	B	Irina Gordeyeva	Russia	-	o	o	o	xxx	1.90	
15	A	Stine Kufaas	Norway	o	o	xxo	o	xxx	1.90	
15	B	Deirdre Ryan	Ireland	o	o	xxo	o	xxx	1.90	SB
17	A	Ebba Jungmark	Sweden	-	xo	o	xo	xxx	1.90	=SB
18	B	Airinė Palšytė	Lithuania	o	xxo	xo	xxo	xxx	1.90	
19	A	Raffaella Lamera	Italy	o	xo	o	xxx		1.87	
20	B	Tonje Angelsen	Norway	o	o	xo	xxx		1.87	
21	A	Marija Vuković	Montenegro	xo	o	xo	xxx		1.87	
22	B	Ana Šimić	Croatia	o	o	xxx			1.83	
22	A	Venelina Veneva-Mateeva	Bulgaria	-	o	xxx			1.83	
22	A	Georgiana Zarcan	Romania	o	o	xxx			1.83	
25	A	Hannelore Desmet	Belgium	o	xo	xxx			1.83	
26	B	Ma'ayan Foreman	Israel	o	xxx				1.78	

=== Final ===
Rank	Athlete	Nationality	1.80	1.85	1.89	1.92	1.95	1.97	1.99	2.01	2.03	2.05	Result	Notes
1st place, gold medalist(s)	Blanka Vlašić	Croatia	-	o	-	o	xo	xo	o	o	xo	x-	2.03	=CR, =EL
2nd place, silver medalist(s)	Emma Green	Sweden	-	-	xo	o	xo	o	xxo	xo	xxx		2.01	PB
3rd place, bronze medalist(s)	Ariane Friedrich	Germany	-	-	o	-	o	o	o	xxo	xxx		2.01	
4	Svetlana Shkolina	Russia	-	o	o	o	xo	xo	xxx				1.97	
5	Tia Hellebaut	Belgium	o	o	o	xo	xo	xxo	xxx				1.97	SB
6	Viktoriya Styopina	Ukraine	o	o	o	o	o	xxx					1.95	SB
6	Ruth Beitia	Spain	-	o	-	o	o	xxx					1.95	
8	Antonia Stergiou	Greece	o	o	o	xxo	xxx						1.92	=SB
9	Burcu Ayhan	Turkey	o	o	xo	xxo	xxx						1.92	=PB
10	Beatrice Lundmark	Switzerland	o	o	xxo	xxx							1.89	
11	Anna Iljuštšenko	Estonia	o	o	xxx								1.85	
12	Danielle Frenkel	Israel	o	xo	xxx								1.85	
