= Athletics at the 2012 Summer Olympics – Women's high jump =

Women's high jump at the Games of the XXX Olympiad
- Venue: Olympic Stadium
- Date: 9–11 August
- Competitors: 35 from 28 nations
- Winning height: 2.05

Medalists
1st place, gold medalist(s)		Anna Chicherova	Russia
2nd place, silver medalist(s)		Brigetta Barrett	United States
3rd place, bronze medalist(s)		Ruth Beitia	Spain

Official video highlights

The Women's high jump competition at the 2012 Summer Olympics in London, United Kingdom. The event was held at the Olympic Stadium on 9–11 August.

In the qualifying round, only four athletes attempted the automatic qualifying height of 1.96, the clearance necessary for Svetlana Radzivil to advance beyond two misses at 1.93 and while failing, Irina Gordeeva needed to cover her chances in case Ariane Friedrich or Antonia Stergiou had cleared it.

In the final, it was down to four athletes at 2 metres, in the process losing defending champion Tia Hellebaut and reigning indoor champion Chaunte Lowe. Ruth Beitia was clean at 2.00 with one earlier miss, but she could go no further. Brigetta Barrett was getting into a habit of clearing heights on her second attempt. But she also cleared 2.03 on her second attempt, while Svetlana Shkolina cleared on her third, putting Barrett in silver medal position and Shkolina in the bronze position. The leader was reigning world champion Anna Chicherova, clean through 2.03, which would have been enough for the gold medal. But the competition went on, all three attempting 2.05. Chicherova cleared on her second attempt while Barrett and Shkolina missed three times to settle the medals for sure.

Seven years after the competition, on 1 February 2019, Svetlana Shkolina was among twelve Russian track and field athletes found guilty of doping during the 2012 Summer Olympics, and was stripped of her bronze medal. In 2021, IOC reallocated her bronze medal to Ruth Beitia of Spain, the athlete who originally got fourth in the event.

In 2016, victorious Chicherova's 2008 drug re-test returned positive for dehydrochlormethyltestosterone (turinabol). Her 2008 bronze was rescinded, but 2012 gold was not affected.

== Competition format ==
The competition consisted of two rounds, qualification and final. Athletes start with a qualifying round. Jumping in turn, each athlete attempts to achieve the qualifying height. If they fail at three jumps in a row, they are eliminated. After a successful jump, they receive three more attempts to achieve the next height. Once all jumps have been completed, all athletes who have achieved the qualifying height go through to the final. If fewer than 12 athletes achieve the qualifying standard, the best 12 athletes go through. Cleared heights reset for the final, which followed the same format until all athletes fail three consecutive jumps.

== Schedule ==
All times are British Summer Time (UTC+1)

Date	Time	Round
Thursday, 9 August 2012	09:30	Qualifications
Saturday, 11 August 2012	19:00	Finals

== Records ==
Prior to the competition, the existing world record, Olympic record, and world leading jump were as follows:

World record	Stefka Kostadinova (BUL)	2.09 m	Rome, Italy	30 August 1987
Olympic record	Yelena Slesarenko (RUS)	2.06 m	Athens, Greece	28 August 2004
World leading	Anna Chicherova (RUS)	2.06 m	Arnstadt, Germany	4 February 2012

== Results ==
=== Qualification ===
Qual. rule: qualification standard 1.96m (Q) or at least best 12 qualified (q).

Rank	Group	Name	Nationality	1.75	1.80	1.85	1.90	1.93	1.96	Result	Note
1	B	Svetlana Radzivil	Uzbekistan	o	o	o	o	xxo	o	1.96	Q, SB
2	A	Ruth Beitia	Spain	-	-	o	o	o	-	1.93	q
2	A	Anna Chicherova	Russia	-	-	o	o	o	-	1.93	q
2	A	Emma Green Tregaro	Sweden	-	-	o	o	o	-	1.93	q, SB
2	B	Tia Hellebaut	Belgium	-	-	o	o	o	-	1.93	q
2	B	Chaunté Lowe	United States	-	o	o	o	o	-	1.93	q
2	A	Melanie Melfort	France	o	o	o	o	o	-	1.93	q, =SB
2	B	Svetlana Shkolina	Russia	-	-	o	o	o	-	1.93	q
9	A	Burcu Ayhan	Turkey	o	o	-	xo	o	-	1.93	q, SB
10	A	Brigetta Barrett	United States	o	o	o	o	xo	-	1.93	q
10	B	Irina Gordeeva	Russia	-	o	o	o	xo	xx-	1.93	q
10	A	Airinė Palšytė	Lithuania	o	o	o	o	xo	-	1.93	q
13	B	Antonia Stergiou	Greece	o	xo	o	xxo	xo	xxx	1.93	SB
14	A	Ariane Friedrich	Germany	-	-	o	o	xxo	xxx	1.93	SB
15	A	Olena Kholosha	Ukraine	-	o	o	o	xxx		1.90	
15	B	Anna Iljuštšenko	Estonia	-	o	o	o	xxx		1.90	
17	B	Doreen Amata	Nigeria	-	o	x-	o	xxx		1.90	SB
18	A	Zheng Xingjuan	China	-	o	o	xxo	xxx		1.90	
19	B	Levern Spencer	Saint Lucia	-	o	xo	xxo	xxx		1.90	
20	B	Amy Acuff	United States	o	o	o	xxx			1.85	
20	A	Nadiya Dusanova	Uzbekistan	-	o	o	xxx			1.85	
20	B	Ebba Jungmark	Sweden	-	o	o	xxx			1.85	
20	B	Lissa Labiche	Seychelles	o	o	o	xxx			1.85	
20	B	Lesyani Mayor	Cuba	o	o	o	xxx			1.85	
20	A	Esthera Petre	Romania	o	o	o	xxx			1.85	
20	B	Venelina Veneva-Mateeva	Bulgaria	-	o	o	xxx			1.85	
27	A	Deirdre Ryan	Ireland	-	o	xo	xxx			1.85	
28	A	Tonje Angelsen	Norway	-	o	xxo	xxx			1.85	
29	A	Wanida Boonwan	Thailand	o	o	xxx				1.80	
29	A	Dương Thị Việt Anh	Vietnam	-	o	xxx				1.80	
29	B	Sahana Kumari	India	-	o	xxx				1.80	
29	A	Oldřiška Marešová	Czech Republic	o	o	xxx				1.80	
29	B	Ana Šimić	Croatia	-	o	xxx				1.80	
34	B	Vita Styopina	Ukraine	xo	xo	xxx				1.80	
—	B	Marina Aitova	Kazakhstan	xxx						—	NM

r = retired from competition

=== Final ===
Rank	Name	Nationality	1.89	1.93	1.97	2.00	2.03	2.05	Result	Note
1st place, gold medalist(s)	Anna Chicherova	Russia	o	o	o	o	o	xo	2.05	WL
2nd place, silver medalist(s)	Brigetta Barrett	United States	o	o	xo	xo	xo	xxx	2.03	PB
3rd place, bronze medalist(s)	Ruth Beitia	Spain	o	o	xo	o	xxx		2.00	=SB
4	Tia Hellebaut	Belgium	o	xxo	o	xxx			1.97	=SB
5	Chaunté Lowe	United States	o	o	xo	xxx			1.97	
6	Svetlana Radzivil	Uzbekistan	o	xxo	xxo	xxx			1.97	SB
7	Emma Green Tregaro	Sweden	xo	o	xxx				1.93	=SB
8	Melanie Melfort	France	o	xo	xxx				1.93	=SB
9	Irina Gordeeva	Russia	o	xxo	xxx				1.93	
10	Airinė Palšytė	Lithuania	o	xxx					1.89	
11	Burcu Ayhan	Turkey	xxo	xxx					1.89	
DSQ	Svetlana Shkolina	Russia	~~o~~	~~o~~	~~o~~	~~o~~	~~xxo~~	~~xxx~~	~~2.03~~	~~PB~~
