= 2007 European Athletics Indoor Championships – Women's high jump =

The Women's high jump event at the 2007 European Athletics Indoor Championships was held on March 2–3.

== Medalists ==
Gold	Silver	Bronze
Tia Hellebaut; Belgium	Antonietta Di Martino; Italy	Ruth Beitia; Spain

Note: Venelina Veneva (Bulgaria) originally took the bronze with 1.96 m but was later disqualified after testing positive for testosterone.

== Results ==
=== Qualification ===
Qualification: Qualification Performance 1.96 (Q) or at least 8 best performers advanced to the final.

Rank	Group	Athlete	Nationality	1.79	1.84	1.89	1.93	1.96	Result	Notes
1.	A	Blanka Vlašić	Croatia	–	o	o	o	xxx	1.93	q
1.	A	Ruth Beitia	Spain	o	o	o	o	xxx	1.93	q
1.	B	Tia Hellebaut	Belgium	–	o	o	o		1.93	q
4.	A	Anna Chicherova	Russia	o	o	xo	o	xxx	1.93	q
5.	B	Antonietta Di Martino	Italy	o	o	o	xo		1.93	q
6.	A	Marta Mendía	Spain	o	o	o	xxo	xxx	1.93	q, SB
7.	A	Melanie Skotnik	France	–	o	xo	xxo	xxx	1.93	q
8.	B	Julia Hartmann	Germany	o	xo	xxo	xxo	xxx	1.93	PB
9.	A	Emma Green	Sweden	o	o	xo	xxx		1.87	
9.	B	Romana Dubnová	Czech Republic	o	o	xo	xxx		1.87	
11.	A	Ariane Friedrich	Germany	o	o	xxo	xxx		1.87	
11.	B	Iryna Kovalenko	Ukraine	o	o	xxo	xxx		1.87	
11.	B	Oana Pantelimon	Romania	–	o	xxo	xxx		1.87	
14.	B	Gema Martín-Pozuelo	Spain	o	o	xxx			1.84	
15.	B	Persefoni Hatzinakou	Greece	xxo	o	xxx			1.84	
16.	A	Karina Vnukova	Lithuania	o	xo	xxx			1.84	
17.	A	Deirdre Ryan	Ireland	xo	xo	xxx			1.84	
18.	B	Viktoria Leks	Estonia	xxo	xo	xxx			1.84	
19.	B	Natālija Čakova	Latvia	o	xxx				1.79	
20.	A	Anne Gerd Eieland	Norway	xo	xxx				1.79	
	B	Venelina Veneva	Bulgaria						DQ	q

=== Final ===
Rank	Athlete	Nationality	1.82	1.87	1.92	1.96	1.99	2.01	2.03	2.05	2.09	Result	Notes
1st place, gold medalist(s)	Tia Hellebaut	Belgium	–	o	o	o	xo	o	o	o	x–	2.05	NR
2nd place, silver medalist(s)	Antonietta Di Martino	Italy	o	o	o	o	xxx					1.96	
3rd place, bronze medalist(s)	Ruth Beitia	Spain	o	o	o	xxo	xxx					1.96	
4	Blanka Vlašić	Croatia	o	xo	o	xxx						1.92	
5	Melanie Skotnik	France	o	o	xo	xxx						1.92	
5	Anna Chicherova	Russia	o	o	xo	xxx						1.92	
7	Marta Mendía	Spain	o	xo	xxx							1.87	
	Venelina Veneva	Bulgaria										DQ	
