= 2012 IAAF World Indoor Championships – Women's high jump =

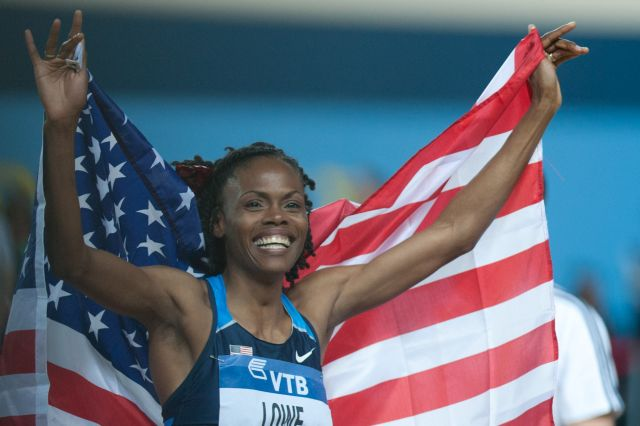
Chaunté Lowe celebrating her win.

The women's high jump at the 2012 IAAF World Indoor Championships took place March 9 and 10 at the Ataköy Athletics Arena.

== Medalists ==
Gold	Silver	Bronze
Chaunté Lowe; United States	Antonietta Di Martino; Italy; Anna Chicherova; Russia; Ebba Jungmark; Sweden	Not awarded

== Records ==
Standing records prior to the 2012 IAAF World Indoor Championships
World record	Kajsa Bergqvist (SWE)	2.08	Arnstadt, Germany	4 February 2006
Championship record	Stefka Kostadinova (BUL)	2.05	Indianapolis, United States	8 March 1987
World Leading	Anna Chicherova (RUS)	2.06	Arnstadt, Germany	4 February 2012
African record	Hestrie Cloete (RSA)	1.97	Birmingham, Great Britain	18 February 2001
Asian record	Svetlana Zalevskaya (KAZ)	1.98	Samara, Russia	2 March 1996
European record	Kajsa Bergqvist (SWE)	2.08	Arnstadt, Germany	4 February 2006
North and Central American and Caribbean record	Chaunté Lowe (USA)	2.02	Albuquerque, United States	26 February 2012
Oceanian Record	Alison Inverarity (AUS)	1.97	Toronto, Canada	13 March 1993
South American record	Solange Witteveen (ARG)	1.94	Brno, Czech Republic	9 February 2000

== Qualification standards ==
Indoor
1.95

== Schedule ==
Date	Time	Round
March 9, 2012	9:30	Qualification
March 10, 2012	18:15	Final

== Results ==
=== Qualification ===
Qualification standard: 1.95 m (Q) or at least best 8 qualified (q). 20 athletes from 17 countries participated. One athlete did not start the competition The qualification round started at 09:37 and ended at 11:46.

Rank	Athlete	Nationality	1.78	1.83	1.88	1.92	1.95	Result	Notes
1	Anna Chicherova	Russia	-	o	o	o	o	1.95	Q
1	Ebba Jungmark	Sweden	-	o	o	o	o	1.95	Q, =SB
3	Antonietta Di Martino	Italy	-	o	o	o	xo	1.95	Q, SB
3	Chaunté Lowe	United States	o	o	o	o	xo	1.95	Q
5	Svetlana Radzivil	Uzbekistan	o	o	o	xxo	xo	1.95	Q, SB
6	Tia Hellebaut	Belgium	o	xo	o	xxo	xo	1.95	Q
7	Ruth Beitia	Spain	-	o	o	o	xxx	1.92	q
7	Esthera Petre	Romania	o	o	o	o	xxx	1.92	q
9	Airinė Palšytė	Lithuania	o	o	o	xo	xxx	1.92	SB
9	Irina Gordeeva	Russia	-	o	o	xo	xxx	1.92	
9	Emma Green Tregaro	Sweden	-	o	o	xo	xxx	1.92	
12	Anna Iljuštšenko	Estonia	o	o	o	xxx		1.88	
13	Zheng Xingjuan	China	o	o	xo	xxx		1.88	
14	Ana Šimić	Croatia	o	xxo	xo	xxx		1.88	
15	Levern Spencer	Saint Lucia	o	o	xxo	xxx		1.88	SB
15	Tonje Angelsen	Norway	o	o	xxo	xxx		1.88	
17	Oksana Okuneva	Ukraine	o	xo	xxx			1.83	
18	Marina Aitova	Kazakhstan	o	xxo	xxx			1.83	
	Venelina Veneva-Mateeva	Bulgaria	-	xxx				NM	
	Inika McPherson	United States	xxx					NM	
	Burcu Ayhan	Turkey						DNS	

=== Final ===
8 athletes from 8 countries participated. The final started at 18:16 and ended at 19:24.

Rank	Athlete	Nationality	1.84	1.88	1.92	1.95	1.98	2.01	Result	Notes
1st place, gold medalist(s)	Chaunté Lowe	United States	o	o	xo	xo	o	xxx	1.98	
2nd place, silver medalist(s)	Antonietta Di Martino	Italy	o	o	o	o	xxx		1.95	=SB
2nd place, silver medalist(s)	Anna Chicherova	Russia	o	o	o	o	xxx		1.95	
2nd place, silver medalist(s)	Ebba Jungmark	Sweden	o	o	o	o	xxx		1.95	=SB
5	Tia Hellebaut	Belgium	o	xo	o	o	xxx		1.95	
6	Ruth Beitia	Spain	o	o	o	xo	xxx		1.95	SB
7	Esthera Petre	Romania	o	xxo	o	xxx			1.92	
8	Svetlana Radzivil	Uzbekistan	o	o	xo	xxx			1.92	
