= 2011 European Athletics Indoor Championships – Women's high jump =

The Women's high jump event at the 2011 European Athletics Indoor Championships was held on March 5–6, 2011 with the final on March 6 at 15:30.

== Records ==
Standing records prior to the 2011 European Athletics Indoor Championships
World record	Kajsa Bergqvist (SWE)	2.08	Arnstadt, Germany	4 February 2006
European record	Kajsa Bergqvist (SWE)	2.08	Arnstadt, Germany	4 February 2006
Championship record	Tia Hellebaut (BEL)	2,05	Birmingham, United Kingdom	3 March 2005
World Leading	Antonietta Di Martino (ITA)	2.04	Banská Bystrica, Slovakia	9 February 2011
European Leading	Antonietta Di Martino (ITA)	2.04	Banská Bystrica, Slovakia	9 February 2011

== Results ==
=== Qualification ===
Qualification: Qualification Performance 1.94 (Q) or at least 8 best performers advanced to the final.

Rank	Athlete	Nationality	1.75	1.80	1.85	1.89	1.92	1.94	Result	Notes
1	Antonietta Di Martino	Italy	–	o	o	o	o	o	1.94	Q
1	Svetlana Shkolina	Russia	–	o	o	o	o	o	1.94	Q
3	Venelina Veneva-Mateeva	Bulgaria	–	o	o	xo	xo	o	1.94	Q
4	Melanie Melfort	France	o	o	xo	o	o	xo	1.94	Q, SB
5	Ebba Jungmark	Sweden	–	o	o	o	xxo	xo	1.94	Q, PB
6	Danielle Frenkel	Israel	–	o	o	o	o	xxo	1.94	Q, NR
7	Oksana Okuneva	Ukraine	–	o	o	xo	xo	xxo	1.94	Q, PB
8	Ruth Beitía	Spain	–	o	o	o	o	xxx	1.92	q
9	Mariya Kuchina	Russia	xo	o	o	o	o	xxx	1.92	
10	Tonje Angelsen	Norway	o	o	o	o	xxo	xxx	1.92	PB
11	Grete Udras	Estonia	o	o	xxo	xo	xxo	xxx	1.92	=PB
12	Stine Kufaas	Norway	–	o	o	xo	xxx		1.89	=SB
13	Anna Iljuštšenko	Estonia	–	o	xo	xo	xxx		1.89	=SB
14	Viktoriya Klyugina	Russia	–	o	o	xxo	xxx		1.89	
15	Marie-Laurence Jungfleisch	Germany	o	o	xo	xxo	xxx		1.89	
16	Øyunn Grindem Mogstad	Norway	–	o	o	xxx			1.85	
16	Raffaella Lamera	Italy	o	o	o	xxx			1.85	
16	Esthera Petre	Romania	o	o	o	xxx			1.85	
19	Airinė Palšytė	Lithuania	o	xo	o	xxx			1.85	
20	Ana Šimić	Croatia	o	xxo	o	xxx			1.85	
21	Raquel Álvarez	Spain	o	xo	xo	xxx			1.85	
21	Beatrice Lundmark	Switzerland	o	xo	xo	xxx			1.85	
23	Maayan Furman	Israel	o	o	xxx				1.80	

=== Final ===
The final was held at 15:30.

Rank	Athlete	Nationality	1.82	1.87	1.92	1.96	1.99	2.01	2.03	Result	Notes
1st place, gold medalist(s)	Antonietta Di Martino	Italy	o	o	o	o	o	xo	xxx	2.01	
2nd place, silver medalist(s)	Ruth Beitía	Spain	o	xo	o	o	xxx			1.96	SB
3rd place, bronze medalist(s)	Ebba Jungmark	Sweden	o	o	o	xxo	xxx			1.96	PB
4	Danielle Frenkel	Israel	o	o	o	xxx				1.92	
4	Melanie Melfort	France	o	o	o	xxx				1.92	
4	Svetlana Shkolina	Russia	–	o	o	xxx				1.92	
7	Oksana Okuneva	Ukraine	o	o	xo	xxx				1.92	
7	Venelina Veneva-Mateeva	Bulgaria	o	o	xo	xxx				1.92	
