= Ruth Beitia =

Spanish high jumper (born 1979)

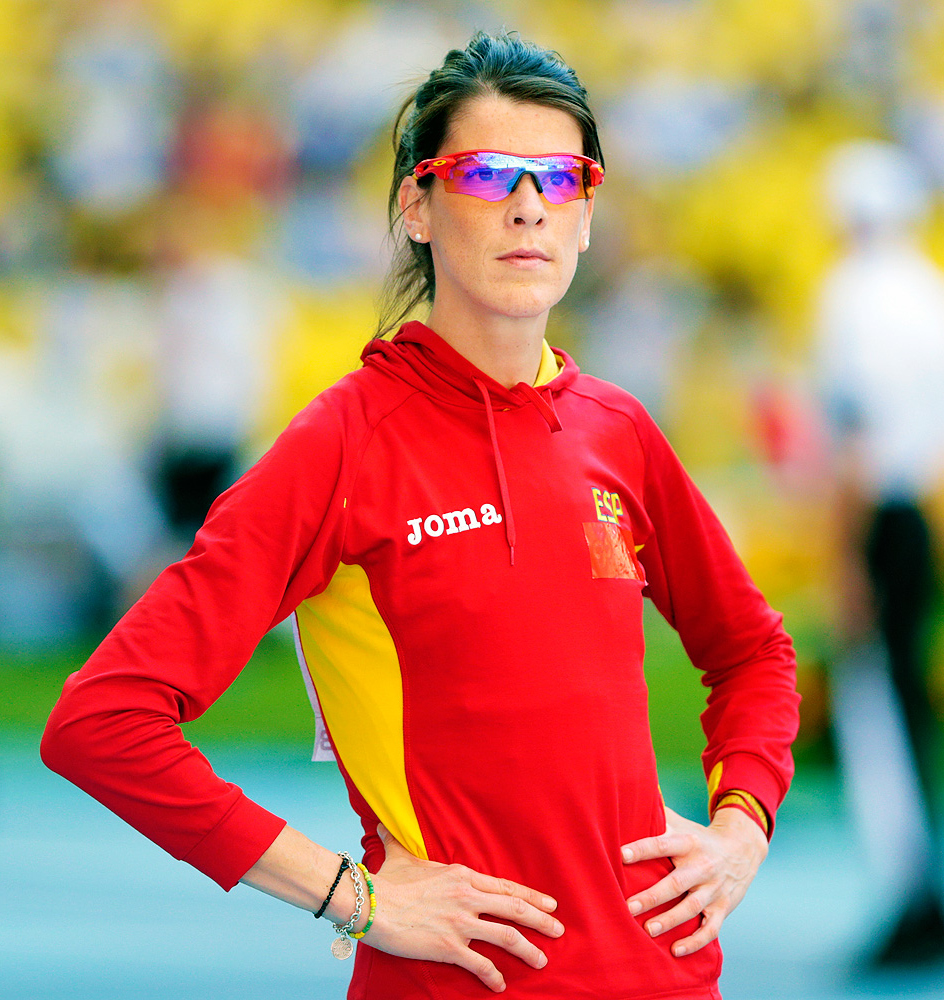

Personal information
- Full name: Ruth Beitia Vila
- Born: 1 April 1979 (age 47) Santander, Spain
- Height: 1.91 m (6 ft 3 in)
- Weight: 72 kg (159 lb)

Sport
- Country: Spain
- Sport: Athletics
- Event: High jump
- Club: Atletismo Piélagos

Achievements and titles
- Personal best: High jump: 2.02 m (2007)
Medal record
Women's athletics
Representing Spain
| Event | 1st | 2nd | 3rd |
|---|---|---|---|
| Olympic Games | 1 | 0 | 1 |
| World Championships | 0 | 1 | 0 |
| World Indoor Championships | 0 | 2 | 2 |
| European Championships | 3 | 0 | 0 |
| European Indoor Championships | 1 | 4 | 1 |
| Mediterranean Games | 1 | 0 | 0 |
| Total | 6 | 7 | 4 |
Olympic Games
| Gold medal – first place | 2016 Rio de Janeiro | High jump |
| Bronze medal – third place | 2012 London | High jump |
World Championships
| Silver medal – second place | 2013 Moscow | High jump |
World Indoor Championships
| Silver medal – second place | 2010 Doha | High jump |
| Silver medal – second place | 2016 Portland | High jump |
| Bronze medal – third place | 2006 Moscow | High jump |
| Bronze medal – third place | 2014 Sopot | High jump |
European Championships
| Gold medal – first place | 2012 Helsinki | High jump |
| Gold medal – first place | 2014 Zürich | High jump |
| Gold medal – first place | 2016 Amsterdam | High jump |
European Indoor Championships
| Gold medal – first place | 2013 Gothenburg | High jump |
| Silver medal – second place | 2005 Madrid | High jump |
| Silver medal – second place | 2009 Turin | High jump |
| Silver medal – second place | 2011 Paris | High jump |
| Silver medal – second place | 2017 Belgrade | High jump |
| Bronze medal – third place | 2007 Birmingham | High jump |
European U23 Championships
| Gold medal – first place | 2001 Amsterdam | High jump |
Mediterranean Games
| Gold medal – first place | 2005 Almería | High jump |

Ruth Beitia

Leader of the Opposition in the Parliament of Cantabria
- Incumbent
- Assumed office 7 January 2019
- Preceded by: María José Sáenz de Buruaga

Member of the Parliament of Cantabria
- Incumbent
- Assumed office 2011

Personal details
- Born: Ruth Beitia Vila; 1 April 1979 (age 47) Santander, Cantabria, Spain
- Party: People's Party of Cantabria
- Occupation: Athlete, physical education teacher

Ruth Beitia Vila (Spanish pronunciation: [rut ˈβejtja]; born 1 April 1979) is a Spanish retired high jumper who was the 2016 Olympic champion in the women's high jump. She was also a politician in the Partido Popular and a member of the Parliament of Cantabria.

== Biography ==
Beitia first broke the Spanish record in 1998, jumping 1.89 m. She raised the record progressively up to 2.02 m, the current Spanish record, which she achieved on 4 August 2007. She is the first, and thus far, only Spanish woman to have jumped higher than two metres.

Beitia's first senior international appearance was at the 2002 European Athletics Championships in Munich, where she finished 11th. At the 2003 World Championships in Paris, she also finished 11th. At the 2004 Athens Olympics she failed to reach the finals. In 2005, she won the silver medal at the 2005 European Indoor Championships in Madrid but at the world championships at Helsinki 2005 she failed to reach the finals. In 2006, she won the bronze medal at the World Indoor Athletics Championships in Moscow.

In 2009, she won the silver medal at the 2009 European Athletics Indoor Championships in Turin. At the 2009 World Championships in Athletics in Berlin, she placed fifth (fourth after competitor disqualification). In 2012, she won the gold medal at the European Championships in Helsinki and at the 2012 London Olympics she was fourth, after which she retired from competition.

After a few months, disappointed by her failure to win an Olympic medal, Beitia came back from retirement. She won the gold medal at the 2013 European Athletics Indoor Championships in Gothenburg. Then she would become European champion twice more, in 2014 at Zürich and in 2016 at Amsterdam. Finally, she won gold at the 2016 Rio de Janeiro Olympic Games, with a height of 1.97m. This was the lowest winning height at the Olympics since the 1980 Summer Olympic Games, when Italian Sara Simeoni also cleared 1.97m.

Beitia ended in 12th place in the 2017 World Championships in Athletics and received the IAAF Fair Play Award for her behaviour during the competition.

She announced her retirement from competition in October 2017, following a rheumatoid arthritis process.

In 2021, two years after the original bronze medalist Svetlana Shkolina of the 2012 Olympics from Russia had been disqualified for failing in doping test, Beitia was reallocated as the bronze medalist of that event.

== Olympic results ==
| Olympic Games | Discipline | Place |
|---|---|---|
| (Greece) 2004 Athens | High jump | 16 |
| (China) 2008 Beijing | High jump | 4 |
| (United Kingdom) 2012 London | High jump | 3 |
| (Brazil) 2016 Rio de Janeiro | High jump | 1 |

== Achievements ==
| Year | Competition | Venue | Position | Notes |
Representing Spain
| 1995 | European Youth Olympic Days | Bath, United Kingdom | 5th | 1.80 m |
| 1996 | World Junior Championships | Sydney, Australia | 16th (q) | 1.79 m |
| 1997 | Mediterranean Games | Bari, Italy | 9th | 1.70 m |
| 1997 | European Junior Championships | Ljubljana, Slovenia | 9th | 1.82 m |
| 1998 | World Junior Championships | Annecy, France | 8th | 1.80 m |
| 1999 | European U23 Championships | Gothenburg, Sweden | 11th | 1.82 m |
| 2000 | Ibero-American Championships | Rio de Janeiro, Brazil | 4th | 1.81 m |
| 2001 | World Indoor Championships | Lisbon, Portugal | 7th | 1.93 m |
| 2001 | European U23 Championships | Amsterdam, Netherlands | 1st | 1.87 m |
| 2001 | Mediterranean Games | Radès, Tunisia | 4th | 1.83 m |
| 2002 | European Championships | Munich, Germany | 11th | 1.85 m |
| 2003 | World Indoor Championships | Birmingham, United Kingdom | 5th | 1.96 m |
| 2003 | World Championships | Paris, France | 11th | 1.90 m |
| 2004 | World Indoor Championships | Budapest, Hungary | 9th (q) | 1.93 m |
| 2004 | Ibero-American Championships | Huelva, Spain | 4th | 1.88 m |
| 2004 | Olympic Games | Athens, Greece | 16th (q) | 1.89 m |
| 2005 | European Indoor Championships | Madrid, Spain | 2nd | 1.99 m |
| 2005 | World Athletics Final | Monte Carlo, Monaco | 7th | 1.89 m |
| 2005 | Mediterranean Games | Almería, Spain | 1st | 1.95 m |
| 2006 | World Indoor Championships | Moscow, Russia | 3rd | 1.98 m |
| 2006 | European Championships | Gothenburg, Sweden | 9th | 1.92 m |
| 2006 | World Athletics Final | Stuttgart, Germany | 6th | 1.90 m |
| 2007 | European Indoor Championships | Birmingham, United Kingdom | 3rd | 1.96 m |
| 2007 | World Championships | Osaka, Japan | 6th | 1.97 m |
| 2008 | World Indoor Championships | Valencia, Spain | 4th | 1.99 m |
| 2008 | Olympic Games | Beijing, China | 4th | 1.96 m |
| 2009 | European Indoor Championships | Turin, Italy | 2nd | 1.99 m |
| 2009 | World Championships | Berlin, Germany | 4th | 1.99 m |
| 2010 | World Indoor Championships | Doha, Qatar | 2nd | 1.98 m |
| 2010 | Ibero-American Championships | San Fernando, Spain | 1st | 1.89 m |
| 2010 | European Championships | Barcelona, Spain | 6th | 1.95 m |
| 2011 | European Indoor Championships | Paris, France | 2nd | 1.96 m |
| 2011 | World Championships | Daegu, South Korea | 16th (q) | 1.92 m |
| 2012 | World Indoor Championships | Istanbul, Turkey | 6th | 1.95 m |
| 2012 | European Championships | Helsinki, Finland | 1st | 1.97 m |
| 2012 | Olympic Games | London, United Kingdom | 3rd | 2.00 m |
| 2013 | European Indoor Championships | Gothenburg, Sweden | 1st | 1.99 m |
| 2013 | World Championships | Moscow, Russia | 2nd | 1.97 m |
| 2014 | World Indoor Championships | Sopot, Poland | 3rd | 2.00 m |
| 2014 | European Championships | Zürich, Switzerland | 1st | 2.01 m |
| 2015 | European Indoor Championships | Prague, Czech Republic | 5th | 1.94 m |
| 2015 | World Championships | Beijing, China | 5th | 1.99 m |
| 2015 | Diamond League | | 1st | details |
| 2016 | World Indoor Championships | Portland, United States | 2nd | 1.96 m |
| 2016 | European Championships | Amsterdam, Netherlands | 1st | 1.98 m |
| 2016 | Olympic Games | Rio de Janeiro, Brazil | 1st | 1.97 m |
| 2016 | Diamond League | | 1st | details |
| 2017 | European Indoor Championships | Belgrade, Serbia | 2nd | 1.94 m |
| 2017 | World Championships | London, United Kingdom | 12th | 1.88 m |

== Personal Bests ==
| Type | Event | Best | Location | Date |
|---|---|---|---|---|
| Outdoor | High Jump | 2.02 m | San Sebastián, Spain | 4 August 2007 |
| Indoor | High Jump | 2.01 m | Pireás, Greece | 24 February 2007 |

== Political career ==
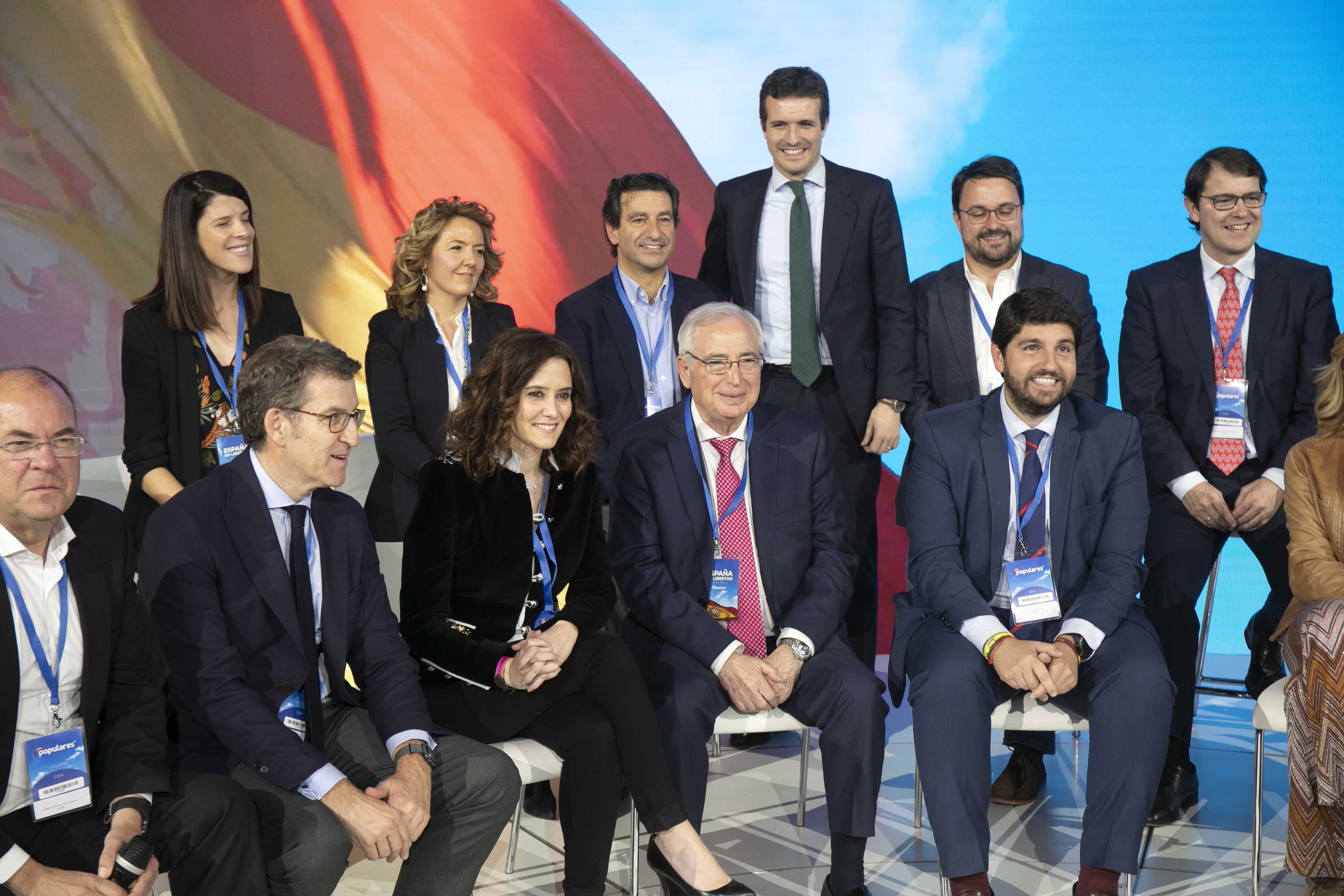
Beitia in company of Pablo Casado and other PP honchos in January 2019.

In 2008, Beitia was named chair of the Regional Executive Committee of the local branch of the People's Party (PP), serving in that capacity until 2012.

In 2011, she was ninth on the closed list of the PP for the election to the Parliament of Cantabria; the PP won 20 seats and she was duly elected. During her first term, she was named First Parliamentary Secretary, presiding over committee meetings and other gatherings of leading parliamentary officials.

In the 2015 election, the PP lost its absolute majority and did not form the next government; however, she advanced her place on the list to sixth and was re-elected.

In September 2018, Beitia was appointed a member of the national PP's executive board by leader Pablo Casado, serving as Secretary of Sport.

In January 2019, the PP announced her advance on the list for the 2019 election to first place, thus becoming the party's candidate for President of Cantabria. Nevertheless, a few days after Beitia stepped down and informed Casado of her decision to "leave politics due to strictly personal and family reasons".

Awards
| Preceded by Carolina Marín | Spanish Sportswoman of the Year; 2015 | Succeeded by Maialen Chourraut; Lydia Valentín |
Sporting positions
| Preceded by Brigetta Barrett | Women's High Jump Best Year Performance; 2014 (tied with Mariya Kuchina and Anna Chicherova) | Succeeded by Anna Chicherova |
