= Klyugin =

Klyugin (Russian: Клюгин) is a Russian male surname, its feminine counterpart is Klyugina. Notable people with the surname include:

- Sergey Klyugin (born 1974), Russian high jumper
- Viktoriya Klyugina (born 1980), Russian high jumper, wife of Sergey
