= Melanie Skotnik =

French-German high jumper

Melanie Melfort
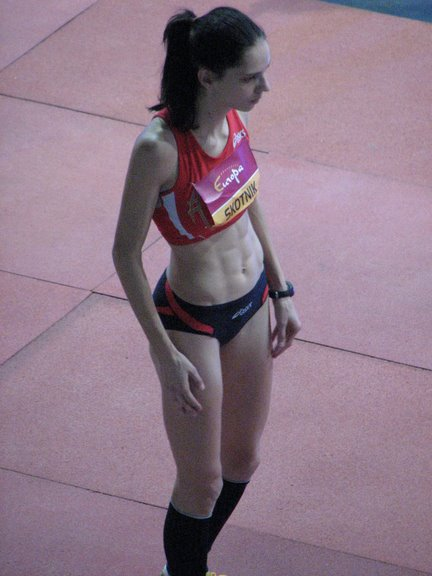
- Melanie Melfort

Personal information
- Nationality: French and German
- Born: Melanie Skotnik; 8 November 1982 (age 43) Hersbruck, West Germany
- Height: 1.82 m (6 ft 0 in)
- Weight: 59 kg (130 lb)

Sport
- Country: France
- Sport: Athletics
- Event: High jump

Achievements and titles
- Olympic finals: best result: 9th at the 2012 Summer Olympics
- World finals: best result: 7th at the 2007 World Championships in Athletics
- National finals: 1st at the 2003 German Athletics Championships; 1st at several French Athletics Championships
- Personal bests: High jump (outdoor): 1.96 m (2007; =NR); High jump (indoor): 1.97 m (2003, 2007)
Medal record
Women's athletics
Representing France
Jeux de la Francophonie
Gold medal – first place	2013 Nice	High jump
Mediterranean Games
Silver medal – second place	2005 Almería	High jump

Melanie Skotnik (formerly Melfort; born 8 November 1982 in Hersbruck, West Germany) is a French-German high jumper. She holds both German and French nationalities through her parentage and represented Germany until 2004. She retired in June 2016.

Skotnik finished in seventh position and ninth position, respectively, in the finals of the 2007 World Championships and 2009 World Championships. She was eliminated in the qualification rounds of the 2005 and 2011 World Championships.

At her first Olympics - the 2008 Summer Olympics, Skotnik fell 4 cm short of reaching the final after clearing 1.89 metres to finish joint 16th place in the qualification round. At the 2012 Summer Olympics, she reached the final and finished in 9th place at 1.93m.

Skotnik's outdoor personal best jump is 1.96m, achieved on 11 August 2007 in Castres, which tied her with the French national outdoor record first set by Maryse Éwanjé-Épée on July 21, 1985. She has won several French Athletics Championships (outdoor and indoor) titles. She competed in the German national championships as a member of LG Domspitzmilch Regensburg, but represented France internationally. Skotnik also holds the French national indoor record of 1.97m, achieved in Aubière on 18 February 2007 and in Dortmund in February 2003

Skotnik married a French sprinter, Jimmy Melfort, in July 2009. She reverted to her maiden name in 2013, announcing that she was in the process of divorcing Melfort, who had been her coach since 2005.

== Results in international competitions ==
- Note: Only the position and height in the final are indicated, unless otherwise stated. (q) means the athlete did not qualify for the final, with the overall position and height in the qualification round indicated.

Year	Competition	Venue	Position	Notes
Representing Germany
1999	World Youth Championships	Bydgoszcz, Poland	4th	1.79 m
1999	European Junior Championships	Riga, Latvia	12th	1.79 m
2000	World Junior Championships	Santiago, Chile	5th	1.85 m
2003	European U23 Championships	Bydgoszcz, Poland	4th	1.87 m
2004	World Indoor Championships	Budapest, Hungary	16th (q)	1.86 m
Representing France
2005	Mediterranean Games	Almería, Spain	2nd	1.95 m
2005	European Cup	Florence, Italy	3rd	1.92 m
2005	World Championships	Helsinki, Finland	15th (q)	1.88 m
2007	European Indoor Championships	Birmingham, United Kingdom	5th	1.92 m
2007	World Championships	Osaka, Japan	7th	1.94 m
2008	Olympic Games	Beijing, China	16th (q)	1.89 m
2009	World Championships	Berlin, Germany	8th	1.92 m
2011	European Indoor Championships	Paris, France	4th	1.92 m
2011	World Championships	Daegu, South Korea	15th (q)	1.92 m
2012	European Championships	Helsinki, Finland	6th	1.92 m
2012	Olympic Games	London, United Kingdom	9th	1.93 m
2013	European Indoor Championships	Gothenburg, Sweden	9th (q)	1.92 m
2013	Jeux de la Francophonie	Nice, France	1st	1.90 m
