= Danielle Frenkel =

Israeli high jumper (born 1987)

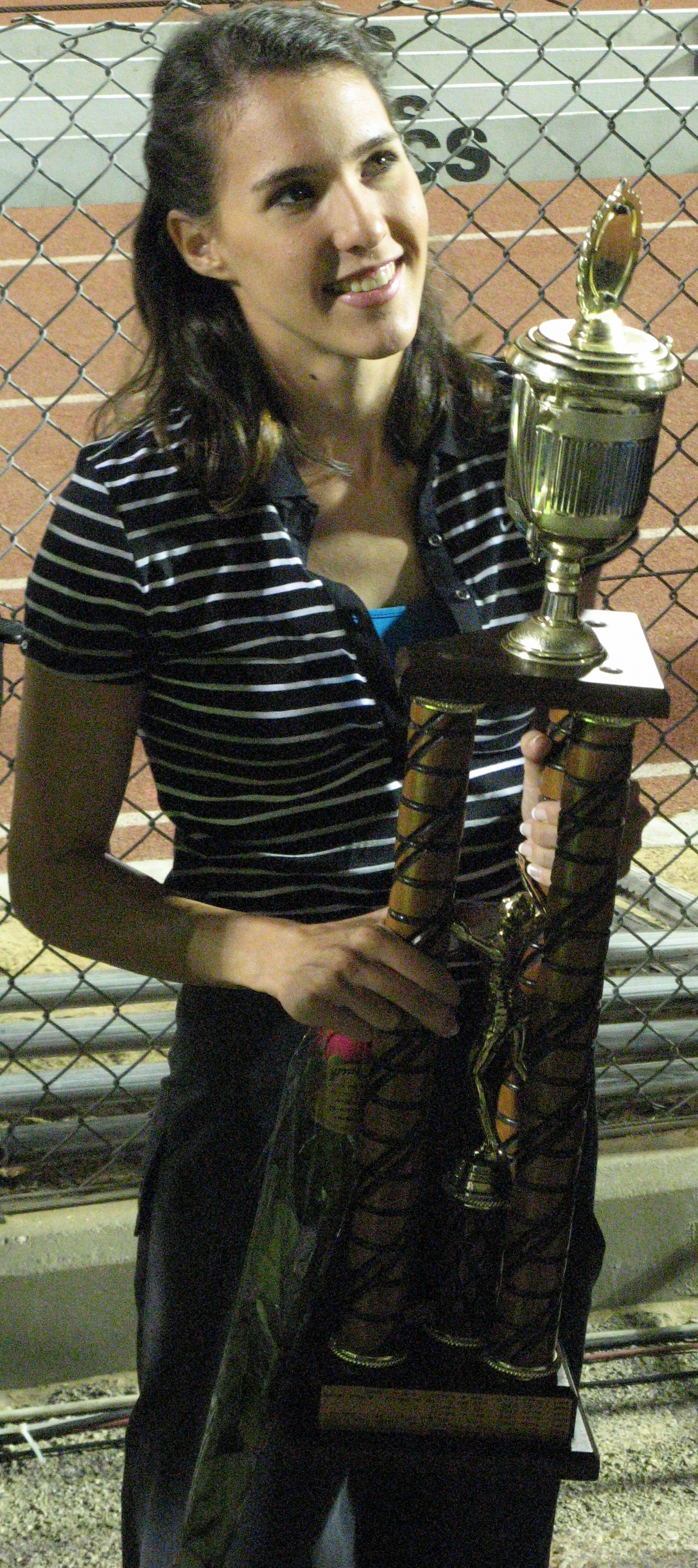
- Frenkel with the "Woman Athlete of the Year" trophy at the Israel track & field championships; 2011

Personal information
- Native name: דניאל פרנקל
- Nickname: The Israeli Gravity Bender
- Nationality: Israeli
- Born: September 8, 1987 (age 38)

Sport
- Sport: Track & field
- Events: High jump; Triple jump
- Coached by: Anatoly Shafran

Achievements and titles
- National finals: Israeli national high jump champion (2010 & 2011)

Danielle Frenkel (Hebrew: דניאל פרנקל; born September 8, 1987) is an Israeli high jumper. She was the first female Israeli to clear 1.90 meters, and the only woman who cleared more than 1.90 meters in international competition.

== Biography ==
Danielle Frenkel was interested in being a professional dancer, and trained for years as a teenager with the Bat-Dor Dance Company. Two months after she began her army service, as a guide at Yad Vashem (a memorial to Jewish victims of the Holocaust), Israeli high jump coach Anatoly Shafran, who had seen her jump in a high school competition when she was 14, began an effort to convince her to jump competitively. She is a law student at the Interdisciplinary Center. Her nickname is the “Gravity Bender”.

== High jumping career ==
In 2007, when Frenkel began her training with Shafran, she jumped 1.69 meters. In each of the next two years, she improved her personal best by 6 centimeters, jumping 1.81 meters in 2009.

Her breakthrough year was 2010, in which she improved her personal best by 11 centimeters. After several improvements of her personal best, she won the national championships title for the first time, and also became the Israeli record holder with a jump of 1.89m, and few minutes later improved the fresh record to 1.91m. By this achievement, she qualified for the European Championships, held in Barcelona in late July. In the qualifying, she cleared every height in the first attempt, until she set another national record with a jump of 1.92m, and qualified for the Final, becoming the first ever Israeli female athlete to do so. Two days later in the final, her mediocre jump of 1.85m left her in 12th and last place.

In January 2011, Frenkel twice set a new Israeli national indoor record, at 1.87 meters and 1.90 meters. In March, at the European Indoor Championships in Paris, she set an Israeli record of 1.94 meters in qualifying. In the final, she reached fourth place with a jump of 1.92m, another best ever achievement for an Israeli woman. In July 2011, she became Israeli national champion for the second consecutive year, with a jump of 1.89 m. In August, she had a disappointment at the World Championships in Daegu, as she jumped only 1.85m and failed to qualify. Her season best outdoors was 1.90m, set in June at Neurim.

In June 2011, Frenkel finished fourth in the triple jump at 12.24 meters at the European Team Championships group three in Iceland.

== Championships summary ==
Year	Competition	Venue	Position	Event	Notes
Representing Israel
2009	European U23 Championships	Kaunas, Lithuania	17th (q)	High jump	1.72 m
2010	European Championships	Barcelona, Spain	12th	High jump	1.85 m
2011	European Indoor Championships	Paris, France	4th	High jump	1.92 m
2011	Universiade	Shenzhen, China	17th (q)	High jump	1.75 m
2011	World Championships	Daegu, South Korea	24th (q)	High jump	1.85 m
2021	Balkan Championships	Smederevo, Serbia	7th	High jump	1.86 m

== See also ==
- Sports in Israel
- List of Israeli records in athletics
- List of select Jewish track and field athletes
