= Ebba Jungmark =

Swedish high jumper

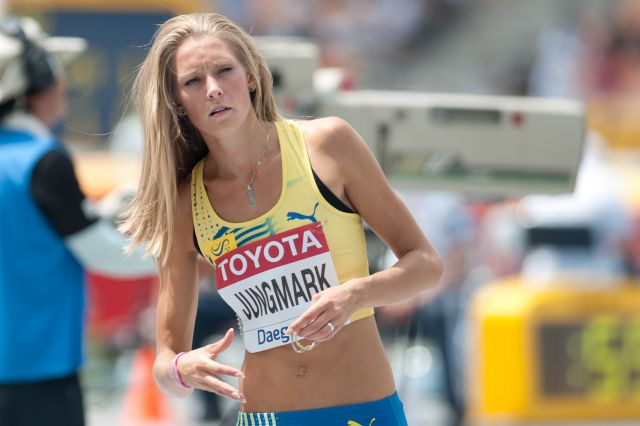
- Jungmark at the 2011 World championships Athletics in Daegu.

Medal record

Women's athletics

Representing Sweden

World Indoor Championships
Silver medal – second place	2012 Istanbul	High jump

European Indoor Championships
Silver medal – second place	2013 Gothenburg	High jump
Bronze medal – third place	2011 Paris	High jump

Ebba Anna Jungmark (born 10 March 1987) is a Swedish high jumper.

She finished fifth at the 2006 World Junior Championships, won the bronze medal at the 2007 European U23 Championships, and competed at the 2007 World Championships without reaching the final. Jungmark won the NCAA Indoor Championship for Washington State University in March 2008 (1.89 m).

Her personal best jump is 1.96 metres, achieved at the 2011 European Athletics Indoor Championships in Paris, France.

Jungmark won the silver medal at the 2012 IAAF World Indoor Championships in Istanbul.

== Competition record ==
Year	Competition	Venue	Position	Notes
Representing Sweden
2005	European Junior Championships	Kaunas, Lithuania	12th	1.73 m
2006	World Junior Championships	Beijing, China	5th	1.84 m
2007	European U23 Championships	Debrecen, Hungary	3rd	1.89 m
2007	World Championships	Osaka, Japan	23rd (q)	1.88 m
2009	European U23 Championships	Kaunas, Lithuania	5th	1.86 m
2010	European Championships	Barcelona, Spain	17th (q)	1.90 m
2011	European Indoor Championships	Paris, France	3rd	1.96 m
2011	World Championships	Daegu, South Korea	17th (q)	1.92 m
2012	World Indoor Championships	Istanbul, Turkey	2nd	1.95 m
2012	European Championships	Helsinki, Finland	10th	1.85 m
2012	Olympic Games	London, United Kingdom	20th (q)	1.85 m
2013	European Indoor Championships	Gothenburg, Sweden	2nd	1.96 m
