= 2011 European Athletics U23 Championships – Women's high jump =

The women's high jump at the 2011 European Athletics U23 Championships was held at the Městský stadion on 14 and 16 July.

== Medalists ==
Gold	Esthera Petre; Romania (ROU)
Silver	Oksana Okuneva; Ukraine (UKR)
Bronze	Burcu Ayhan; Turkey (TUR)

== Schedule ==
Date	Time	Round
14 July 2011	10:15	Qualification
16 July 2011	16:25	Final

== Results ==
=== Qualification ===
Qualification: Qualification Performance 1.86 (Q) or at least 12 best performers advanced to the final.

Rank	Group	Athlete	Nationality	1.69	1.73	1.77	1.80	1.82	1.84	Result	Notes
1	B	Burcu Ayhan	Turkey	-	-	o	o	o	o	1.84	q
1	B	Magdalena Ogrodnik	Poland	-	o	o	o	o	o	1.84	q
1	A	Oksana Okuneva	Ukraine	-	-	-	o	o	o	1.84	q
1	A	Esthera Petre	Romania	-	-	o	o	o	o	1.84	q
1	A	Anna Shorstova	Russia	-	o	o	o	o	o	1.84	q
6	B	Tonje Angelsen	Norway	-	-	o	-	xo	o	1.84	q
6	B	Hanne van Hessche	Belgium	-	o	o	o	xo	o	1.84	q, SB
8	B	Yuliya Kostrova	Russia	o	o	xo	o	xo	o	1.84	q
9	A	Ana Simic	Croatia	-	-	xo	o	o	xo	1.84	q
10	B	Maiju Mattila	Finland	-	o	o	o	xxo	xo	1.84	q, SB
11	B	Marie-Laurence Jungfleisch	Germany	-	o	o	xo	o	xxo	1.84	q
12	A	Elina Smolander	Finland	o	o	xo	xxo	o	xxx	1.82	q, PB
13	B	Victoria Dronsfield	Sweden	o	o	o	xxo	xo	xxx	1.82	=PB
14	A	Chiara Vitobello	Italy	o	o	o	o	xxo	xxx	1.82	
15	A	Maryia Nestsiarchuk	Belarus	-	o	o	xo	xxx		1.80	
16	A	Ellen Björklund	Sweden	o	o	xo	xo	xxx		1.80	=SB
17	B	Mirela Demireva	Bulgaria	o	o	xxo	xo	xxx		1.80	
18	A	Lisa Egarter	Austria	o	xo	o	xxo	xxx		1.80	
19	A	Katarina Mögenburg	Norway	o	o	o	xxx			1.77	
19	B	Sietske Noorman	Netherlands	o	o	o	xxx			1.77	

=== Final ===
Rank	Athlete	Nationality	1.71	1.76	1.80	1.84	1.87	1.90	1.92	1.94	1.96	1.98	2.00	Result	Notes
1st place, gold medalist(s)	Esthera Petre	Romania	-	-	o	o	o	o	xo	o	xxo	xxo	xxx	1.98	=CR
2nd place, silver medalist(s)	Oksana Okuneva	Ukraine	-	-	o	o	o	o	o	o	xxx	-	-	1.94	PB
3rd place, bronze medalist(s)	Burcu Ayhan	Turkey	-	-	o	o	o	o	xxo	o	xxx	-	-	1.94	NR
4	Tonje Angelsen	Norway	-	-	o	o	o	o	o	xxx	-	-	-	1.92	PB
5	Magdalena Ogrodnik	Poland	-	o	o	o	xo	o	xo	xxx	-	-	-	1.92	PB
6	Yuliya Kostrova	Russia	o	xo	o	o	xxo	o	xxo	xxx	-	-	-	1.92	=PB
7	Ana Simic	Croatia	-	-	o	o	o	xxo	xxx	-	-	-	-	1.90	
8	Marie-Laurence Jungfleisch	Germany	-	o	o	xo	o	xxx	-	-	-	-	-	1.87	
9	Hanne van Hessche	Belgium	-	o	o	o	xxo	xxx	-	-	-	-	-	1.87	=PB
10	Anna Shorstova	Russia	-	o	o	o	xxx	-	-	-	-	-	-	1.84	
11	Elina Smolander	Finland	o	o	xxo	xxo	xxx	-	-	-	-	-	-	1.84	PB
12	Maiju Mattila	Finland	o	xo	xxx	-	-	-	-	-	-	-	-	1.76	

== Participation ==
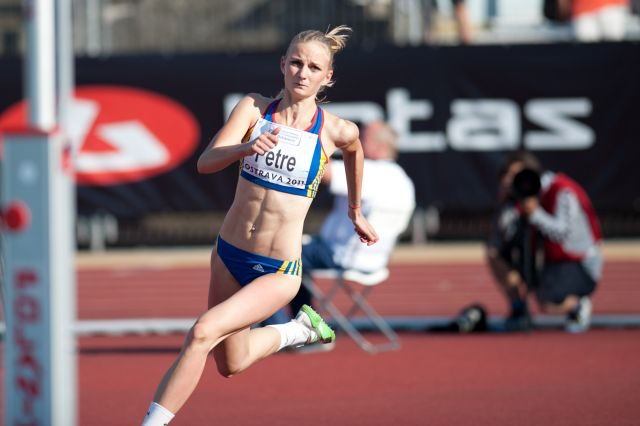
Gold medalist, Esthera Petre

According to an unofficial count, 20 athletes from 16 countries participated in the event.

- Austria (1)
- Belarus (1)
- Belgium (1)
- Bulgaria (1)
- Croatia (1)
- Finland (2)
- Germany (1)
- Italy (1)
- Netherlands (1)
- Norway (2)
- Poland (1)
- Romania (1)
- Russia (2)
- Sweden (2)
- Turkey (1)
- Ukraine (1)
