= Stine Kufaas =

Norwegian high jumper

Personal information
- Born: April 7, 1986 (age 40) Trondheim, Norway

Sport
- Country: Norway
- Club: IL i BUL
- Now coaching: by Hanne Haugland

Achievements and titles
- Personal best(s): High jump (outdoor): 1.93 m High jump (indoor): 1.92 m

Stine Kufaas (born 7 April 1986) is a Norwegian high jumper. Her personal best jump is 1.93 metres (6 ft 4.0 in), achieved in June 2010 at a national competition at Lillehammer. She has 1.92 metres (6 ft 3.6 in) on the indoor track, achieved in February 2010 in Eskilstuna. She is also the Norwegian record holder in the standing high jump, at 1.53 metres (5 ft 0.2 in).

== Early life and career ==
She grew up in Buvika, a settlement which had 1,856 inhabitants in 2009. She represented the club Trondheim Friidrett.

In 2003, she recorded 1.78 metres as a personal best. This was recorded in the qualification round at the 2003 European Youth Olympic Festival. In the final round she jumped 1.76 metres to record a fifth place. She also won her first national championship medal, a bronze. She struggled more in the 2004 season, recording 1.73 as a season's best. Near the end of the year it became clear that she had struggled with infectious mononucleosis.

In 2005 a "lift project" was set up by the national association. It was spearheaded by former World Championships competitor Anne Gerd Eieland, and in total, seven women were a part of the project. Coaches were Dan Simion and Adrian Proteasa while the architect of the project was Terje Totland. Simion soon left, but Hanne Haugland was added as a coach. Also, the project was shrunk to four jumpers, because injury struck some of the project members. The goal was to have two jumpers qualified for the 2008 Olympic Games. Around this time, Kufaas still lived in Buvika, and trained in the nearby Trondheim Municipality as well as in the local Bøndernes Hus. Traditionally a social house for the farmers' community, Bøndernes Hus was reinvented by Kufaas and her coach as a makeshift high jump arena, with modest economic support from Skaun Municipality and local businesses. The "lift project" was disestablished after the 2006 season, however.

== Later career ==
Her result progression was positive. She achieved a new personal best in August 2005, when jumping 1.81 at the Norwegian Championships at Fana stadion to win the silver behind Anne Gerd Eieland. In early 2006 she improved further at the Norwegian Indoor Championships. She did not win, but beat Anne Gerd Eieland and achieved the same result as the winner Øyunn Grindem, with 1.83 metres. She beat Eieland again at the 2006 Norwegian Championships at Bislett stadion, when she won her first national title with 1.83 metres. Her personal best had been improved to 1.85 metres in May. She added another centimetre to this in June 2007 in Stjørdalshalsen. In the summer she took a national silver medal, behind Eieland, and competed at the European U23 Championships. Here she finished sixth in the final, equalling her personal best with 1.86 metres.

=== 2008 ===
In early 2008 she repeated her intention to qualify for the 2008 Olympics. She made her European Cup debut in the last edition of the competition, winning the Second League with 1.85 metres, and at the Norwegian Championships that year at Trondheim stadion, she won the gold medal in the high jump with 1.87 metres. This was a new personal best as well as a stadium record. She also finished fourth in the 200 metres event, and won a gold medal with her club in the Swedish relay. In the autumn of 2008 she moved to Oslo and enrolled at the Norwegian Police University College. She was reunited with Hanne Haugland as a coach, and joined the club IL i BUL from New Year's.

=== 2009 ===
In the 2009 indoor season she quickly equalled her personal best of 1.87 metres, during a meet in Gothenburg. At the Norwegian Indoor Championships she started by setting her first ever Norwegian record, in the standing high jump. Her new record was 1.53 metres, an improvement from 1.52 which had stood since 1984. After passing 1.53, she declined to continue the competition. She won the high jump event the next day, and also the standing long jump. Her 2.91 metres is only one centimetre behind the Norwegian record in that event; in fact she was only millimetres from achieving 2.92. In total, she has six national titles in the standing high jump (2002, 2005, 2006, 2007, 2008, 2009) and three in the standing long jump (2006, 2008, 2009). These are indoor only.

She competed at the 2009 European Indoor Championships. With 1.80 metres she failed to reach the final. In the early 2009 outdoor season, Kufaas made a definite breakthrough. She improved her personal best by four centimetres to 1.91 metres, winning for Norway at the 2009 European Team Championships First League. Norway surprisingly won promotion to the Super League, and Kufaas had achieved the qualifying standard for the 2009 World Championships. At the high jump competition there she failed to reach the final. She stated that she did not like the track of the Olympiastadion, comparing it to a sponge.

=== 2010 ===
She started the 2010 indoor season with a few mediocre competitions before leaping to 1.92 metres on 6 February in Eskilstuna. Two weeks later she won the 2010 Norwegian Indoor Championships in a new championship record (counted since 2004) of 1.87 metres. At the 2010 World Indoor Championships she managed 1.89 metres, but it was not enough to reach the final. In the outdoor season she jumped a personal best at a national competition at Lillehammer and qualified for the European Championships in Barcelona. Later she became again national champion in Stavanger (1.89m).

=== 2011 ===
Kufaas was less successful in the 2011 season which was hampered by neck problems. At the European Indoor Championships in Paris she jumped to 12th place with 1,89 m. In the outdoor season her best performance was 1,88 m achieved during a high jump meeting in Sollentuna, Sweden. She could not defend her indoor or outdoor national championships from 2010 and became second behind Tonje Angelsen in both events. Kufaas graduated from the Norwegian Police University College in 2011.
