= Irina Gordeeva =

Russian high jumper (born 1986)

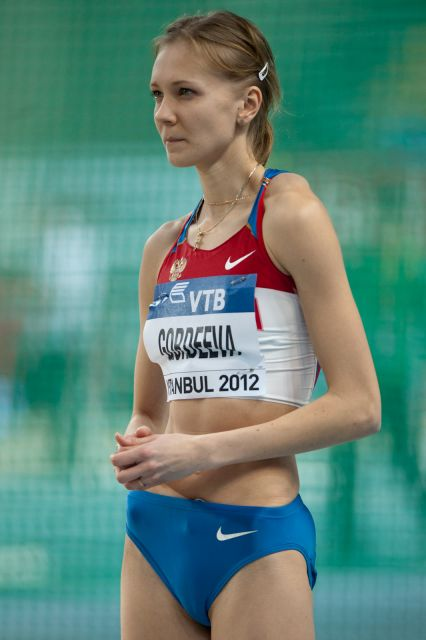
- Gordeeva at the 2012 World Indoor Championships

Personal information
- Nationality: Russian
- Born: 9 October 1986 (age 39) Saint Petersburg
- Height: 1.85 m (6 ft 1 in)
- Weight: 55 kg (121 lb)

Sport
- Country: Russia
- Sport: Women's athletics
- Event: High jump
Medal record
European Championships
Bronze medal – third place	2012 Helsinki	High jump

Irina Andreyevna Gordeeva (Russian: Ирина Андреевна Гордеева; born 9 October 1986 in St. Petersburg) is a Russian former high jumper.

She finished seventh at the 2003 World Youth Championships, ninth at the 2004 World Junior Championships, fifth at the 2009 European Indoor Championships and fifth at the 2009 World Athletics Final. She competed at the 2010 World Indoor Championships without reaching the final.

Gordeeva won a bronze medal at the 2012 European Athletics Championships in Helsinki on 28 June.

Her personal best is 2.04 metres, achieved in August 2012 in Eberstadt.

== Competition record ==
Year	Competition	Venue	Position	Notes
Representing Russia
2003	World Youth Championships	Sherbrooke, Canada	7th	1.75 m
2004	World Junior Championships	Grosseto, Italy	9th	1.80 m
2005	European Junior Championships	Kaunas, Lithuania	4th	1.82 m
2009	European Indoor Championships	Turin, Italy	5th	1.92 m
2010	World Indoor Championships	Doha, Qatar	10th (q)	1.89 m
2010	European Championships	Barcelona, Spain	13th (q)	1.90 m
2011	Universiade	Shenzhen, China	4th	1.86 m
2012	World Indoor Championships	Istanbul, Turkey	9th (q)	1.92 m
2012	European Championships	Helsinki, Finland	3rd	1.92 m
2012	Olympic Games	London, United Kingdom	10th	1.93 m
2013	World Championships	Moscow, Russia	9th	1.93 m
2014	World Indoor Championships	Sopot, Poland	13th (q)	1.92 m
Representing Authorised Neutral Athletes
2017	World Championships	London, United Kingdom	16th (q)	1.89 m
