= Olena Holosha =

Ukrainian high jumper

Personal information
- Born: 26 January 1982 (age 43)

Sport
- Country: Ukraine
- Sport: Track and field
- Event: High Jump

Olena Holosha (Ukrainian: Олена Холоша; born 26 January 1982) is a Ukrainian high jumper. Holosha won a bronze medal at the European Athletics championships in Helsinki by jumping a height of 1.92 m.

== Competition record ==
Year	Competition	Venue	Position	Notes
Representing Ukraine
1999	World Youth Championships	Bydgoszcz, Poland	6th	1.79 m
2000	World Junior Championships	Santiago, Chile	20th (q)	1.75 m
2003	Universiade	Daegu, South Korea	6th	1.88 m
2012	European Championships	Helsinki, Finland	3rd	1.92 m
2012	Olympic Games	London, United Kingdom	15th (q)	1.90 m
2013	European Indoor Championships	Gothenburg, Sweden	10th (q)	1.89 m
