= Anna Chicherova =

Russian high jumper

Anna Chicherova-Chernoval
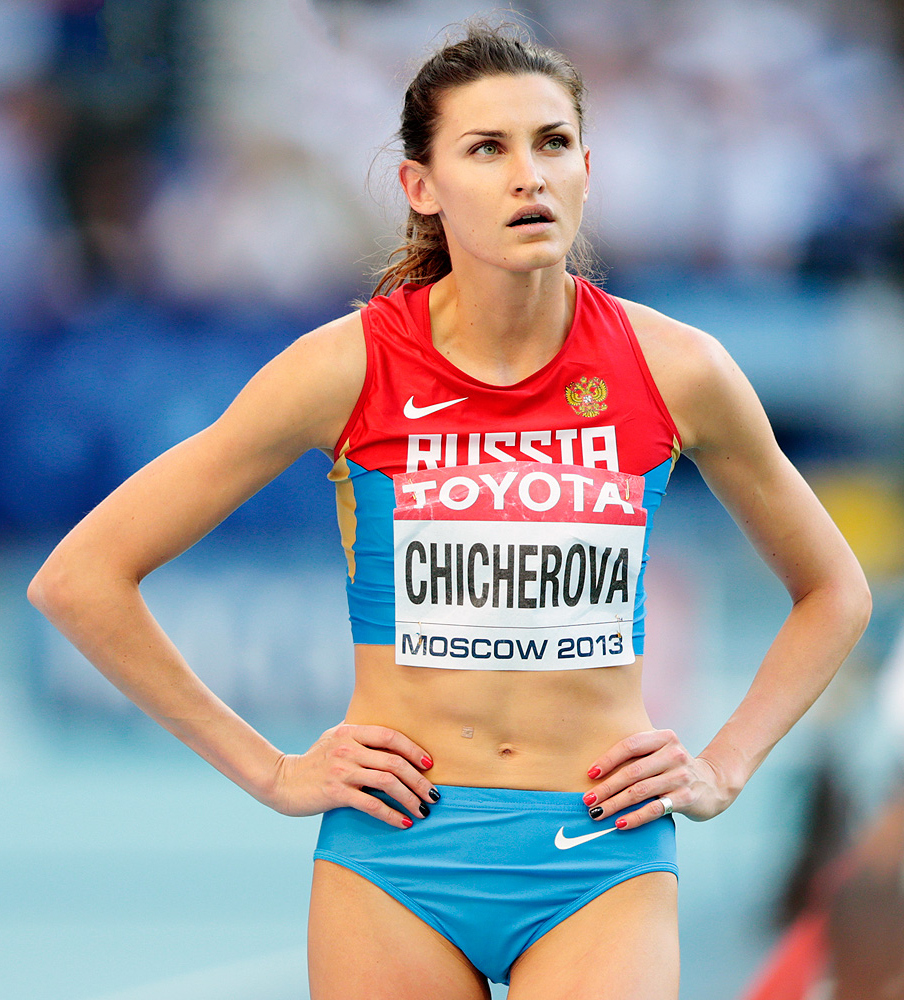
- Anna Chicherova at the 2013 World Championships

Personal information
- Born: 22 July 1982 (age 44) Yerevan, Armenian SSR, Soviet Union
- Height: 1.80 m (5 ft 11 in)
- Weight: 57 kg (126 lb)

Sport
- Country: Russia
- Club: CSKA Moscow
- Now coaching: Yevgeniy Zagorulko

Achievements and titles
- Olympic finals: 3rd (Beijing 2008) (DSQ), 1st (London 2012)
- World finals: 1st (Daegu 2011)
Medal record
Event	1st	2nd	3rd
Olympic Games	1	0	0
World Championships	1	2	1
World Indoor Championships	0	2	1
European Indoor Championships	1	0	0
Total	3	3	3
Olympic Games
Gold medal – first place	2012 London	High jump
Disqualified	2008 Beijing	High jump
World Championships
Gold medal – first place	2011 Daegu	High jump
Silver medal – second place	2007 Osaka	High jump
Disqualified	2009 Berlin	High jump
Silver medal – second place	2013 Moscow	High jump
Bronze medal – third place	2015 Beijing	High jump
World Indoor Championships
Silver medal – second place	2004 Budapest	High jump
Silver medal – second place	2012 Istanbul	High jump
Bronze medal – third place	2003 Birmingham	High jump
- Updated on 29 August 2015

Anna Vladimirovna Chicherova (Russian: Анна Владимировна Чичерова; born 22 July 1982) is a Russian high jumper. She was the gold medalist at the 2012 London Olympics and the 2011 World Championships in Athletics and was originally awarded a bronze medal in the event at the 2008 Summer Olympics, which was later stripped for doping. She was also runner-up at the World Championships in 2007 and 2013, as well as the bronze medalist in 2015.

In May 2016, it was reported that a retest of samples from the 2008 Games had found 31 positive findings for performance-enhancing drugs. One of those positive tests was admitted by her coach to belong to Chicherova. On 6 October 2016, the IOC confirmed that Chicherova had failed a doping test, due to the presence of turinabol in her 2008 sample, and stripped her of her bronze medal. The medal was ultimately reallocated to original 6th place finisher Chaunte Lowe, as the 4th and 5th place high jumpers in that final tested positive for their retests as well. Chicherova's World Championship silver medal was later stripped.

On 23 July 2018, the day after returning to a national competition to jump 1.90 m, the permission was granted, and Chicherova asked the IAAF to be able to participate in the 2018 European Athletics Championships.

At the beginning of 2019, she jumped 2.01 indoors twice, three days apart. At age 36, those jumps both equalled the Masters W35 World Record, though because they were indoors, they will not be recognized as the record.

In September 2019, Chicherova along with Elena Lashmanova was refused clearance for the IAAF World Athletics Championships.

== Biography ==
Chicherova was born in Yerevan and then moved to Belaya Kalitva, Russia, when the Soviet Union dissolved. She previously announced that she would retire after the 2013 World Championships in Moscow, after 14 years at the top, but has since continued to jump. After her second world silver in 2009, Chicherova announced her retirement, but after giving birth in 2010, she made her come back in 2011.

In 1999, she won her first major title when she was only 16, at the world youth championships in Bydgoszcz. Chicherova was among the world leading high jumpers for several years until she missed the 2010 season due to pregnancy. After returning in 2011 she established herself as the world leading female high jumper displacing Blanka Vlašić. Her personal best jump and the Russian national record is 2.07 metres, achieved on her 29th birthday at the Russian track and field championships of 2011. Her best indoors was achieved at the Hochsprung mit Musik meeting 2012 in Arnstadt with 2.06 m. She thereby improved her Russian indoor national record by two centimeters. Chicherova is among the top ten high jumpers of all time both indoor and outdoor.

Chicherova is currently in the athletics club based in Moscow, where she is coached by Yevgeni Zagorulko. She is married to Gennadiy Chernovol. She was absent for the 2010 season due to pregnancy and had her first child, Nika, in September that year.

With her victories in Daegu and London, Chicherova became only the third female high jumper in history (after Stefka Kostadinova & Heike Henkel) to win gold at both the Olympic Games and the World Championships.

== Achievements ==
Year	Competition	Venue	Position	Notes
1999	World Youth Championships	Bydgoszcz, Poland	1st	1.89 m
2000	World Junior Championships	Santiago, Chile	4th	1.85 m
2001	European Junior Championships	Grosseto, Italy	2nd	1.90 m
2001	Universiade	Beijing, China	8th	1.85 m
2003	World Indoor Championships	Birmingham, England	3rd	1.99 m (xo)
2003	World Championships	Paris, France	6th	1.95 m
2003	Military World Games	Catania, Italy	1st	1.89 m
2004	World Indoor Championships	Budapest, Hungary	2nd	2.00 m (xo)
2004	Olympic Games	Athens, Greece	6th	1.96 m
2004	World Athletics Final	Monte Carlo, Monaco	7th	1.92 m
2005	European Indoor Championships	Madrid, Spain	1st	2.01 m (xxo)
2005	Universiade	İzmir, Turkey	1st	1.90 m (xo)
2005	World Championships	Helsinki, Finland	4th	1.96 m (xxo)
2005	World Athletics Final	Monaco, Monaco	7th	1.89 m
2006	European Championships	Gothenburg, Sweden	7th	1.95 m (xo)
2006	World Athletics Final	Stuttgart, Germany	6th	1.90 m
2007	European Indoor Championships	Birmingham, England	6th	1.92 m (xo)
2007	World Championships	Osaka, Japan	2nd	2.03 m (xo)
2007	World Athletics Final	Stuttgart, Germany	3rd	1.97 m
2007	Military World Games	Hyderabad, India	2nd	1.96 m
2008	Olympic Games	Beijing, China	3rd (DSQ)	~~2.03 m (o)~~
2008	World Athletics Final	Stuttgart, Germany	2nd (DSQ)	~~1.99 m~~
2009	World Championships	Berlin, Germany	2nd (DSQ)	~~2.02 m (o)~~
2009	World Athletics Final	Thessaloniki, Greece	2nd (DSQ)	~~2.00 m (xo)~~
2011	World Championships	Daegu, South Korea	1st	2.03 m (o)
2011	Diamond League		2nd	details
2012	World Indoor Championships	Istanbul, Turkey	2nd	1.95 m (o)
2012	Olympic Games	London, United Kingdom	1st	2.05 m (xo)
2012	Diamond League		2nd	details
2013	World Championships	Moscow, Russia	2nd	1.97 m (o)
2013	Diamond League		2nd	details
2015	World Championships	Beijing, China	3rd	2.01 m (xo)
2015	Diamond League		3rd	details

== Personal bests ==
Type	Event	Best	Location	Date	Notes
Outdoor	High jump	2.07 m	Cheboksary, Russia	22 July 2011	3rd of all time
Indoor	High jump	2.06 m	Arnstadt, Germany	4 February 2012	3rd of all time

- Six-time Russian National High Jump Champion – 2004, 2007–2009, 2011–2012

== See also ==
- List of doping cases in athletics

Sporting positions
Preceded by Blanka Vlašić	Women's High Jump Best Year Performance; 2011–2012	Succeeded by Brigetta Barrett
Preceded by Brigetta Barrett	Women's High Jump Best Year Performance; 2014–2015	Succeeded by Chaunté Lowe
