= 2013 European Athletics Indoor Championships – Women's high jump =

The Women's high jump event at the 2013 European Athletics Indoor Championships was held on March 2, 2013, at 11:55 (qualification) and March 3, 2013, at 16:40 (final) local time.

== Records ==
Standing records prior to the 2013 European Athletics Indoor Championships
World record	Kajsa Bergqvist (SWE)	2.08	Arnstadt, Germany	4 February 2006
European record	Kajsa Bergqvist (SWE)	2.08	Arnstadt, Germany	4 February 2006
Championship record	Tia Hellebaut (BEL)	2.05	Birmingham, Great Britain	3 March 2005
World Leading	Alessia Trost (ITA)	2.00	Ancona, Italy	17 February 2013
European Leading	Alessia Trost (ITA)	2.00	Ancona, Italy	17 February 2013

== Results ==
=== Qualification ===
Qualification: Qualification Performance 1.94 (Q) or at least 8 best performers advanced to the final.

Rank	Athlete	Nationality	1.80	1.85	1.89	1.92	1.94	Result	Note
1	Ruth Beitia	Spain	–	o	o	o	-	1.92	q
1	Emma Green Tregaro	Sweden	–	o	o	o	-	1.92	q
1	Venelina Veneva-Mateeva	Bulgaria	o	o	o	o	-	1.92	q
4	Tia Hellebaut	Belgium	–	o	xo	o	-	1.92	q
5	Mirela Demireva	Bulgaria	o	o	o	xo	x-	1.92	q, PB
5	Ebba Jungmark	Sweden	o	o	o	xo	x-	1.92	q, =SB
7	Anna Iljuštšenko	Estonia	o	o	xxo	xo	xx-	1.92	q
8	Alessia Trost	Italy	o	o	xo	xxo	xxx	1.92	q
9	Melanie Melfort	France	o	xo	xo	xxo	xxx	1.92	
10	Olena Holosha	Ukraine	o	o	o	xxx		1.89	
11	My Nordström	Sweden	o	xo	o	xxx		1.89	
11	Ana Šimić	Croatia	o	xo	o	xxx		1.89	
13	Valeryia Bahdanovich	Belarus	o	o	xo	xxx		1.89	PB
14	Eleriin Haas	Estonia	xxo	xxo	xo	xxx		1.89	
15	Daniela Stanciu	Romania	o	o	xxx			1.85	
16	Iryna Herashchenko	Ukraine	xo	xo	xxx			1.85	
17	Kamila Stepaniuk	Poland	o	xxo	xxx			1.85	
18	Esthera Petre	Romania	o	-	xxr			1.80	
18	Kateryna Tabashnyk	Ukraine	o	xxx				1.80	

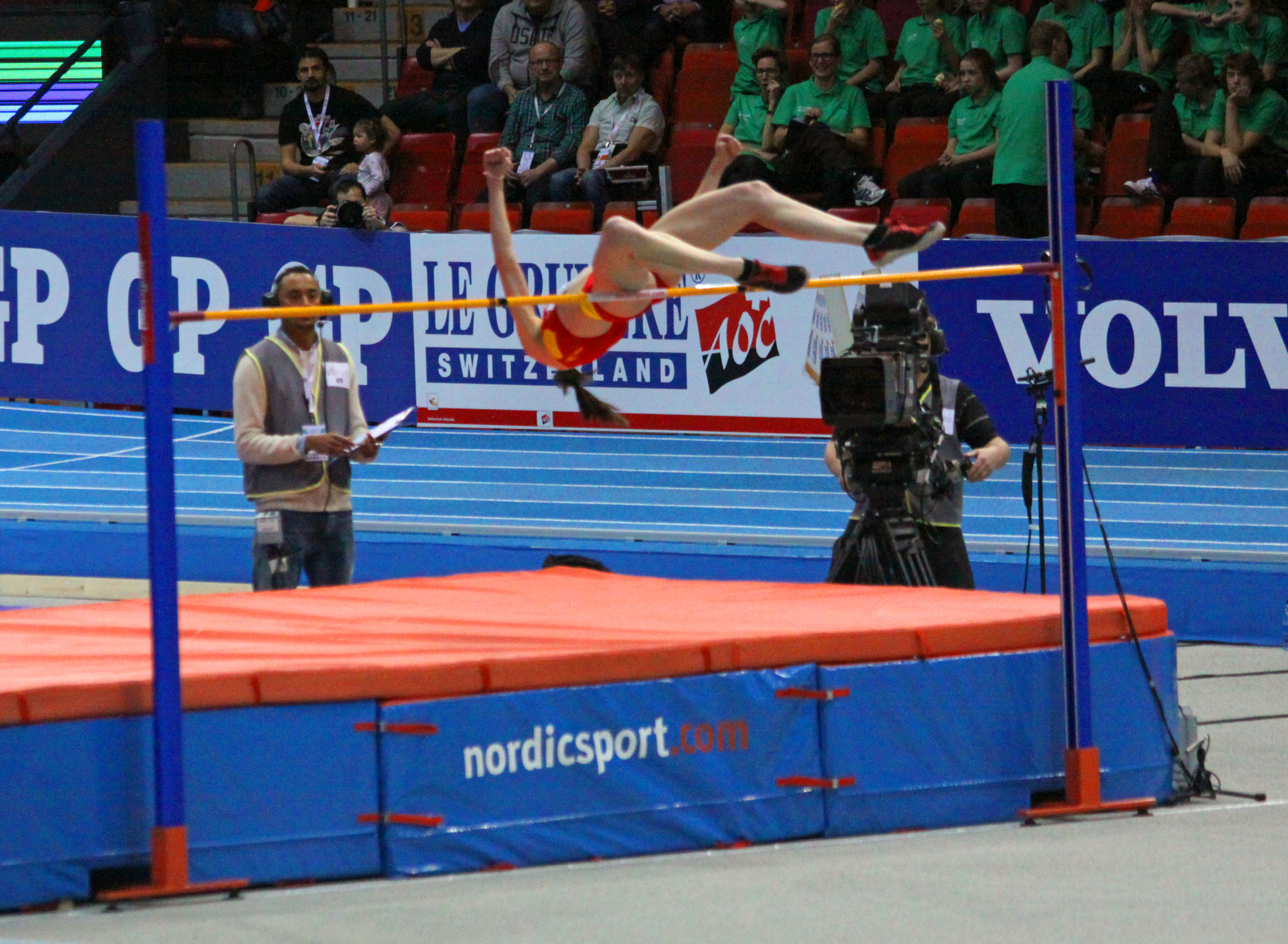
Winner Ruth Beitia at the final.

=== Final ===
The final was held at 16:40.

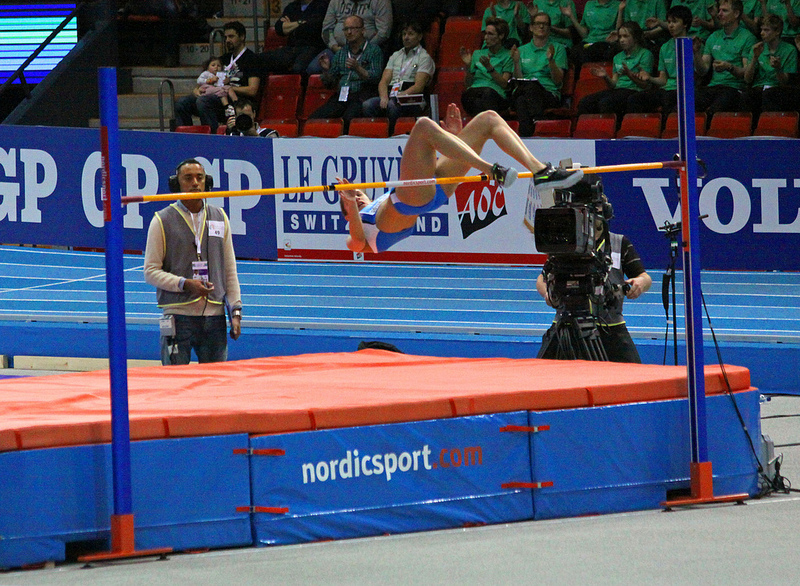
Alessia Trost in the final.

Rank	Athlete	Nationality	1.82	1.87	1.92	1.96	1.99	2.02	Result	Note
1st place, gold medalist(s)	Ruth Beitia	Spain	–	o	o	o	xo	xxx	1.99	SB
2nd place, silver medalist(s)	Ebba Jungmark	Sweden	o	o	o	o	xxx		1.96	=PB
3rd place, bronze medalist(s)	Emma Green Tregaro	Sweden	–	o	o	xo	xxx		1.96	SB
4	Anna Iljuštšenko	Estonia	o	o	o	xxx			1.92	
4	Alessia Trost	Italy	o	o	o	xxx			1.92	
6	Venelina Veneva-Mateeva	Bulgaria	o	xo	o	xxx			1.92	
7	Mirela Demireva	Bulgaria	o	o	xxx				1.87	
8	Tia Hellebaut	Belgium	o	xo	xxx				1.87	

== External list ==
- Official report
