= 2004 IAAF World Indoor Championships – Women's high jump =

The Women's high jump event at the 2004 IAAF World Indoor Championships was held on March 6–7.

== Medalists ==
Gold	Silver	Bronze
Elena Slesarenko; Russia	Anna Chicherova; Russia	Blanka Vlašić; Croatia

== Results ==
=== Qualification ===
Qualification: Qualification Performance 1.96 (Q) or at least 8 best performers advanced to the final.

Rank	Athlete	Nationality	1.81	1.86	1.90	1.93	1.96	Result	Notes
1	Vita Styopina	Ukraine	o	o	o	o	o	1.96	Q
1	Vita Palamar	Ukraine	–	o	o	o	o	1.96	Q
1	Anna Chicherova	Russia	o	o	o	o	o	1.96	Q
1	Elena Slesarenko	Russia	o	o	o	o	o	1.96	Q
5	Blanka Vlašić	Croatia	–	o	o	xo	xo	1.96	Q
5	Venelina Veneva	Bulgaria	o	o	o	xo	xo	1.96	Q, SB
7	Daniela Rath	Germany	–	–	o	o	xxo	1.96	Q
7	Marta Mendía	Spain	o	o	o	o	xxo	1.96	Q, PB
9	Ruth Beitia	Spain	o	xo	o	o	xxx	1.93	
10	Monica Iagăr	Romania	o	o	o	xxo	xxx	1.93	
11	Antonella Bevilacqua	Italy	o	o	o	xxx		1.90	
12	Petrina Price	Australia	o	o	xxx			1.86	
12	Romary Rifka	Mexico	o	o	xxx			1.86	SB
14	Oana Pantelimon	Romania	o	xo	xxx			1.86	
15	Zuzana Hlavoňová	Czech Republic	o	xxo	xxx			1.86	
16	Melanie Skotnik	Germany	xo	xxo	xxx			1.86	
	Tia Hellebaut	Belgium						DNS	

=== Final ===
Rank	Athlete	Nationality	1.82	1.87	1.91	1.94	1.97	2.00	2.02	2.04	2.08	Result	Notes
1st place, gold medalist(s)	Elena Slesarenko	Russia	o	o	o	o	o	xo	o	o	xx	2.04	WL
2nd place, silver medalist(s)	Anna Chicherova	Russia	o	o	o	o	xxo	xo	xx–	x		2.00	
3rd place, bronze medalist(s)	Blanka Vlašić	Croatia	–	o	–	o	o	xxx				1.97	
4	Vita Palamar	Ukraine	–	o	xxo	o	o	xxx				1.97	
5	Daniela Rath	Germany	–	o	o	o	xxo	xxx				1.97	
6	Marta Mendía	Spain	o	o	xo	xo	xxx					1.94	
7	Venelina Veneva	Bulgaria	o	xxo	o	xo	xxx					1.94	
8	Vita Styopina	Ukraine	o	xo	o	xxx						1.91	
