= 2010 IAAF World Indoor Championships – Women's high jump =

The women's high jump at the 2010 IAAF World Indoor Championships was held at the ASPIRE Dome on 12 and 13 March.

== Medalists ==
Gold	Silver	Bronze
Blanka Vlašić; Croatia	Ruth Beitia; Spain	Chaunte Howard Lowe; United States

== Records ==
Standing records prior to the 2010 IAAF World Indoor Championships
World record	Kajsa Bergqvist (SWE)	2.08	Arnstadt, Germany	4 February 2006
Championship record	Stefka Kostadinova (BUL)	2.05	Indianapolis, United States	8 March 1987
World Leading	Blanka Vlašić (CRO)	2.06	Arnstadt, Germany	6 February 2010
African record	Hestrie Cloete (RSA)	1.97	Birmingham, Great Britain	18 February 2001
Asian record	Svetlana Zalevskaya (KAZ)	1.98	Samara, Russia	2 March 1996
European record	Kajsa Bergqvist (SWE)	2.08	Arnstadt, Germany	4 February 2006
North and Central American and Caribbean record	Ioamnet Quintero (CUB)	2.01	Berlin, Germany	5 March 1993
North and Central American and Caribbean record	Tisha Waller (USA)	2.01	Atlanta, United States	28 February 1998
Oceanian Record	Alison Inverarity (AUS)	1.97	Toronto, Canada	13 March 1993
South American record	Solange Witteveen (ARG)	1.94	Brno, Czech Republic	9 February 2000

== Qualification standards ==
Indoor
1.92 m

== Schedule ==
Date	Time	Round
March 12, 2010	9:30	Qualification
March 13, 2010	17:05	Final

== Results ==
=== Qualification ===
Qualification: Qualifying Performance 1.95 (Q) or at least 8 best performers (q) advance to the final.

Rank	Athlete	Nationality	1.81	1.85	1.89	1.92	Result	Notes
1	Blanka Vlašić	Croatia	-	o	o	o	1.92	q
1	Ruth Beitia	Spain	-	o	o	o	1.92	q
1	Marina Aitova	Kazakhstan	o	o	o	o	1.92	q
4	Iva Straková	Czech Republic	o	o	xo	o	1.92	q, SB
5	Svetlana Shkolina	Russia	o	o	o	xo	1.92	q
5	Emma Green	Sweden	-	o	o	xo	1.92	q
7	Zheng Xingjuan	China	xo	o	o	xo	1.92	q, SB
8	Nadiya Dusanova	Uzbekistan	o	o	xo	xxo	1.92	q
9	Chaunte Howard Lowe	United States	o	xo	xo	xxo	1.92	q
10	Anna Iljuštšenko	Estonia	o	o	o	xxx	1.89	
10	Stine Kufaas	Norway	o	o	o	xxx	1.89	
10	Irina Gordeeva	Russia	o	o	o	xxx	1.89	
13	Petrina Price	Australia	o	o	xxx		1.85	
13	Meike Kröger	Germany	o	o	xxx		1.85	
15	Olena Demydova	Ukraine	xo	o	xxx		1.85	
16	Airinė Palšytė	Lithuania	xxo	o	xxx		1.85	
17	Vikki Hubbard	Great Britain	o	xo	xxx		1.85	
17	Deirdre Ryan	Ireland	o	xo	xxx		1.85	
19	Venelina Veneva-Mateeva	Bulgaria	o	xxo	xxx		1.85	
20	Anna Ustinova	Kazakhstan	o	xxx			1.81	

=== Final ===
Rank	Athlete	Nationality	1.83	1.87	1.91	1.94	1.96	1.98	2.00	2.05	Result	Notes
1st place, gold medalist(s)	Blanka Vlašić	Croatia	-	o	o	-	o	o	o	xxx	2.00	
2nd place, silver medalist(s)	Ruth Beitia	Spain	-	o	o	xo	xo	o	xxx		1.98	
3rd place, bronze medalist(s)	Chaunte Howard Lowe	United States	o	-	o	xo	o	xo	xxx		1.98	SB
4	Svetlana Shkolina	Russia	-	o	o	o	xo	xxx			1.96	
5	Emma Green	Sweden	-	o	xxo	xxo	xxx				1.94	
5	Zheng Xingjuan	China	o	xo	xo	xxo	xxx				1.94	NR
7	Nadiya Dusanova	Uzbekistan	o	o	o	xxx					1.91	
7	Marina Aitova	Kazakhstan	o	o	o	xxx					1.91	
9	Iva Straková	Czech Republic	o	xo	xxo	xxx					1.91	
