= Burcu Yüksel =

Turkish high jumper

Burcu Ayhan Yüksel
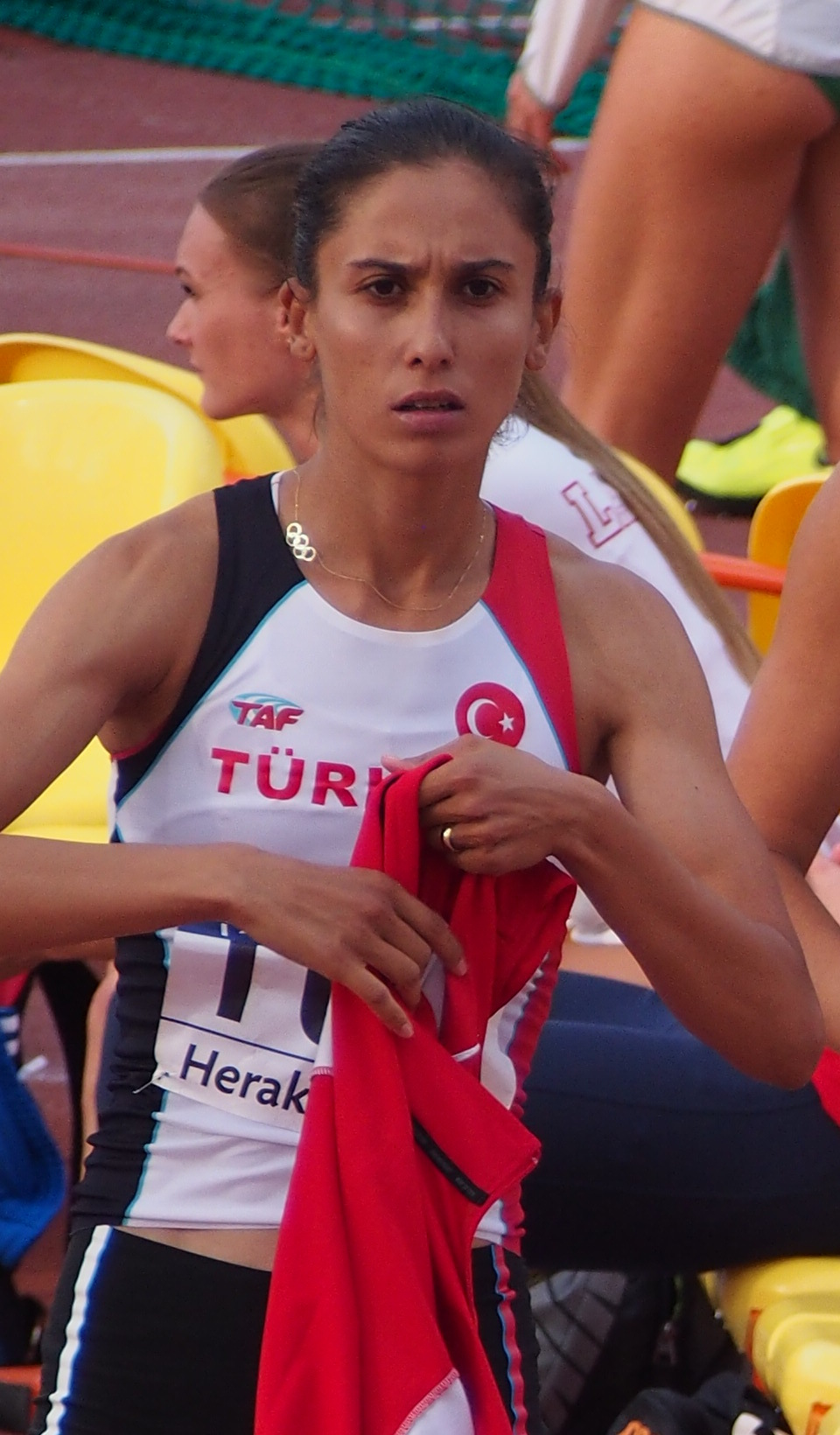
- Burcu Yüksel during 2015 European Team Championships First League

Personal information
- Nationality: Turkish
- Born: 3 May 1990 (age 36) Kadirli, Osmaniye Province, Turkey
- Height: 180 cm (5 ft 11 in)
- Weight: 57 kg (126 lb)

Sport
- Country: Turkey
- Sport: Athletics
- Event: High jump
- Club: Fenerbahçe Athletics
- Coached by: Cüneyt Yüksel

Achievements and titles
- Personal bests: outdoor: 1.94 m NR (2011) indoor:1.88 m (2012)
Medal record
Islamic Solidarity Games
Gold medal – first place	2013 Palembang	high jump
Mediterranean Games
Gold medal – first place	2013 Mersin	high jump
Silver medal – second place	2009 Pescara	high jump
European Junior Championships
Bronze medal – third place	2009 Novi Sad	high jump
European U23 Championships
Bronze medal – third place	2011 Ostrava	high jump

Burcu Yüksel (née Ayhan; pronounced [ˈbuɾdʒu ˈajhan]; born 3 May 1990 in Kadirli, Osmaniye Province) is a Turkish female high jumper. She is a member of Fenerbahçe Athletics club, where she is coached by Cüneyt Yüksel. The 180 cm (5 ft 11 in) tall athlete is at 57 kg (126 lb).

== Biography ==
She earned the gold medal at the 2007 Black Sea Games and the silver medal at the 2009 Mediterranean Games. Ayhan was the bronze medalist at the 2009 European Athletics Junior Championships held in Novi Sad, Serbia. She became gold medalist at the 64th Balkan Championships held in Sliven, Bulgaria. At the 2011 European U23 Championships held in Ostrava, Czech Republic, she jumped 1.94 m high breaking new national record, and earned the bronze medal.

She participated at the 2012 Summer Olympics.

She won a gold medal at the 3rd Islamic Solidarity Games in Palembang, Indonesia.

== Achievements ==
Year	Competition	Venue	Position	Notes
2007	Black Sea Games	Trabzon, Turkey	1st	
2008	World Junior Championships	Bydgoszcz, Poland	10th	1.78 m
2009	16th Mediterranean Games	Pescara, Italy	2nd	1.89 m
2009	European Junior Championships	Novi Sad, Serbia	3rd	1.89 m
2010	European Championships	Barcelona, Spain	9th	1.92 m
2011	64th Balkan Championships	Sliven, Bulgaria	1st	1.86 m
2011	European U23 Championships	Ostrava, Czech Republic	3rd	1.94 m NR
2012	Olympic Games	London, UK	12th	1.89 m
2013	17th Mediterranean Games	Mersin, Turkey	1st	1.92
2013	3rd Islamic Solidarity Games	Palembang, Indonesia	1st	1.80
