= Oksana Okunyeva =

Ukrainian high jumper (born 1990)

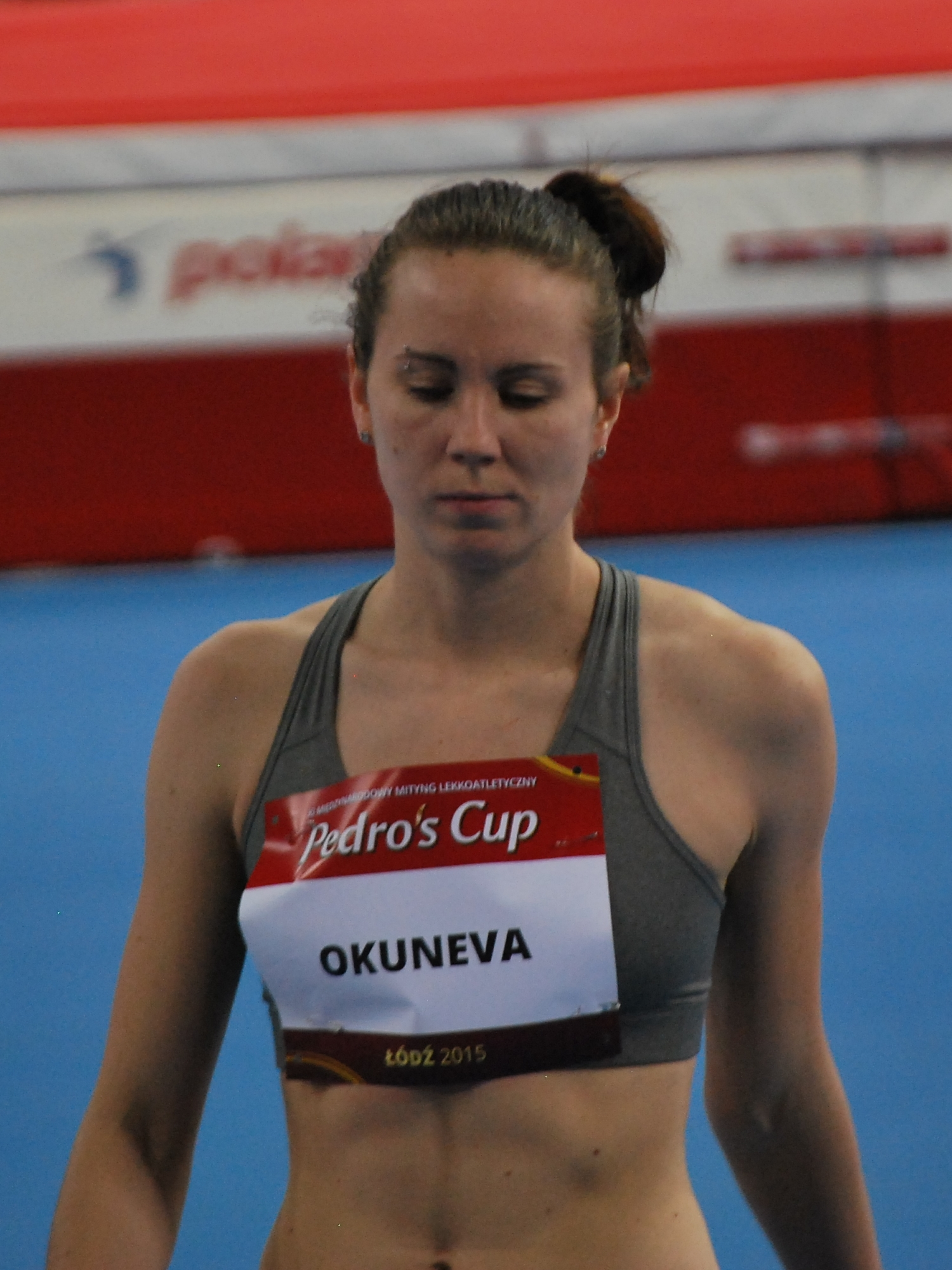
- Okunyeva in 2015

Personal information
- Born: March 14, 1990 (age 36) Mykolaiv, Ukrainian SSR, Soviet Union
- Height: 1.75 m (5 ft 9 in)
- Weight: 63 kg (139 lb)

Sport
- Country: Ukraine
- Sport: Athletics
- Event: High jump
- Coached by: Iljin A.S.
Medal record
Women's athletics
Representing Ukraine
Universiade
Gold medal – first place	2017 Taipei	High jump
European Team Championships
Silver medal – second place	2014 Braunschweig	High jump
European U23 Championships
Silver medal – second place	2011 Ostrava	High jump
European Youth Olympic Festival
Bronze medal – third place	2007 Belgrade	High jump

Oksana Okunyeva (Ukrainian: Оксана Григорівна Окунєва; also transliterated Okuneva or Okunieva, born 14 March 1990 in Mykolaiv) is a Ukrainian high jumper.it

She won the silver medal at the European U23 Championships in Ostrava, Czech Republic, and finished first at the World Challenge Hengelo in the Netherlands.

Her personal best jump is 1.98 metres, achieved in Berdychiv on 28 June 2014 at the Memorial of Vitaliy Lonsky.

== International competitions ==
Year	Competition	Venue	Position	Notes
Representing Ukraine
2007	World Youth Championships	Ostrava, Czech Republic	6th	1.78 m
2007	European Youth Olympic Festival	Belgrade, Serbia	3rd	1.77 m
2009	European Athletics Junior Championships	Novi Sad, Serbia	6th	1.80 m
2011	European Indoor Championships	Paris, France	7th	1.92 m
2011	European U23 Championships	Ostrava, Czech Republic	2nd	1.94 m
2011	Universiade	Shenzhen, China	8th	1.84 m
2012	World Indoor Championships	Istanbul, Turkey	17th (q)	1.83 m
2013	World Championships	Moscow, Russia	15th (q)	1.88 m
2014	European Championships	Zürich, Switzerland	6th	1.94 m
2015	World Championships	Beijing, China	14th (q)	1.89 m
2016	European Championships	Amsterdam, Netherlands	6th	1.89 m
2016	Olympic Games	Rio de Janeiro, Brazil	22nd (q)	1.89 m
2017	European Indoor Championships	Belgrade, Serbia	4th	1.92 m
2017	World Championships	London, United Kingdom	20th (q)	1.89 m
2017	Universiade	Taipei, Taiwan	1st	1.97 m
2017	DécaNation	Angers, France	1st	1.88 m
2018	European Championships	Berlin, Germany	10th	1.87 m
