= Esthera Petre =

Romanian high jumper

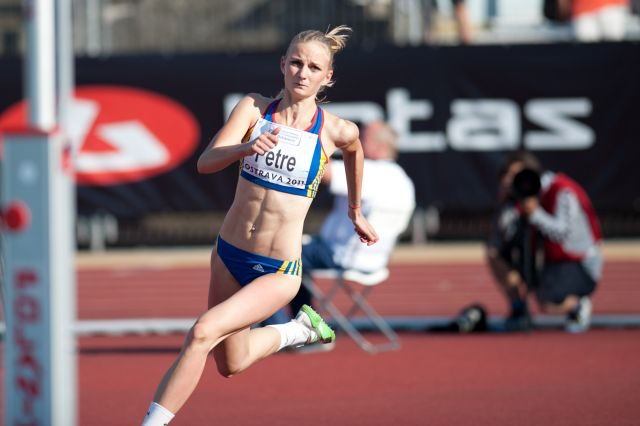
Esthera Petre (2011)

Esthera Petre (born 13 May 1990, Bucharest) is a Romanian high jumper. She competed at the 2012 Summer Olympics.

== Achievements ==
Year	Competition	Venue	Position	Notes
Representing Romania
2006	World Junior Championships	Beijing, China	14th (q)	1.81 m
2007	World Youth Championships	Ostrava, Czech Republic	5th	1.81 m
2008	World Junior Championships	Bydgoszcz, Poland	6th	1.82 m
2009	European Indoor Championships	Turin, Italy	14th (q)	1.80 m
2009	European Junior Championships	Novi Sad, Serbia	5th	1.84 m
2011	European Indoor Championships	Paris, France	16th (q)	1.85 m
2011	European U23 Championships	Ostrava, Czech Republic	1st	1.98 m
2011	World Championships	Daegu, South Korea	14th (q)	1.92 m
2012	World Indoor Championships	Istanbul, Turkey	7th	1.92 m
2013	European Indoor Championships	Gothenburg, Sweden	18th (q)	1.80 m
