= Anne Gerd Eieland =

Norwegian high jumper

Anne Gerd Eieland (born 28 December 1982) from Iveland Municipality in Agder is Norway's third best female high jumper of all time, behind Hanne Haugland and Tonje Angelsen. Eieland was undefeated in Norwegian competition from 2001 to 2005.

She was brought up in her teenage years by Torstein Bærheim, who was her trainer for many years, and who took Eieland to record level in 2003. She later found a new trainer, and in winter 2006, Hanne Haugland came in as Eieland's new mentor.

Eieland's first major senior championship was the 2003 World Championships in Paris. At the 2006 European Championships in Gothenburg, she failed to clear the opening height of 1.78 metres, and finished without a result.

== Personal records ==
- High jump: 1.93 m (2003)
- Triple jump 13.13 m
- Indoors: 1.92 m (Kristiansand, 21 January 2007)

== Norwegian Championships ==
- Gold in 2001, 2002, 2003, 2004, 2005 and 2007.
- Silver in 2000 (behind Hanne Haugland) and 2006.

== Articles on Eieland ==
- Eieland clears barrier
- Eieland seeks expert help
- The training discovery when she jumped into the pigs
