= Tonje Angelsen =

Norwegian high jumper (born 1990)

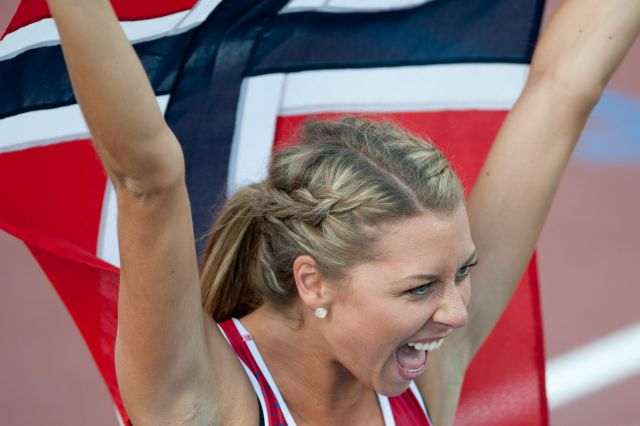
- Angelsen after winning the silver medal at the 2012 European Championships

Personal information
- Born: 17 January 1990 (age 36) Trondheim, Norway
- Height: 1.79 m (5 ft 10 in)

Sport
- Country: Norway
- Club: Trondheim Friidrett
- Now coaching: by Roger Hollup

Achievements and titles
- Personal bests: High jump (outdoor): 1.97 m High jump (indoor): 1.93 m
Medal record
European Championships
| Silver medal – second place | 2012 Helsinki | High jump |

Tonje Angelsen (born 17 January 1990) is a Norwegian high jumper. Angelsen was considered a promising high jumper when she set a Norwegian age record at 1.82 m at the age of 16 in 2006. Her career stalled somewhat because of injury until 2009. In 2010 and 2011, she qualified for several international championships but did not make it to the finals. In January 2012, she managed a personal best of 1.93 m indoors. At meeting in Oslo on 24 May she jumped to a new personal best outdoors of 1.95 m which was also the qualifying height for the 2012 Summer Olympics in London.

On 28 June 2012 she won a silver medal at the 2012 European Athletics Championships in Helsinki by jumping a height of 1.97 m, a new personal best.

== Competition record ==
| Year | Competition | Venue | Position | Notes |
Representing Norway
| 2006 | World Junior Championships | Beijing, China | 22nd (q) | 1.74 m |
| 2008 | World Junior Championships | Bydgoszcz, Poland | 28th (q) | 1.70 m |
| 2009 | European Junior Championships | Novi Sad, Serbia | 16th (q) | 1.73 m |
| 2010 | European Championships | Barcelona, Spain | 20th (q) | 1.87 m |
| 2011 | European Indoor Championships | Paris, France | 10th (q) | 1.92 m |
| 2011 | European U23 Championships | Ostrava, Czech Republic | 4th | 1.92 m |
| 2011 | World Championships | Daegu, South Korea | 23rd (q) | 1.85 m |
| 2012 | World Indoor Championships | Istanbul, Turkey | 15th (q) | 1.88 m |
| 2012 | European Championships | Helsinki, Finland | 2nd | 1.97 m |
| 2012 | Olympic Games | London, United Kingdom | 28th (q) | 1.85 m |
| 2014 | European Championships | Zürich, Switzerland | 9th | 1.90 m |
| 2016 | Olympic Games | Rio de Janeiro, Brazil | 32nd (q) | 1.80 m |
| 2018 | European Championships | Berlin, Germany | 24th (q) | 1.81 m |
| 2019 | European Indoor Championships | Glasgow, United Kingdom | 14th (q) | 1.89 m |
