= Svetlana Shkolina =

Russian high jumper

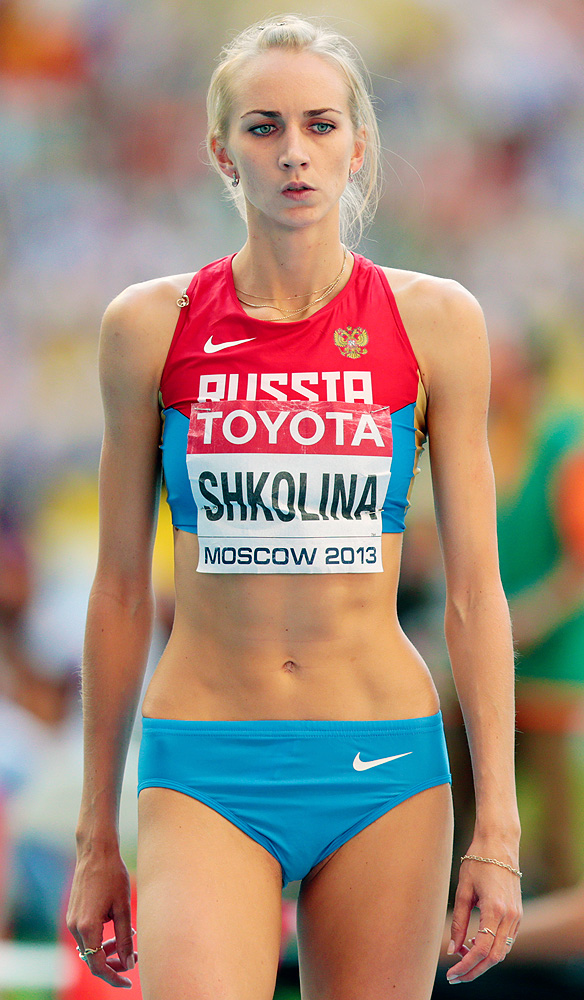
- Shkolina at the 2013 World Championships

Personal information
- Born: March 9, 1986 (age 40) Yartsevo, Smolensk, USSR
- Height: 1.87 m (6 ft 2 in)
- Weight: 66 kg (146 lb)
Medal record
Women's athletics
Representing Russia
Olympic Games
Disqualified	2012 London	High jump
World Championships
Disqualified	2013 Moscow	High jump

Svetlana Vladimirovna Shkolina (Russian: Светлана Владимировна Школина; born 9 March 1986) is a Russian high jumper.

== Early career ==
Shkolina was born in Yartsevo. As a teenager she won the silver medals at the 2003 World Youth Championships and the 2004 World Junior Championships and the gold medal at the 2005 European Junior Championships. Her personal bests were 1.88 metres in 2003 (Krasnodar, May), 1.91 metres in 2004 (Grosseto, WJC, July), and 1.92 metres in 2005 (Mannheim, June). In 2007, she won another gold medal, at the 2007 European U23 Championships, where both Shkolina and Adonia Steryiou cleared 1.92 metres but failed at 1.95 metres. She also improved her personal best to 1.96 metres in Tula in June 2007, having only managed to equal 1.92 metres during the 2006 season.

== Senior career ==
=== 2008–2009 ===
Shkolina's first major international senior championship was the 2008 Summer Olympics, where she finished fourteenth with a jump of 1.93 metres. Her season's best was 1.98 metres, achieved in July in Kazan. In 2009, she equalled this height in January in Rijeka before finishing fourth at the 2009 European Indoor Championships. She finished fourth again at the 2009 European Team Championships by equalling her personal best for the third time in the Super League competition in Leiria. At the 2009 World Championships and the 2009 World Athletics Final she finished sixth, with 1.96 and 1.94 metres respectively.

=== 2010–2011 ===
In early 2010, Shkolina broke the 2-metre barrier as she cleared 2.00 metres at the Hochsprung mit Musik event in Arnstadt in February. She contended with Blanka Vlašić who eventually set a world-leading mark of 2.06 metres. In the next three international championships she finished in fourth place: in March 2010 at the World Indoor Championships in Doha (1.96 m), in August at the European Championships in Barcelona (1.97 m), and in March 2011 at the European Indoor Championships in Paris (1.92 m). In July she beat Vlašić at the high jump meeting in Eberstadt. Shkolina managed 1.99 m, while Vlašić stopped at 1.97 m.

=== 2012–2013 ===
Shkolina initially won the bronze medal in the high jump at the 2012 Summer Olympics with a height of 2.03 m. She initially won the gold medal in the high jump at the 2013 World Championships in Athletics in Moscow, equalling her personal best with a height of 2.03 m.

=== Doping ===
In February 2019, Shkolina was banned for four years for doping starting from 1 February 2019. On appeal, her ban was reduced from four years to two years and nine months, with all her results from 16 July 2012 to 31 December 2014 disqualified, including her 2012 Olympic bronze medal and her 2013 World Championships gold medal.

== International competitions ==
Representing Russia
Year	Competition	Venue	Position	Result	Notes
2003	World Youth Championships	Sherbrooke, Canada	2nd	1.84 m	
2003	European Youth Olympics	Paris, France	2nd	1.84 m	
2004	World Junior Championships	Grosseto, Italy	2nd	1.91 m	
2005	European Junior Championships	Kaunas, Lithuania	1st	1.91 m	
2007	European U23 Championships	Debrecen, Hungary	1st	1.92 m	
2009	World Championships	Berlin, Germany	5th	1.96 m	
2010	World Indoor Championships	Doha, Qatar	4th	1.96 m	
2010	European Championships	Barcelona, Spain	4th	1.97 m	
2011	European Indoor Championships	Paris, France	4th	1.92 m	
2011	World Championships	Daegu, South Korea	4th	1.97 m	
2012	Olympic Games	London, United Kingdom	—	2.03 m	DSQ (3rd)
2012	Diamond League		3rd	details	
2013	World Championships	Moscow, Russia	—	2.03 m	DSQ (1st)
2013	Diamond League		1st	details	

== See also ==
- List of doping cases in athletics
