= Chaunté Lowe =

American high jumper

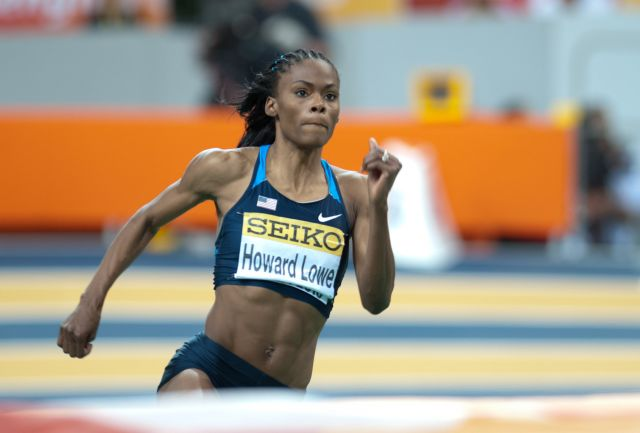
- Chaunté Lowe in Doha 2010

Personal information
- Nationality: United States
- Born: Chaunté Howard; January 12, 1984 (age 42) California
- Height: 5 ft 9 in (1.75 m)
- Weight: 131 lb (59 kg)

Sport
- Sport: Track and field
- Events: High jump, long jump
- College team: Georgia Tech
- Club: Nike
- Coached by: Mario Lowe

Achievements and titles
- Personal bests: High jump: 2.05 m (Des Moines, 2010); High jump (indoor): 2.02 m (Albuquerque, 2012)
Medal record
Women's athletics
Representing the United States
Olympic Games
Bronze medal – third place	2008 Beijing	High jump
World Championships
Silver medal – second place	2005 Helsinki	High jump
World Indoor Championships
Gold medal – first place	2012 Istanbul	High jump
Bronze medal – third place	2010 Doha	High jump
Pan American Junior Championships
Bronze medal – third place	2003 Bridgetown	High jump

Chaunté Lowe (née Howard; born January 12, 1984) is an American athlete who competes in the high jump. A four-time Olympian (2004, 2008, 2012 and 2016), she is the 2008 Olympic bronze medalist, the 2005 World Championship silver medalist and the 2012 World Indoor gold medalist. She initially finished sixth in the 2008 Olympic high jump final, but was promoted to the bronze medal in 2016 after three competitors were disqualified for doping. She is the American record holder in the women's high jump with an outdoor clearance of 2.05 m in 2010, and holds the indoor record with a clearance of 2.02 m in 2012.

== Career ==
=== Early career ===
Lowe graduated from John W. North High School in Riverside, California, where she won the National Scholastic Indoor Championships twice. She won the 2001 CIF California State Meet in the high jump and finished second in 2002 in the high jump, long jump and triple jump, leading her team to the state team championships. Among her first successes was a high jump bronze medal at the 2003 Pan American Junior Athletics Championships.

=== 2004 Summer Olympics ===
Lowe jumped 1.85 m in the qualifying round of the women's high jump at the 2004 Summer Olympics and did not reach the final.

=== 2005 IAAF World Championships ===
In the qualifying round, Lowe tied with Iryna Mykhalchenko for second in her group with a height of 1.93 m. In the final, Lowe placed second behind Kajsa Bergqvist, who jumped 2.02 m, with a height of 2.00 m.

=== 2008 Summer Olympics ===
Lowe jumped 1.93 m in the qualifying round at the 2008 Summer Olympics to reach the final. She initially placed sixth in the high jump final with a height of 1.99 m. In late 2016, the International Olympic Committee stripped Russians Anna Chicherova and Yelena Slesarenko and Ukrainian Vita Palamar of their placements ahead of Lowe due to positive tests for banned drugs, resulting in Lowe being awarded the bronze medal for the event.

=== 2009-2010 ===
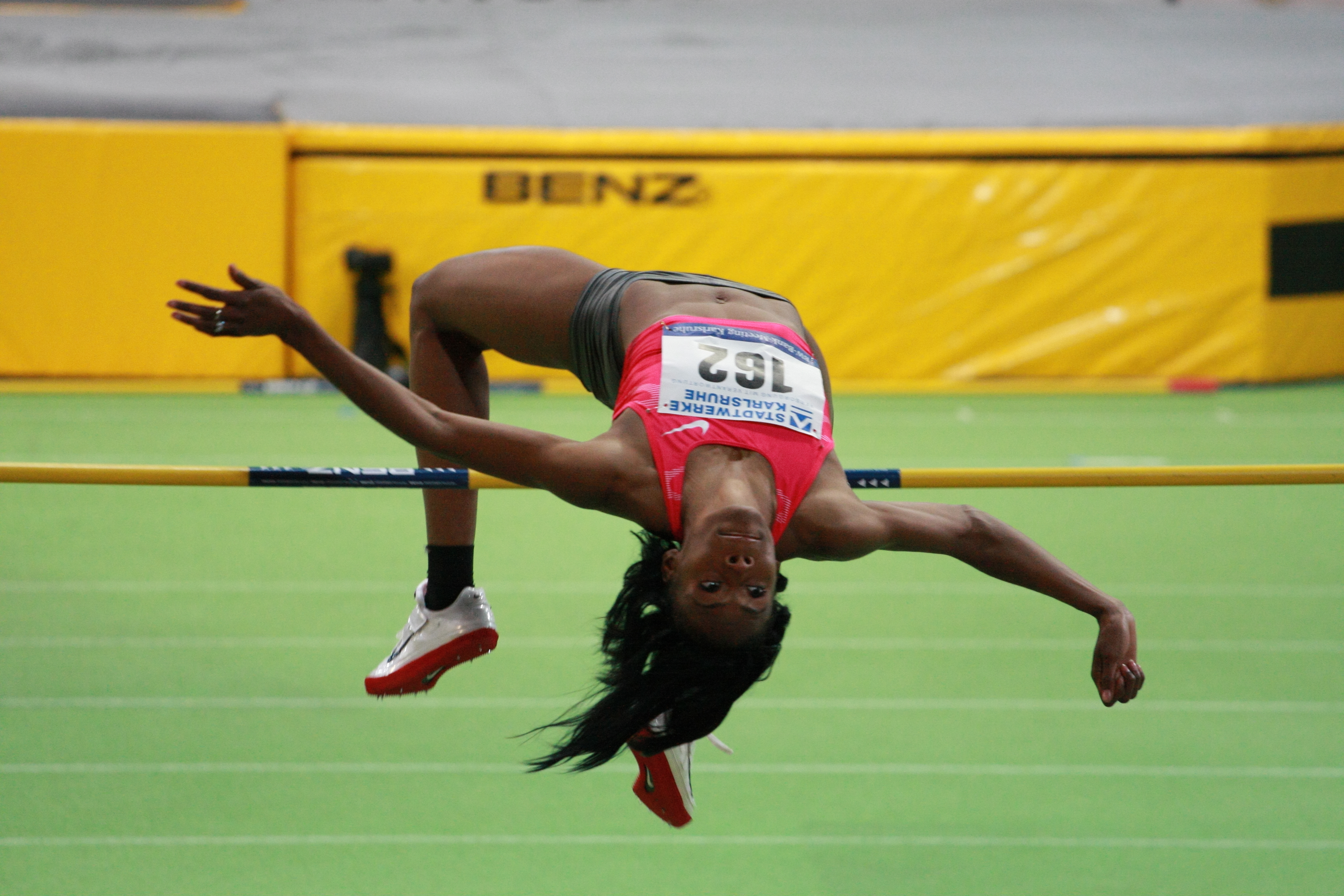
Chaunte Howard-Lowe 2010

Competing in 2009, she became the national champion with a clearance of 1.95 m at the 2009 USA Outdoor Track and Field Championships, beating Amy Acuff to the title on countback. This gained her qualification into the 2009 World Championships in Athletics: she reached the 2009 high jump final, but she could not repeat her past medal performance and finished in seventh place. She closed the year with a fourth-place finish at the last edition of the World Athletics Final.

Lowe improved her indoor best with a jump of 1.98 m at the USA Indoor Track and Field Championships in 2010. She attempted to tie with Tisha Waller's record, but just knocked the bar at the last moment. At the 2010 IAAF World Indoor Championships, she won a bronze medal in the high jump with a clearance of 1.98 m.

On May 30, 2010, Lowe broke Louise Ritter's American record of 2.03 m set in 1988 with a clearance of 2.04 m in Cottbus, Germany. Less than a month later, on June 26, 2010, she improved her record with a clearance of 2.05 m in Des Moines, Iowa.

=== 2012 ===
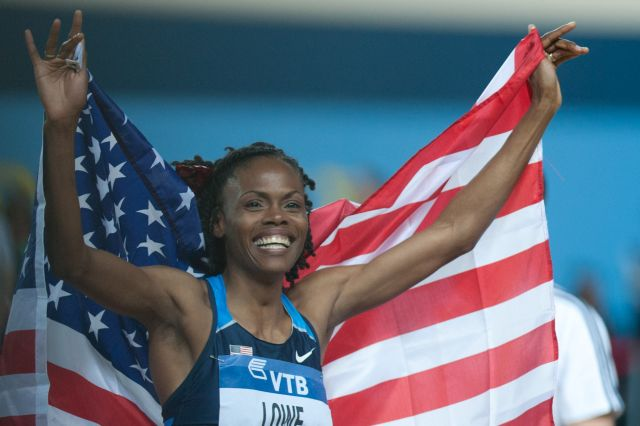
Lowe celebrating her win at the 2012 World Indoor Championships

Lowe capped a successful 2012 Indoor season by winning the USA Indoor Championship at Albuquerque, New Mexico, on February 26, with a new national record of 2.02 m (6 ft 8 in): That broke the American indoor, and Championship meet, mark of 2.01 (6' 7.25") established at the 1998 USA Indoor Championship meet by Tisha Waller. Lowe won the competition as the only jumper to clear 1.93 (6'4"), then went on to clear 1.96, 1.99, scaled 2.02 on her third attempt, and made three attempts at 2.04. She set a meet record at the Drake Relays in April with a jump of 1.98 m. On March 10, she topped this successful indoor season by becoming World Indoor Champion at the IAAF World Indoor Championships on in Istanbul being the only one to clear 1.98 m.

At the Summer Olympics, she again reached the final and again finished in 6th place, a result she found disappointing because she was one of the favourites.

=== 2014 ===
Back from pregnancy for the 3rd time in 2013, Lowe was the runner-up in the high jump in 1.94 meters at 2014 USA Outdoor Track and Field Championships but then was awarded as the winner because Inika McPherson was disqualified for doping. At the 2014 IAAF Continental Cup, Lowe took 2nd place behind Mariya Kuchina (1.99 m) in a season's best of 1.97 m. Lowe won the high jump in 1.91 meters at 2015 USA Outdoor Track and Field Championships. Her results were less great as the other years because she needed to help her second daughter who has autism. She participated at the World championships but failed to clear the first bar at 1.80 m.

=== 2016 : back to the top ===
During the indoor season, Lowe came back to the great heights and cleared a season's best at 1.95 m in Albuquerque. She finished 3rd at the US Indoor Championships with a 1.93 meters' clearance.

Back outdoors, she jumped a WL of 1.93 m in February, then won the Ibero-American title with a 1.96 m clearance. On July 3, she qualifies for her 4th Olympic team by winning the 2016 Olympic Trials with 2.01 m, tying her own trials record. She jumped a WL.

== Personal life ==
She took a year off from competition in 2007 and gave birth to her daughter, Jasmine. Another daughter was born in April 2011. She is married to Mario Lowe, a triple jumper. She graduated from Georgia Institute of Technology in May 2008.

In 2012, she was attending Western Governors University online for a master's degree.

In 2019, she was diagnosed with triple negative breast cancer and underwent a double mastectomy and chemotherapy to treat the disease. She was awarded the NCAA Inspiration Award in 2021 for continuing to share her story in order to raise awareness and provide hope for others.

== Personal bests ==
Event	Best (m)	Venue	Date
High jump (outdoor)	2.05 AR, NR	Des Moines, Iowa	June 26, 2010
High jump (indoor)	2.02 AR, NR	Albuquerque, New Mexico	February 26, 2012

Key: AR = Area record, NR = National record

== International competitions ==
All results regarding high jump

Year	Competition	Venue	Position	Notes
Representing United States
2003	Pan American Junior Championships	Bridgetown, Barbados	3rd	1.81 m
2004	Olympic Games	Athens, Greece	28th (q)	1.85 m
2005	World Championships	Helsinki, Finland	2nd	2.00 m
2006	World Indoor Championships	Moscow, Russia	8th	1.94 m
2008	Olympic Games	Beijing, China	3rd	1.99 m
2009	World Championships	Berlin, Germany	7th	1.96 m
2010	World Indoor Championships	Doha, Qatar	3rd	1.98 m
2012	World Indoor Championships	Istanbul, Turkey	1st	1.98 m
2012	Olympic Games	London, United Kingdom	5th	1.97 m
2014	Continental Cup	Marrakesh, Morocco	2nd	1.97 m
2015	World Championships	Moscow, Russia	—	NM
2016	Olympic Games	Rio de Janeiro, Brazil	4th	1.97 m
(q) Indicates overall position in qualifying round. NM = no mark

== See also ==
- Female two metres club – Track and field event
