= Viktoriya Klyugina =

Russian high jumper

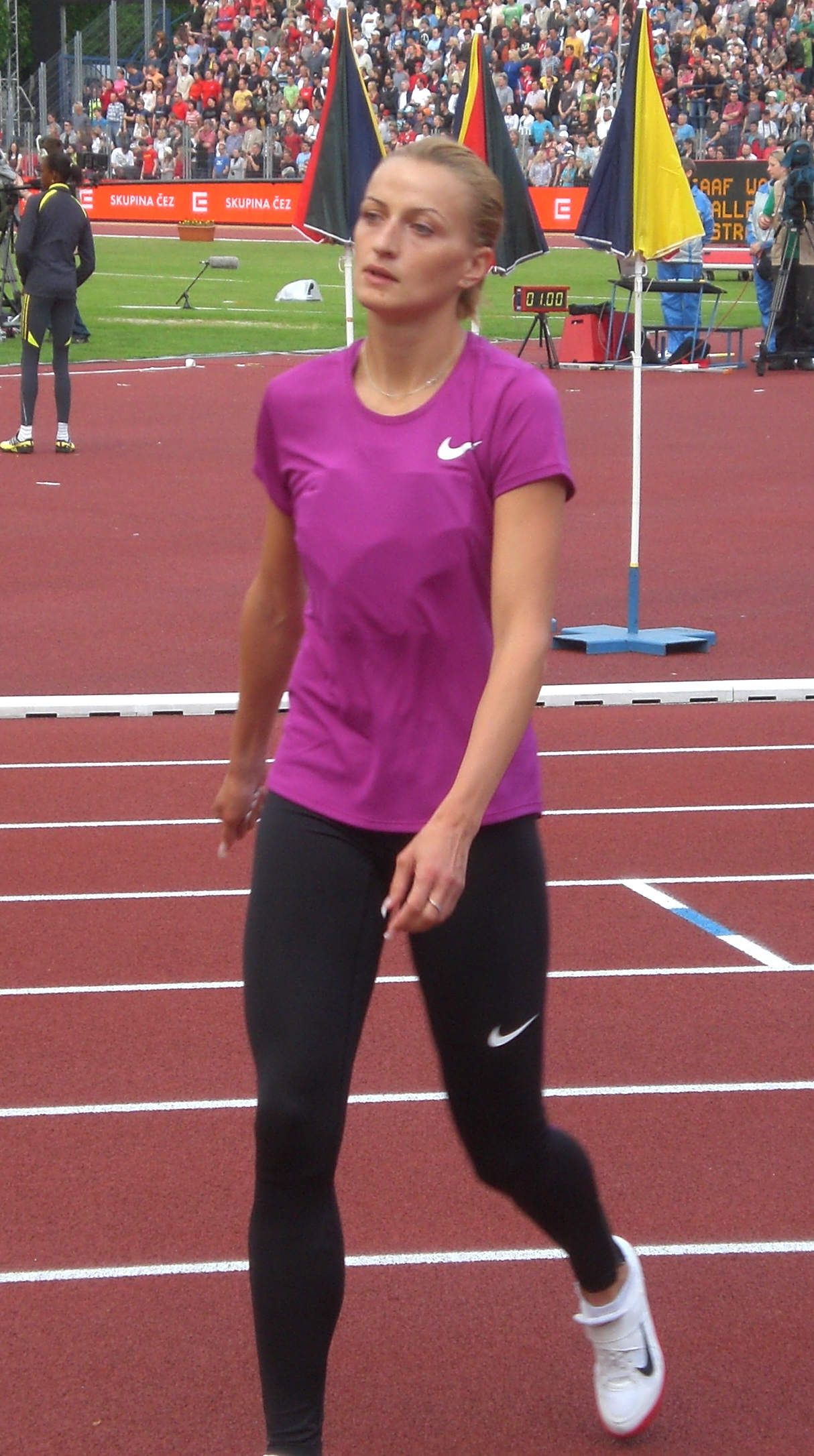
- Viktoriya Klyugina at the 2010 Golden Spike Ostrava

Personal information
- Nationality: Russia
- Born: 28 September 1980 (age 45)

Sport
- Country: Russia
- Event: High jump

Achievements and titles
- Personal best(s): High jump (outdoor): 1.98 m (2008); High jump (indoor): 2.00 m (2009)

Viktoriya Yuryevna Klyugina (Russian: Викто́рия Ю́рьевна Клю́гина; née Slivka; born 28 September 1980) is a Russian high jumper.

== Career ==
She finished fifth at the 1998 World Junior Championships, sixth at the 2000 European Indoor Championships, won the bronze medal at the 2009 European Indoor Championships and finished eighth at the 2009 World Athletics Final.

Her personal best jump is 1.98 metres, achieved in July 2008 in Bühl. She has 2.00 metres on the indoor track, achieved in February 2009 in Arnstadt (Hochsprung mit Musik).

She is married to Sergey Klyugin. They have three children.
