= Deirdre Ryan =

Irish high jumper

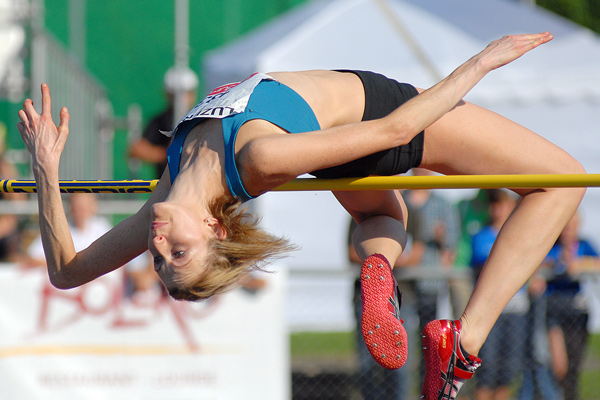
- Ryan at "Spitzen Leichtathletik Luzern", 2012, Lucerne, Switzerland

Personal information
- National team: Ireland
- Born: June 1, 1982 (age 44)

Sport
- Country: Ireland
- Sport: Athletics
- Event: High jump
- Club: Dundrum South Dublin Athletics Club
- Coached by: Gerd Osenberg (in Leverkusen, Germany)
- Retired: Yes (no longer competes)

Achievements and titles
- Personal bests: 1.95 metres (outdoor, 2011, Irish record); 1.93 metres (indoor, 2009)

Deirdre Ryan (born 1 June 1982) is an Irish high jumper. She competed in the 2012 Olympic Games.

== Biography ==
Deirdre Ryan was born 1 June 1982. She tried several sports as a child, including basketball, hockey, swimming, soccer, and gymnastics. At the age of eight, she joined Dundrum South Dublin Athletics Club. She first tried the high jump when she was around 13 years old. She also performed the long jump and ran the hurdles.

Her first international competition was the 1999 World Youth Championships in Poland. Ryan competed in the high jump and finished in ninth place.

Ryan had a stress fracture in 2003.

She finished thirteenth at the 2006 European Championships. She also competed at the 1999 World Youth Championships, the 2002 European Indoor Championships, the 2007 European Indoor Championships, the 2009 European Indoor Championships, the 2009 World Championships and the 2010 World Indoor Championships.

In January 2009, she achieved a personal best jump of 1.93 metres indoors in Leverkusen. She started the 2011 season by tearing ligaments in both of her feet. She started training full-time in Leverkusen, Germany in 2009 under Gerd Osenberg. In August 2011 she jumped 1.95 metres outdoors to place sixth in her heat at the 2011 World Championships in Athletics in Daegu, South Korea, which also qualified her for the final. This height set a new Irish record and was the A-standard qualifying for the 2012 Olympic Games. In the final, Ryan finished in joint-sixth position (fifth after competitor disqualification).

She missed three weeks of training when she sprained her ankle in January 2012. In the London Olympic Games, Ryan successfully cleared 1.80m in her first attempt and 1.85m in two attempts, but failed to clear 1.90m. She clipped the bar with her feet on the first attempt, jumped from a poor location on the second attempt, and parallel planted on the third attempt. She did not advance to the finals.

She no longer competitively high jumps.
