= 2014 European Athletics Championships – Women's high jump =

Women's high jump at the European Athletics Championships

The women's high jump at the 2014 European Athletics Championships took place at the Letzigrund on 15 and 17 August 2014.

== Medalists ==
Gold	Ruth Beitia; Spain
Silver	Mariya Kuchina; Russia
Bronze	Ana Šimić; Croatia

== Records ==
Standing records prior to the 2014 European Athletics Championships
World record	Stefka Kostadinova (BUL)	2.09 m	Rome, Italy	30 August 1987
European record	Stefka Kostadinova (BUL)	2.09 m	Rome, Italy	30 August 1987
Championship record	Tia Hellebaut (BEL)	2.03 m	Gothenburg, Sweden	9 August 2006
Championship record	Venelina Veneva-Mateeva (BUL)	2.03 m	Gothenburg, Sweden	9 August 2006
Championship record	Blanka Vlašić (CRO)	2.03 m	Barcelona, Spain	1 August 2010
World Leading	Anna Chicherova (RUS)	2.01 m	Eugene, United States	31 May 2014
European Leading	Anna Chicherova (RUS)	2.01 m	Eugene, United States	31 May 2014

== World best results in 2014 ==
The world best results in Europe in 2014 before the European Athletics Championships are :

	Athlète	Pays	Result	Lieu	Date
1	Anna Chicherova	Russia	2.01 m	Eugene	31 May 2014
2	Blanka Vlašić	Croatia	2.00 m	Paris; London	5 July 2014; 20 July 2014
2	Mariya Kuchina	Russia	2.00 m	Paris	5 July 2014
4	Justyna Kasprzycka	Poland	1.99 m	Eugene	31 May 2014
4	Ruth Beitia	Spain	1.99 m	Eugene	31 May 2014
6	Ana Šimić	Croatia	1.98 m	Beijing	21 May 2014
6	Oksana Okuneva	Ukraine	1.98 m	Berdychiv	28 June 2014
6	Airinė Palšytė	Lithuania	1.98 m	Kaunas	27 July 2014
9	Kamila Lićwinko	Poland	1.97 m	Płock	4 June 2014
9	Nafissatou Thiam	Belgium	1.97 m	Zürich	14 August 2014

== Schedule ==
Date	Time	Round
15 August 2014	10:35	Qualification
17 August 2014	15:16	Final

All times Central European Summer Time (UTC+2)

== Results ==
=== Qualification ===
Qualification: Qualification Performance 1.94 (Q) or at least 12 best performers advance to the final.

Rank	Group	Name	Nationality	1.70	1.75	1.80	1.85	1.89	Mark	Note
1	A	Ruth Beitia	Spain	–	–	o	o	o	1.89	q
1	B	Marie-Laurence Jungfleisch	Germany	–	o	o	o	o	1.89	q
1	B	Airinė Palšytė	Lithuania	–	o	o	o	o	1.89	q
4	B	Alessia Trost	Italy	–	o	xo	xo	o	1.89	q
5	A	Mariya Kuchina	Russia	–	–	o	o	xo	1.89	q
5	A	Kamila Lićwinko	Poland	–	–	o	o	xo	1.89	q
7	A	Emma Green	Sweden	–	–	o	o	xxo	1.89	q
7	B	Justyna Kasprzycka	Poland	–	o	o	o	xxo	1.89	q
9	A	Ana Šimić	Croatia	–	–	o	xo	xxo	1.89	q
9	B	Tonje Angelsen	Norway	–	xxo	o	xxo	xxo	1.89	q
11	A	Eleriin Haas	Estonia	–	o	o	o	xxx	1.85	q
11	A	Ma'ayan Shahaf	Israel	o	o	o	o	xxx	1.85	q
11	B	Oksana Okuneva	Ukraine	–	o	o	o	xxx	1.85	q
11	B	Daniela Stanciu	Romania	–	o	o	o	xxx	1.85	q
11	B	Grete Udras	Estonia	–	o	o	o	xxx	1.85	q
16	A	Venelina Veneva-Mateeva	Bulgaria	–	o	xo	o	xxx	1.85	
17	A	Morgan Lake	Great Britain	–	o	o	xo	xxx	1.85	
17	A	Barbara Szabó	Hungary	–	o	o	xo	xxx	1.85	
17	B	Mirela Demireva	Bulgaria	–	o	o	xo	xxx	1.85	
20	B	Iryna Herashchenko	Ukraine	–	o	o	xxo	xxx	1.85	
21	A	Iryna Kovalenko	Ukraine	–	o	o	xxx		1.80	
22	A	Burcu Yüksel	Turkey	o	o	xxx			1.75	
	B	Blanka Vlašić	Croatia						DNS	

=== Final ===
Rank	Name	Nationality	1.85	1.90	1.94	1.97	1.99	2.01	2.03	Mark	Note
1st place, gold medalist(s)	Ruth Beitia	Spain	o	xo	o	o	xo	o	xxx	2.01	=WL
2nd place, silver medalist(s)	Mariya Kuchina	Russia	o	o	o	o	o	xxx		1.99	
3rd place, bronze medalist(s)	Ana Šimić	Croatia	o	o	o	xo	o	xxx		1.99	PB
4	Justyna Kasprzycka	Poland	xo	o	o	xo	o	xxx		1.99	=NR
5	Marie-Laurence Jungfleisch	Germany	o	o	xo	o	xxx			1.97	PB
6	Oksana Okuneva	Ukraine	o	o	o	xxx				1.94	
7	Eleriin Haas	Estonia	o	o	xo	xxx				1.94	NUR
8	Daniela Stanciu	Romania	o	o	xxo	xxx				1.94	PB
9	Tonje Angelsen	Norway	o	o	xxx					1.90	
9	Emma Green	Sweden	o	o	xxx					1.90	
9	Kamila Lićwinko	Poland	o	o	xxx					1.90	
9	Alessia Trost	Italy	o	o	xxx					1.90	=SB
13	Airinė Palšytė	Lithuania	xo	o	xx–	x				1.90	
14	Ma'ayan Shahaf	Israel	o	xxx						1.85	
14	Grete Udras	Estonia	o	xxx						1.85	=SB
