= Athletics at the 2016 Summer Olympics – Women's high jump =

Women's high jump at the Games of the XXXI Olympiad
- Venue: Olympic Stadium
- Dates: 18 August 2016 (qualification); 20 August 2016 (final)
- Competitors: 36 from 27 nations
- Winning height: 1.97 m

Medalists
1st place, gold medalist(s)		Ruth Beitia	Spain
2nd place, silver medalist(s)		Mirela Demireva	Bulgaria
3rd place, bronze medalist(s)		Blanka Vlašić	Croatia

The women's high jump event at the 2016 Summer Olympics took place between August 18–20, at the Olympic Stadium.

== Summary ==
There were 17 athletes who made the final. The height of 1.93 proved to be the undoing for five of them, even though all of them had cleared 1.94 in qualifying the day earlier. Among the non-qualifiers were World indoor Champion Vashti Cunningham and European silver medalist Airinė Palšytė. Eight more were excised at 1.97 m, leaving the medalists plus one extra. Waving her fingers at the bar before she jumped, 37 year old Ruth Beitia remained perfect to that point. Mirela Demireva was jumping over her previous best but made it on her first attempt as well. She was in second place with one miss earlier in the competition. Blanka Vlašić had one miss at every height, a pattern that put her in third place. And making the bar on her last attempt, world leader Chaunté Lowe was in fourth place. All but Demireva had cleared 2.00 before, Lowe in 2016. Earlier in her career Vlašić made 2.00 routine and was attempting the world record of 2.10 on occasion. None of them could make 2.00 in the final and their earlier positions were confirmed. It was Beitia's first gold medal in World level competition. This was also the first Olympic women's high jump since 1980 where the winning height was below two metres. A week earlier, while competing in the heptathlon, Katarina Johnson-Thompson had jumped 1.98 m.

== Competition format ==
The competition consisted of two rounds, qualification and final. Athletes started with a qualifying round. Jumping in turn, each athlete attempts to achieve the qualifying height. If they had failed at three jumps in a row, they would have been eliminated. After a successful jump, they received three more attempts to achieve the next height. Once all jumps had been completed, all athletes who had achieved the qualifying height went through to the final. If fewer than 12 athletes had achieved the qualifying standard, the best 12 athletes would have gone through. Cleared heights reset for the final, which followed the same format until all athletes fail three consecutive jumps.

== Records ==
Prior to the competition, the existing World and Olympic records were as follows.

World record	Stefka Kostadinova (BUL)	2.09 m	Rome, Italy	30 August 1987
Olympic record	Yelena Slesarenko (RUS)	2.06 m	Athens, Greece	28 August 2004
2016 World leading	Chaunté Lowe (USA)	2.01	Eugene, Oregon, United States	3 July 2016

== Schedule ==
All times are Brasilia Time (UTC-3)

Date	Time	Round
Thursday, 18 August 2016	10:00	Qualifications
Saturday, 20 August 2016	20:30	Finals

== Results ==
Key

- o = Height cleared
- x = Height failed
- – = Height passed
- r = Retired
- SB = Season's best
- PB = Personal best
- NR = National record
- AR = Area record
- OR = Olympic record
- WR = World record
- WL = World lead
- NM = No mark
- DNS = Did not start
- DQ = Disqualified

=== Qualification ===
Qualification rule: qualification standard 1.94m (Q) or at least best 12 qualified (q).

Rank	Group	Name	Nationality	1.80	1.85	1.89	1.92	1.94	Result	Note
1	B	Ruth Beitia	Spain	–	o	o	o	o	1.94	Q
1	A	Chaunte Lowe	United States	o	o	o	o	o	1.94	Q
1	B	Inika McPherson	United States	–	o	–	o	o	1.94	Q, SB
1	B	Svetlana Radzivil	Uzbekistan	o	o	o	o	o	1.94	Q
1	A	Levern Spencer	Saint Lucia	o	o	o	o	o	1.94	Q
1	B	Blanka Vlašić	Croatia	–	o	o	o	o	1.94	Q
7	B	Sofie Skoog	Sweden	o	o	xo	o	o	1.94	Q, PB
7	B	Alessia Trost	Italy	o	o	xo	o	o	1.94	Q
9	A	Mirela Demireva	Bulgaria	o	o	o	xxo	o	1.94	Q
9	B	Kamila Lićwinko	Poland	–	o	xo	xo	o	1.94	Q
11	B	Airinė Palšytė	Lithuania	o	o	o	xo	xo	1.94	Q
12	B	Marie-Laurence Jungfleisch	Germany	o	o	o	xxo	xo	1.94	Q
13	A	Iryna Gerashchenko	Ukraine	o	o	o	o	xxo	1.94	Q, SB
14	B	Alyxandria Treasure	Canada	o	o	o	xo	xxo	1.94	Q, PB
15	A	Vashti Cunningham	United States	–	o	xo	xo	xxo	1.94	Q
15	A	Morgan Lake	Great Britain	o	o	o	xxo	xxo	1.94	Q, PB
15	A	Desirée Rossit	Italy	o	o	xxo	o	xxo	1.94	Q
18	A	Michaela Hruba	Czech Republic	o	o	o	o	xxx	1.92	
19	A	Yuliya Levchenko	Ukraine	o	o	xo	o	xxx	1.92	
20	A	Nadiya Dusanova	Uzbekistan	o	o	xo	xo	xxx	1.92	
21	B	Maruša Černjul	Slovenia	o	o	o	xxo	xxx	1.92	
22	B	Oksana Okuneva	Ukraine	o	o	o	xxx		1.89	
22	A	Eleanor Patterson	Australia	–	o	o	xxx		1.89	
22	A	Ana Simic	Croatia	–	o	o	xxx		1.89	
25	B	Jeanelle Scheper	Saint Lucia	xo	o	o	xxx		1.89	
26	B	Linda Sandblom	Finland	o	xo	xo	xxx		1.89	
27	A	Doreen Amata	Nigeria	o	xxo	xo	xxx		1.89	
28	A	Priscilla Frederick	Antigua and Barbuda	o	xxo	xxo	xxx		1.89	
29	A	Erika Kinsey	Sweden	o	o	xxx			1.85	
29	B	Lissa Labiche	Seychelles	o	o	xxx			1.85	
31	A	Akela Jones	Barbados	o	xo	xxx			1.85	
32	B	Tonje Angelsen	Norway	xo	xxx				1.80	
32	A	Leontia Kallenou	Cyprus	xo	xxx				1.80	SB
32	A	Valentina Liashenko	Georgia	xo	xxx				1.80	
32	B	Barbara Szabó	Hungary	xo	xxx				1.80	
	B	Nafissatou Thiam	Belgium						DNS	

=== Final ===
Rank	Name	Nationality	1.88	1.93	1.97	2.00	Result	Note
1st place, gold medalist(s)	Ruth Beitia	Spain	o	o	o	xxx	1.97	
2nd place, silver medalist(s)	Mirela Demireva	Bulgaria	xo	o	o	xxx	1.97	PB
3rd place, bronze medalist(s)	Blanka Vlašić	Croatia	xo	xo	xo	xxx	1.97	SB
4	Chaunté Lowe	United States	o	o	xxo	xxx	1.97	
5	Alessia Trost	Italy	o	o	xxx		1.93	
6	Levern Spencer	Saint Lucia	xo	o	xxx		1.93	
7	Sofie Skoog	Sweden	o	xo	xxx		1.93	
7	Marie-Laurence Jungfleisch	Germany	o	xo	xxx		1.93	
9	Kamila Lićwinko	Poland	xo	xo	xxx		1.93	
10	Iryna Gerashchenko	Ukraine	o	xxo	xxx		1.93	
10	Morgan Lake	Great Britain	o	xxo	xxx		1.93	
10	Inika McPherson	United States	o	xxo	xxx		1.93	
13	Airinė Palšytė	Lithuania	o	xxx			1.88	
13	Svetlana Radzivil	Uzbekistan	o	xxx			1.88	
13	Vashti Cunningham	United States	o	xxx			1.88	
16	Desirée Rossit	Italy	xo	xxx			1.88	
17	Alyxandria Treasure	Canada	xxo	xxx			1.88	
