= 2015 European Athletics Indoor Championships – Women's high jump =

The women's high jump event at the 2015 European Athletics Indoor Championships was held on 6 March at 16:05 (qualification) and 7 March at 16:30 (final) local time.

== Medalists ==
Gold	Silver	Bronze
Mariya Kuchina; Russia	Alessia Trost; Italy	Kamila Lićwinko; Poland

== Results ==
=== Qualification ===
Qualification: Qualification Performance 1.94 (Q) or at least 8 best performers (q) advanced to the final.

Rank	Athlete	Nationality	1.72	1.77	1.82	1.87	1.91	1.94	Result	Note
1	Justyna Kasprzycka	Poland	–	–	o	o	o	o	1.94	Q, SB
2	Ruth Beitia	Spain	–	–	o	xo	o	o	1.94	Q
2	Mariya Kuchina	Russia	o	–	xo	o	o	o	1.94	Q
2	Alessia Trost	Italy	–	o	o	o	xo	o	1.94	Q
5	Kamila Lićwinko	Poland	–	–	–	o	o	xo	1.94	Q
5	Airinė Palšytė	Lithuania	–	–	o	o	o	xo	1.94	Q
5	Venelina Veneva-Mateeva	Bulgaria	–	o	o	o	o	xo	1.94	Q, =SB
8	Michaela Hrubá	Czech Republic	–	o	o	o	o	xxx	1.91	q, PB
8	Barbara Szabó	Hungary	–	–	o	o	o	xxx	1.91	q
10	Iryna Herashchenko	Ukraine	–	–	xo	o	xo	xxx	1.91	SB
11	Urszula Gardzielewska	Poland	–	–	o	o	xxx		1.87	
11	Katarina Mögenburg	Norway	o	o	o	o	xxx		1.87	
13	Mirela Demireva	Bulgaria	o	o	xo	o	xxx		1.87	
14	Oldriška Marešová	Czech Republic	o	o	o	xo	xxx		1.87	
15	Ma'ayan Shahaf	Israel	–	o	o	xxo	xxx		1.87	SB
16	Sofie Skoog	Sweden	o	o	xxo	xxo	xxx		1.87	=SB
17	Isobel Pooley	Great Britain	–	o	o	xxx			1.82	
18	Grete Udras	Estonia	–	xo	xo	xxx			1.82	
19	Daniela Stanciu	Romania	–	o	xxo	xxx			1.82	
20	Marija Vuković	Montenegro	o	o	xxx				1.77	
21	Madara Onužāne	Latvia	o	xo	xxx				1.77	
22	Valentyna Liashenko	Georgia	xo	xxx					1.72	

=== Final ===
Rank	Athlete	Nationality	1.80	1.85	1.90	1.94	1.97	1.99	1.99	1.97	Result	Note
1st place, gold medalist(s)	Mariya Kuchina	Russia	–	o	o	o	xxo	xxx	x	o	1.97	
2nd place, silver medalist(s)	Alessia Trost	Italy	o	o	o	o	xxo	xxx	x	x	1.97	SB
3rd place, bronze medalist(s)	Kamila Lićwinko	Poland	–	o	o	o	xxx				1.94	
4	Airinė Palšytė	Lithuania	o	o	o	xo	xxx				1.94	
5	Ruth Beitia	Spain	–	xo	xo	xo	xxx				1.94	
6	Justyna Kasprzycka	Poland	o	o	o	xxo	xxx				1.94	=SB
7	Venelina Veneva-Mateeva	Bulgaria	o	o	xxo	xxx					1.90	
8	Michaela Hrubá	Czech Republic	o	o	xxx						1.85	
8	Barbara Szabó	Hungary	o	o	xxx						1.85	
