= Sofie Skoog =

Swedish high jumper

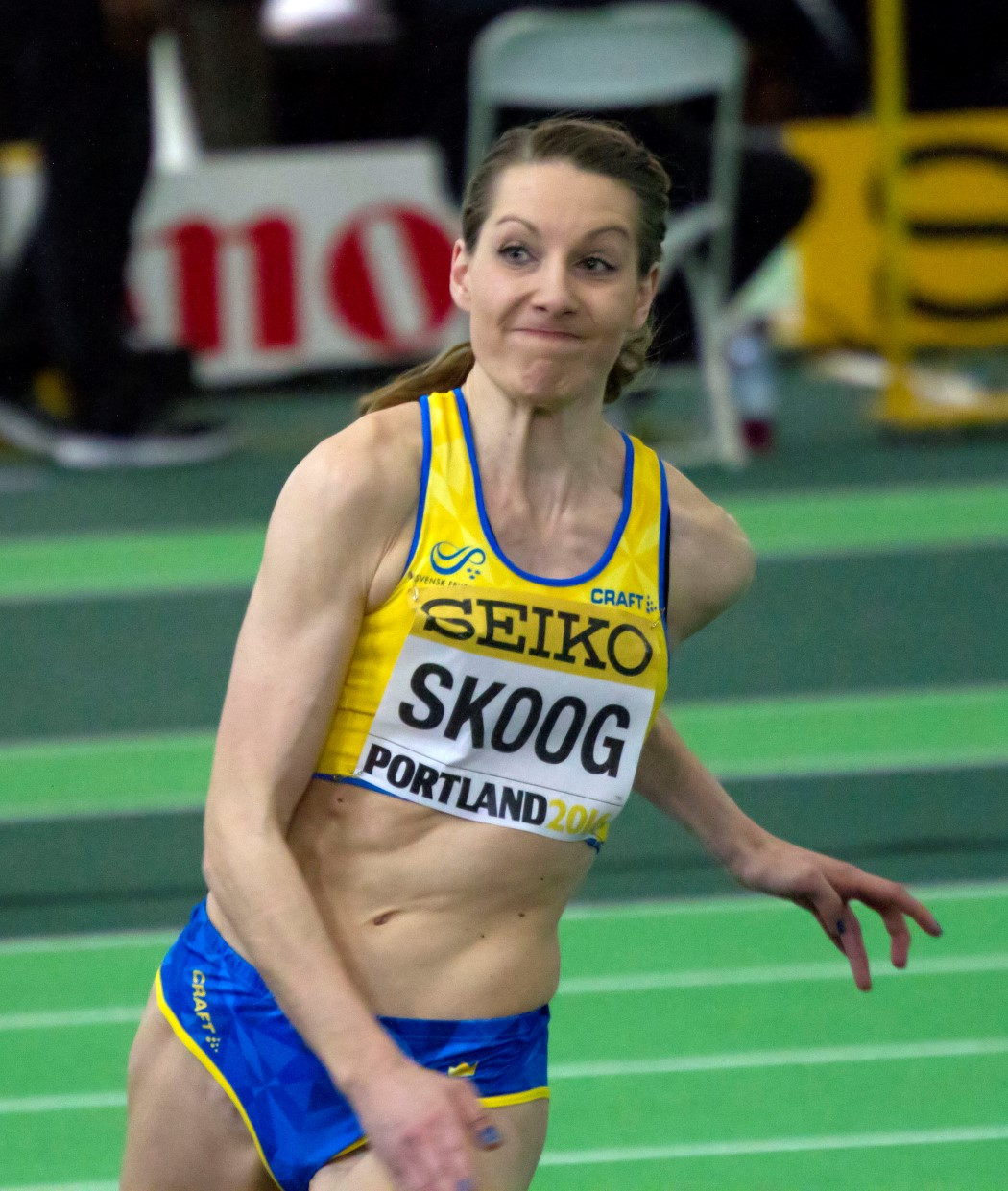

Personal information
- Full name: Sofie Natalie Skoog
- Born: 7 June 1990 (age 36) Ekshärad, Hagfors, Sweden
- Height: 1.80 m (5 ft 11 in)
- Weight: 64 kg (141 lb)

Sport
- Country: Sweden
- Sport: Athletics
- Event: High jump
- Club: IF Göta Karlstad
- Coached by: Stefan Holm

Achievements and titles
- Personal best: High jump: 1.94 (2016)
- Updated on 29 August 2015

Sofie Natalie Skoog (born 7 June 1990) is a Swedish high jumper. She represented her nation Sweden at the 2015 IAAF World Championships, and at the 2016 Summer Olympics, finishing seventh in the final round of the women's high jump. Skoog currently trains as a member of the track and field squad for IF Göta Karlstad, under the tutelage of her coach Stefan Holm, a former high jumper and Athens 2004 champion.

Skoog competed for Sweden, along with her fellow countrywoman Erika Kinsey, in the women's high jump at the 2016 Summer Olympics in Rio de Janeiro. Six months before her maiden Games, she jumped a height of 1.94 m to attain the IAAF Olympic entry standard by just a single centimetre at the Nordic Championships in Växjö. Having entered the final round with a personal best of 1.94 m set at the qualifying phase, Skoog managed to jump easily into the competition at 1.88, and then spent two attempts to get over 1.93 m. Unable to trump the 1.97-metre mark after three attempts, Skoog ended her Olympic campaign in a two-way tie with Germany's Marie-Laurence Jungfleisch for seventh place.

== Competition record ==
Year	Competition	Venue	Position	Notes
Representing Sweden
2013	Universiade	Kazan, Russia	9th	1.84 m
2015	European Indoor Championships	Prague, Czech Republic	16th (q)	1.87 m
2015	World Championships	Beijing, China	14th (q)	1.89 m
2016	World Indoor Championships	Portland, United States	5th	1.93 m
2016	European Championships	Amsterdam, Netherlands	9th	1.89 m
2016	Olympic Games	Rio de Janeiro, Brazil	7th	1.93 m
2017	European Indoor Championships	Belgrade, Serbia	9th (q)	1.86 m
2017	World Championships	London, United Kingdom	18th (q)	1.89 m
2018	World Indoor Championships	Birmingham, United Kingdom	10th	1.84 m
2018	European Championships	Berlin, Germany	16th (q)	1.86 m
2019	European Indoor Championships	Glasgow, United Kingdom	14th (q)	1.89 m
