= Kamila Lićwinko =

Polish high jumper

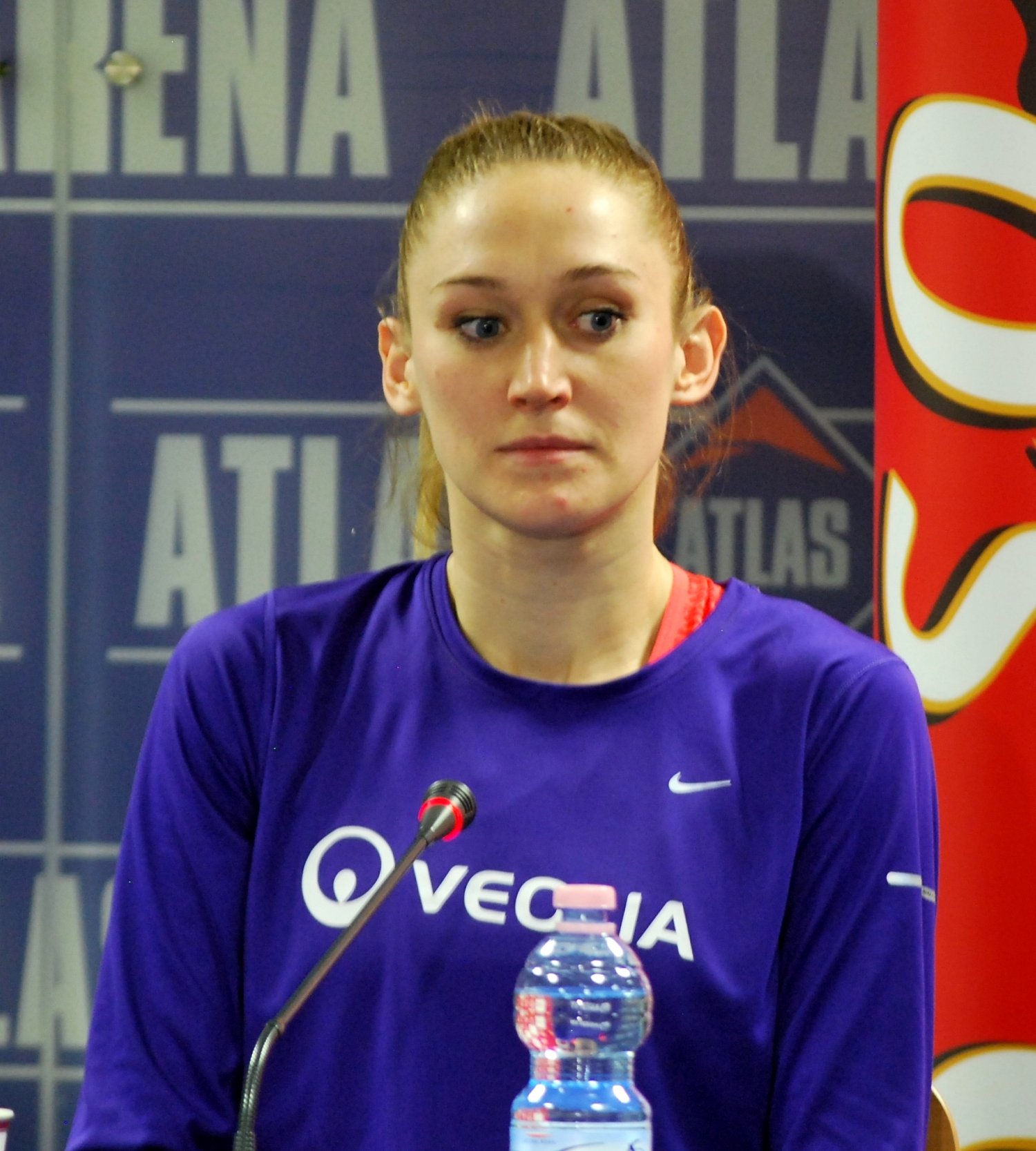
- Lićwinko in 2016

Personal information
- Born: Kamila Stepaniuk; 22 March 1986 (age 40) Bielsk Podlaski, Poland
- Height: 1.83 m (6 ft 0 in)
- Weight: 66 kg (146 lb)

Sport
- Sport: Athletics
- Event: High jump
- College team: College of Physical Education and Tourism in Białystok
- Club: Podlasie Białystok
- Coached by: Janusz Kuczyński (–2011); Michał Lićwinko (2011–)
Medal record
Women's athletics
Representing Poland
World Championships
| Bronze medal – third place | 2017 London | High jump |
World Indoor Championships
| Gold medal – first place | 2014 Sopot | High jump |
| Bronze medal – third place | 2016 Portland | High jump |
European Indoor Championships
| Bronze medal – third place | 2015 Prague | High jump |
European Team Championships
| Gold medal – first place | 2021 Chorzów | high jump |
| Silver medal – second place | 2013 Gateshead | high jump |
| Bronze medal – third place | 2014 Braunschweig | high jump |
| Bronze medal – third place | 2015 Cheboksary | high jump |
Summer Universiade
| Gold medal – first place | 2013 Kazan | High jump |

Kamila Lićwinko (née Stepaniuk; born 22 March 1986) is a Polish retired track and field athlete who specialized in the high jump.

== International ==
Her personal bests in the event are 1.99 metres outdoors (2013, 2015, 2016) and 2.02 metres indoors (2015). Both are current Polish national records. She won the gold medal at the 2014 World Indoor Championship ex aequo with Mariya Kuchina.

In 2015, the Pole finished 4th at the World Championships with a 1.99 m's jump, equalling her own-shared national record. Mariya Kuchina of Russia took the gold (2.01 m), Croatia's Blanka Vlašić the silver (2.01 m) and Kuchina's compatriot Anna Chicherova the bronze (2.01 m).

In March 2016, she could not retain her world indoor title, taking the bronze medal on countback in Portland behind Vashti Cunningham (gold) and Ruth Beitia (silver). On 18 June, Kamila Lićwinko jumped a new World Lead of 1.99 m (=NR) in Szczecin, before failing three time at 2.01 m.

As the captain of the Polish team, she received the gold medal at 2021 European Athletics Team Championships.

== Competition record ==
| Year | Competition | Venue | Position | Notes |
Representing Poland
| 2005 | European Junior Championships | Kaunas, Lithuania | 8th | 1.82 m |
| 2007 | European U23 Championships | Debrecen, Hungary | 4th | 1.86 m |
| 2009 | European Indoor Championships | Turin, Italy | 8th | 1.92 m |
| 2009 | Universiade | Belgrade, Serbia | 4th | 1.88 m |
| 2009 | World Championships | Berlin, Germany | 16th (q) | 1.92 m |
| 2013 | European Indoor Championships | Gothenburg, Sweden | 17th (q) | 1.85 m |
| 2013 | Universiade | Kazan, Russia | 1st | 1.96 m |
| 2013 | World Championships | Moscow, Russia | 7th | 1.93 m |
| 2014 | World Indoor Championships | Sopot, Poland | 1st | 2.00 m |
| 2014 | European Championships | Zürich, Switzerland | 9th | 1.90 m |
| 2015 | European Indoor Championships | Prague, Czech Republic | 3rd | 1.94 m |
| 2015 | World Championships | Beijing, China | 4th | 1.99 m |
| 2016 | World Indoor Championships | Portland, United States | 3rd | 1.96 m |
| 2016 | Olympic Games | Rio de Janeiro, Brazil | 9th | 1.93 m |
| 2017 | European Indoor Championships | Belgrade, Serbia | 9th (q) | 1.86 m |
| 2017 | World Championships | London, United Kingdom | 3rd | 1.99 m |
| 2019 | World Championships | Doha, Qatar | 5th | 1.98 m |
| 2021 | European Team Championships | Chorzów, Poland | 1st | 1.94 m |
| 2021 | Olympic Games | Tokyo, Japan | 11th | 1.93 m |

== Personal life ==
In 2013 she married Michał Lićwinko, who is also her coach. On 12 February 2015, she was awarded the Golden Cross of Merit by President Bronisław Komorowski. In February 2018 she announced her career suspension because of pregnancy.

== State awards ==
- 2015 Gold Cross of Merit
