= 2017 World Championships in Athletics – Women's high jump =

Women's high jump at the 2017 World Championships
- Venue: Olympic Stadium
- Dates: 10 August (qualification); 12 August (final)
- Competitors: 30 from 22 nations
- Winning height: 2.03

Medalists
gold medal	Mariya Lasitskene	Authorised Neutral Athletes
silver medal	Yuliya Levchenko	Ukraine
bronze medal	Kamila Lićwinko	Poland

Video on YouTube Official Video

The women's high jump competition at the 2017 World Championships in Athletics was held at the London Olympic Stadium on 10–12 August.

== Summary ==
In the final, three were perfect to 1.95 metres, 2017 number one Mariya Lasitskene, competing as an Authorised Neutral Athlete, Yuliya Levchenko (UKR) and Marie-Laurence Jungfleisch (GER). Three others made it over 1.95 metres to stay in the competition. At 1.97 metres, both Lasitskene and Levchenko remained perfect. On her final attempt Kamila Lićwinko (POL) made it to define the medalists. Lićwinko mixed up the order by jumping 1.99 metres on her first attempt. Levchenko remained perfect to hold the lead, but when Lasitskene missed her first attempt, she dropped to third. Strategically passing to 2.01 metres, Lasitskene cleared it on her first attempt after Lićwinko had missed, to move into silver medal position. That turned into gold after Levchenko missed her first attempt. Lićwinko missed her second attempt and dropped to bronze when Levchenko made hers. Lićwinko passed for one heroic jump at 2.03 metres for the win. She missed, Lasitskene made it, then Levchenko missed three in a row to end the competition. Lasitskene took three shots at 2.08 metres.

Lasitskene was the first Authorised Neutral Athlete to win a gold medal. For the medal ceremony, the IAAF anthem was played as a substitute.

== Records ==
Before the competition records were as follows:

Record	Perf.	Athlete	Nat.	Date	Location
World	2.09	Stefka Kostadinova	BUL	30 Aug 1987	Rome, Italy
Championship	2.09	Stefka Kostadinova	BUL	30 Aug 1987	Rome, Italy
World leading	2.06	Maria Lasitskene	RUS	6 Jul 2017	Lausanne, Switzerland
African	2.06	Hestrie Cloete	RSA	31 Aug 2003	Paris, France
Asian	1.99	Marina Aitova	KAZ	13 Jul 2009	Athens, Greece
NACAC	2.05	Chaunté Howard Lowe	USA	26 Jun 2010	Des Moines, United States
South American	1.96	Solange Witteveen	ARG	8 Sep 1997	Oristano, Italy
European	2.09	Stefka Kostadinova	BUL	30 Aug 1987	Rome, Italy
Oceanian	1.98	Vanessa Browne-Ward	AUS	12 Feb 1989	Perth, Australia
Oceanian	1.98	Alison Inverarity	AUS	17 Jul 1994	Ingolstadt, Germany

No records were set at the competition.

== Qualification standard ==
The standard to qualify automatically for entry was 1.94 metres.

== Schedule ==
The event schedule, in local time (UTC+1), is as follows:

Date	Time	Round
10 August	19:10	Qualification
12 August	19:05	Final

== Results ==
=== Qualification ===
The qualification round took place on 10 August, in two groups, both starting at 19:10. Athletes attaining a mark of 1.94 metres ( Q ) or at least the 12 best performers ( q ) qualified for the final. The overall results were as follows:

Rank	Group	Name	Nationality	1.80	1.85	1.89	1.92	Mark	Notes
1	B	Mariya Lasitskene	Authorised Neutral Athletes	–	o	o	o	1.92	q
1	B	Yuliya Levchenko	Ukraine	o	o	o	o	1.92	q
1	B	Kamila Lićwinko	Poland	–	o	o	o	1.92	q
4	A	Katarina Johnson-Thompson	Great Britain & N.I.	o	o	xo	o	1.92	q
4	A	Inika McPherson	United States	–	o	xo	o	1.92	q
6	A	Vashti Cunningham	United States	o	o	o	xo	1.92	q
6	B	Mirela Demireva	Bulgaria	o	o	o	xo	1.92	q, SB
6	B	Morgan Lake	Great Britain & N.I.	o	o	o	xo	1.92	q
6	A	Airinė Palšytė	Lithuania	o	o	o	xo	1.92	q
10	B	Michaela Hrubá	Czech Republic	o	o	xo	xo	1.92	q
11	B	Ruth Beitia	Spain	o	o	o	xxo	1.92	q
11	A	Marie-Laurence Jungfleisch	Germany	o	o	o	xxo	1.92	q
13	B	Maruša Černjul	Slovenia	o	o	o	xxx	1.89	
13	B	Iryna Herashchenko	Ukraine	o	o	o	xxx	1.89	
13	A	Levern Spencer	Saint Lucia	o	o	o	xxx	1.89	
16	A	Irina Gordeeva	Authorised Neutral Athletes	o	xo	o	xxx	1.89	
17	A	Kimberly Williamson	Jamaica	o	xxo	o	xxx	1.89	
18	B	Sofie Skoog	Sweden	o	o	xo	xxx	1.89	
19	B	Alessia Trost	Italy	o	o	xxo	xxx	1.89	
20	A	Oksana Okuneva	Ukraine	o	xxo	xxo	xxx	1.89	
21	B	Nadiya Dusanova	Uzbekistan	o	o	xxx		1.85	
21	A	Erika Kinsey	Sweden	o	o	xxx		1.85	
21	B	Alyxandria Treasure	Canada	o	o	xxx		1.85	
21	A	Marija Vuković	Montenegro	o	o	xxx		1.85	
25	A	Ana Šimić	Croatia	o	xo	xxx		1.85	
26	A	Tatiana Gousin	Greece	xo	xxo	xxx		1.85	
27	B	Elizabeth Patterson	United States	o	xxx			1.80	
28	A	Erika Furlani	Italy	xo	xxx			1.80	
29	B	Linda Sandblom	Finland	xxo	xxx			1.80	
	A	Nicola McDermott	Australia	xxx				NH	

=== Final ===
The final took place on 12 August at 19:05. The results were as follows:

Rank	Name	Nationality	1.84	1.88	1.92	1.95	1.97	1.99	2.01	2.03	2.08	Mark	Notes
1st place, gold medalist(s)	Mariya Lasitskene	Authorised Neutral Athletes	o	o	o	o	o	x-	o	o	xxx	2.03	
2nd place, silver medalist(s)	Yuliya Levchenko	Ukraine	o	o	o	o	o	o	xo	xxx		2.01	PB
3rd place, bronze medalist(s)	Kamila Lićwinko	Poland	o	o	xo	xo	xxo	o	xx-	x		1.99	SB
4	Marie-Laurence Jungfleisch	Germany	o	o	o	o	xxx					1.95	
5	Katarina Johnson-Thompson	Great Britain & N.I.	o	o	xo	o	xxx					1.95	SB
6	Morgan Lake	Great Britain & N.I.	o	o	o	xo	xxx					1.95	
7	Airinė Palšytė	Lithuania	o	o	o	xxx						1.92	
7	Mirela Demireva	Bulgaria	o	o	o	xxx						1.92	SB
9	Inika McPherson	United States	-	xo	o	xxx						1.92	
10	Vashti Cunningham	United States	o	o	xxo	xxx						1.92	
11	Michaela Hrubá	Czech Republic	o	xo	xxo	xxx						1.92	
12	Ruth Beitia	Spain	o	o	xxx							1.88	
