= Lyashenko =

Lyashenko or Liashenko (Ukrainian: Ляшенко) is a Ukrainian surname. Notable people with the surname include:

- Andriy Lyashenko (born 1998), Ukrainian footballer
- Elena Liashenko (born 1976), Ukrainian figure skater
- Liudmyla Liashenko (born 1993), Ukrainian skier and biathlete
- Roman Lyashenko (1979–2003), Russian ice hockey player
- Valentina Liashenko (born 1981), Georgian high jumper
