= 2009 European Athletics U23 Championships – Women's high jump =

The women's high jump event at the 2009 European Athletics U23 Championships was held in Kaunas, Lithuania, at S. Dariaus ir S. Girėno stadionas (Darius and Girėnas Stadium) on 16 and 18 July.

== Medalists ==
Gold	Aleksandra Shamsutdinova; Russia
Silver	Melanie Bauschke; Germany
Bronze	Urszula Domel; Poland

== Results ==
=== Final ===
18 July

Rank	Name	Nationality	Attempts							Result	Notes
Rank	Name	Nationality	1.70	1.75	1.79	1.83	1.86	1.89	1.91	Result	Notes
1st place, gold medalist(s)	Aleksandra Shamsutdinova	Russia	–	o	o	o	o	o	xxx	1.89	
2nd place, silver medalist(s)	Melanie Bauschke	Germany	–	o	xo	o	o	xo	x	1.89	
3rd place, bronze medalist(s)	Urszula Domel	Poland	o	o	o	o	xo	xxx		1.86	
4	Jennifer Klein	Germany	–	o	xo	o	xo	xxx		1.86	
5	Julia Wanner	Germany	–	o	o	o	xxo	xxx		1.86	
5	Ebba Jungmark	Sweden	–	o	o	o	xxo	xxx		1.86	
7	Mirela Demireva	Bulgaria	–	o	o	o	xxx			1.83	
8	Erika Wiklund	Sweden	–	o	xxo	o	xxx			1.83	
9	Justyna Kasprzycka	Poland	o	xo	o	xxx				1.79	
10	Hannelore Desmet	Belgium	–	xxo	o	xxx				1.79	
11	Øyunn Grindem Mogstad	Norway	–	x	xo	xxx				1.79	
12	Jessica Leach	United Kingdom	o	o	xxx					1.75	

=== Qualifications ===
16 July
Qualifying 1.85 or 12 best to the Final

==== Group A ====
Rank	Name	Nationality	Result	Notes
1	Hannelore Desmet	Belgium	1.83	q
1	Øyunn Grindem	Norway	1.83	q
3	Aleksandra Shamsutdinova	Russia	1.83	q
4	Jennifer Klein	Germany	1.83	q
4	Melanie Bauschke	Germany	1.83	q
6	Daniela Stanciu	Romania	1.77	
6	Ezgi Sevilmiş	Turkey	1.77	
8	Linda Sandblom	Finland	1.72	
8	Liene Karsuma	Latvia	1.72	
8	Anna Alexson	Sweden	1.72	
11	Adele Lassu	United Kingdom	1.72	
11	Marisa Anselmo	Portugal	1.72	

==== Group B ====
Rank	Name	Nationality	Result	Notes
1	Julia Wanner	Germany	1.83	q
2	Jessica Leach	United Kingdom	1.83	q
2	Urszula Domel	Poland	1.83	q
4	Justyna Kasprzycka	Poland	1.83	q
4	Erika Wiklund	Sweden	1.83	q
6	Mirela Demireva	Bulgaria	1.83	q
7	Ebba Jungmark	Sweden	1.80	q
8	Grete Udras	Estonia	1.80	
9	Lara Kronauer	Switzerland	1.80	
10	Danielle Frenkel	Israel	1.72	
10	Sibel Yasa	Turkey	1.72	
12	Georgiana Zărcan	Romania	1.72	
13	Ruth Ndoumbe	Spain	1.72	

== Participation ==
According to an unofficial count, 25 athletes from 17 countries participated in the event.

- Belgium (1)
- Bulgaria (1)
- Estonia (1)
- Finland (1)
- Germany (3)
- Israel (1)
- Latvia (1)
- Norway (1)
- Poland (2)
- Portugal (1)
- Romania (2)
- Russia (1)
- Spain (1)
- Sweden (3)
- Switzerland (1)
- Turkey (2)
- United Kingdom (2)
