= Athletics at the 2013 Summer Universiade – Women's high jump =

The women's high jump event at the 2013 Summer Universiade was held on 10–12 July.

== Medalists ==
Gold	Silver	Bronze
Kamila Stepaniuk; Poland	Mariya Kuchina; Russia	Anna Iljuštšenko; Estonia

== Results ==
=== Qualification ===
Qualification: 1.91 m (Q) or at least 12 best (q) qualified for the final.

Rank	Group	Athlete	Nationality	1.65	1.70	1.75	1.80	1.84	Result	Notes
1	A	Mariya Kuchina	Russia	–	–	o	o	o	1.84	q
1	A	Burcu Yüksel	Turkey	–	–	o	o	o	1.84	q
1	B	Maayan Furman	Israel	–	o	o	o	o	1.84	q
1	B	Anna Iljuštšenko	Estonia	–	–	–	o	o	1.84	q
1	B	Justyna Kasprzycka	Poland	–	–	o	o	o	1.84	q
1	B	Yevgeniya Kononova	Russia	–	o	o	o	o	1.84	q
1	B	Elizabeth Lamb	New Zealand	–	o	o	o	o	1.84	q, =SB
8	A	Kamila Stepaniuk	Poland	–	–	o	o	xo	1.84	q
9	A	Barbara Szabó	Hungary	–	–	o	xo	xxo	1.84	q
9	B	Antonia Stergiou	Greece	–	–	o	xo	xxo	1.84	q
11	A	Sofie Skoog	Sweden	–	o	o	o	xxx	1.80	q
12	B	Giovanna Demo	Switzerland	–	o	xo	o	xxx	1.80	q
13	A	Emma Kimoto	Canada	–	o	o	xo	xxx	1.80	
13	B	Elina Smolander	Finland	–	o	o	xo	xxx	1.80	
15	B	Michelle Theophille	Canada	–	xo	o	xo	xxx	1.80	
16	A	Madara Onužāne	Latvia	–	o	xo	xxx		1.75	SB
17	A	Fabiola Ayala	Mexico	–	o	xxo	xxx		1.75	
18	B	Basant Ibrahim	Egypt	–	xo	xxo	xxx		1.75	SB
19	B	Fung Wai Yee	Hong Kong	xo	o	xxx			1.70	
20	A	Shahaf Bareni	Israel	–	xo	xxx			1.70	
21	A	Linn Vikan	Norway	xo	xxx				1.65	
22	A	Emma Sutherland	New Zealand	xxo	xxx				1.65	
	A	Cindy Vega	Colombia	xxx					NM	
	A	Kashani Ríos	Panama						DNS	
	B	Doussou Diakite	Mali						DNS	

=== Final ===
Rank	Athlete	Nationality	1.75	1.80	1.84	1.87	1.90	1.92	1.94	1.96	1.98	2.00	Result	Notes
1st place, gold medalist(s)	Kamila Stepaniuk	Poland	o	o	o	xo	xo	o	xo	xo	xx–	x	1.96	
2nd place, silver medalist(s)	Mariya Kuchina	Russia	o	o	o	o	o	o	xo	xxo	xxx		1.96	PB
3rd place, bronze medalist(s)	Anna Iljuštšenko	Estonia	–	xo	o	o	xxo	o	o	xxx			1.94	
4	Yevgeniya Kononova	Russia	o	o	o	o	xxo	xxo	xxx				1.92	=PB
5	Antonia Stergiou	Greece	o	o	o	o	xxx						1.87	
6	Burcu Yüksel	Turkey	o	xo	xo	xo	xxx						1.87	
7	Maayan Furman	Israel	o	o	o	xxo	xxx						1.87	
8	Justyna Kasprzycka	Poland	o	o	o	xxx							1.84	
9	Sofie Skoog	Sweden	xo	o	o	xxx							1.84	
10	Elizabeth Lamb	New Zealand	o	o	xxx								1.80	
10	Barbara Szabó	Hungary	–	o	xxx								1.80	
12	Giovanna Demo	Switzerland	o	xo	xxx								1.80	
