= 2015 World Championships in Athletics – Women's high jump =

Women's high jump at the 2015 World Championships
- Venue: Beijing National Stadium
- Dates: 27 August (qualification); 29 August (final)
- Competitors: 30 from 22 nations
- Winning height: 2.01

Medalists
gold medal	Mariya Kuchina	Russia
silver medal	Blanka Vlašić	Croatia
bronze medal	Anna Chicherova	Russia

The women's high jump at the 2015 World Championships in Athletics was held at the Beijing National Stadium on 27 and 29 August.

It took 1.92 to make the finals, and eight competitors made it cleanly. In the finals, only eight cleared 1.92; Ana Šimić, Doreen Amata, and Levern Spencer, who had jumped it in qualification, missed three times. 1.95 lost Jeanelle Scheper and Eleanor Patterson, but the remaining six all made it through three heights to 1.99. Two-time champion Blanka Vlašić looked like her dominant self from six years earlier with a large clearance at 2.01, but she had one failure at 1.92. Mariya Kuchina, whose best achievement had been a tie for the World Indoor Championship, cleared it next as a personal best, and she was still clean. The 2012 Olympic champion Anna Chicherova cleared it on her second attempt. Kamila Lićwinko (the other half of that tie), returning bronze medalist Ruth Beitia, and Marie-Laurence Jungfleisch were unable to make 2.01, so the medals were settled. The bar went up to 2.03, but nobody could make it, so the results were decided by the count back. Chicherova needed two attempts at the winning height, so she finished third. Of the two who made it their first time, that mistake earlier in the competition gave Vlašić another silver medal (her fourth in major competition), while Kuchina's perfect series was rewarded with the gold medal.

== Records ==
Prior to the competition, the records were as follows:

World record	Stefka Kostadinova (BUL)	2.09	Rome, Italy	30 August 1987
Championship record	Stefka Kostadinova (BUL)	2.09	Rome, Italy	30 August 1987
World leading	Anna Chicherova (RUS)	2.03	Lausanne, Switzerland	9 July 2015
African record	Hestrie Cloete (RSA)	2.06	Paris, France	31 August 2003
Asian record	Marina Aitova (KAZ)	1.99	Athens, Greece	13 July 2009
North, Central American and Caribbean record	Chaunté Howard Lowe (USA)	2.05	Des Moines, United States	26 June 2010
South American record	Solange Witteveen (ARG)	1.96	Oristano, Italy	8 September 1997
European record	Stefka Kostadinova (BUL)	2.09	Rome, Italy	30 August 1987
Oceanian record	Vanessa Browne-Ward (AUS)	1.98	Perth, Australia	12 February 1989
Oceanian record	Alison Inverarity (AUS)	1.98	Ingolstadt, Germany	17 July 1994

== Qualification standards ==
Entry standards
1.94

== Schedule ==
Date	Time	Round
27 August 2015	09:35	Qualification
29 August 2015	18:30	Final

== Results ==
KEY:	Q	Qualified	q	12 best performers	NR	National record	PB	Personal best	SB	Seasonal best

=== Qualification ===
Qualification: 1.94 m (Q) or at least 12 best performers (q).

Rank	Group	Name	Nationality	1.80	1.85	1.89	1.92	Mark	Notes
1	B	Ana Šimić	Croatia	o	o	o	o	1.92	q
1	A	Anna Chicherova	Russia	–	o	o	o	1.92	q
1	A	Blanka Vlašić	Croatia	–	o	o	o	1.92	q
1	A	Doreen Amata	Nigeria	o	o	o	o	1.92	q
1	A	Levern Spencer	Saint Lucia	o	o	o	o	1.92	q
1	B	Mariya Kuchina	Russia	o	o	o	o	1.92	q
1	A	Marie-Laurence Jungfleisch	Germany	o	o	o	o	1.92	q
1	B	Ruth Beitia	Spain	–	o	o	o	1.92	q
9	B	Eleanor Patterson	Australia	–	o	xo	o	1.92	q
9	B	Kamila Lićwinko	Poland	–	o	xo	o	1.92	q
11	B	Jeanelle Scheper	Saint Lucia	o	o	xxo	o	1.92	q
12	B	Mirela Demireva	Bulgaria	o	xo	o	xo	1.92	q
13	B	Svetlana Radzivil	Uzbekistan	o	o	xo	xxo	1.92	q
14	A	Airinė Palšytė	Lithuania	o	o	o	xxx	1.89	
14	A	Morgan Lake	Great Britain & N.I.	o	o	o	xxx	1.89	
14	B	Oksana Okuneva	Ukraine	o	o	o	xxx	1.89	
14	B	Sofie Skoog	Sweden	o	o	o	xxx	1.89	
18	A	Erika Kinsey	Sweden	o	xo	o	xxx	1.89	
19	B	Isobel Pooley	Great Britain & N.I.	o	o	xo	xxx	1.89	
19	B	Oldřiška Marešová	Czech Republic	o	o	xo	xxx	1.89	
21	A	Lissa Labiche	Seychelles	o	xo	xxo	xxx	1.89	
22	B	Priscilla Frederick	Antigua and Barbuda	o	o	xxx		1.85	
23	A	Iryna Herashchenko	Ukraine	xo	o	xxx		1.85	
24	B	Yuliya Levchenko	Ukraine	o	xo	xxx		1.85	
25	A	Eleriin Haas	Estonia	o	xxo	xxx		1.85	
26	A	Zheng Xingjuan	China	o	xxx			1.80	
26	B	Barbara Szabó	Hungary	o	xxx			1.80	
28	A	Venelina Veneva-Mateeva	Bulgaria	xo	xxx			1.80	
	A	Chaunté Lowe	United States	xxx				NM	
	A	Valentina Liashenko	Georgia	xxx				NM	

=== Final ===
The final started at 18:30.

Rank	Name	Nationality	1.88	1.92	1.95	1.97	1.99	2.01	2.03	Mark	Notes
1st place, gold medalist(s)	Mariya Kuchina	Russia	o	o	o	o	o	o	xxx	2.01	PB
2nd place, silver medalist(s)	Blanka Vlašić	Croatia	o	xo	o	o	o	o	xxx	2.01	SB
3rd place, bronze medalist(s)	Anna Chicherova	Russia	o	–	o	xo	o	xo	xxx	2.01	
4	Kamila Lićwinko	Poland	o	o	o	o	o	xxx		1.99	=NR
5	Ruth Beitia	Spain	o	o	xo	o	o	xxx		1.99	
6	Marie-Laurence Jungfleisch	Germany	o	o	o	x–	xo	xxx		1.99	PB
7	Jeanelle Scheper	Saint Lucia	o	o	xxx					1.92	
8	Eleanor Patterson	Australia	xo	o	xxx					1.92	
9	Ana Šimić	Croatia	o	xxx						1.88	
9	Mirela Demireva	Bulgaria	o	xxx						1.88	
9	Svetlana Radzivil	Uzbekistan	o	xxx						1.88	
12	Levern Spencer	Saint Lucia	xo	xxx						1.88	
12	Doreen Amata	Nigeria	xo	xxx						1.88	
