= Barbara Szabó =

Hungarian high jumper

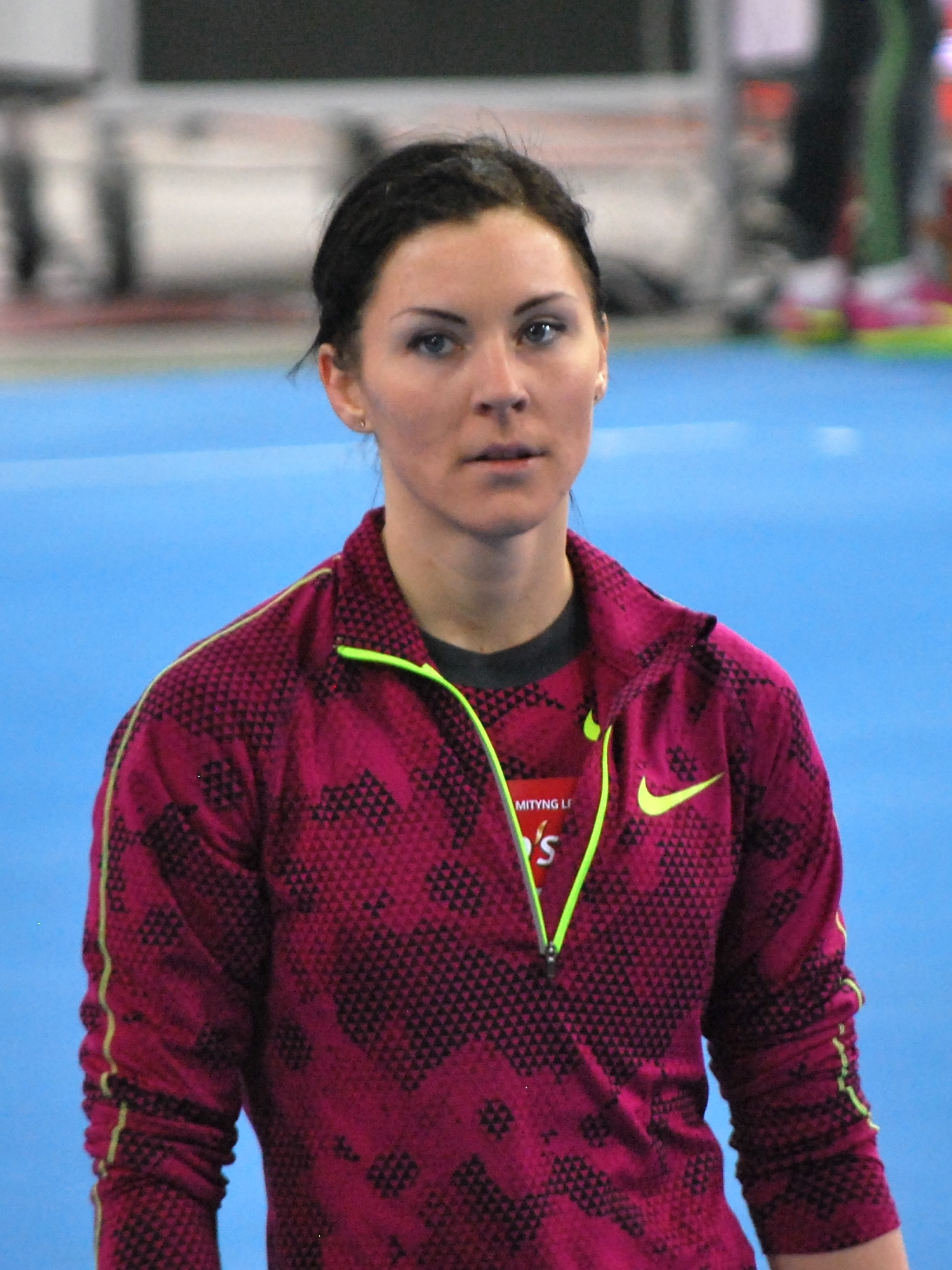

Personal information
- Born: 17 February 1990 (age 36) Budapest, Hungary
- Height: 1.73 m (5 ft 8 in)
- Weight: 58 kg (128 lb)

Sport
- Country: Hungary
- Sport: Athletics
- Event: High jump

Barbara Szabó (born 17 February 1990) is a Hungarian athlete specializing in the high jump. She represented Hungary at the 2013 World Championships without qualifying for the final. Her best outing is eighth place at the 2015 European Indoor Championships. She competed at the 2016 Summer Olympics.

She studied at Western State Colorado University.

Her personal best high jumps are 1.92 meters outdoors (Marseille 2015) and 1.93 meters indoors (Budapest 2015).

== Competition record ==
Year	Competition	Venue	Position	Notes
Representing Hungary
2007	World Youth Championships	Ostrava, Czech Republic	15th	1.65 m
2007	European Youth Olympic Festival	Belgrade, Serbia	13th (q)	1.70 m
2008	World Junior Championships	Bydgoszcz, Poland	30th (q)	1.65 m
2009	European Junior Championships	Novi Sad, Serbia	10th	1.80 m
2013	Universiade	Kazan, Russia	10th	1.80 m
2013	World Championships	Moscow, Russia	20th (q)	1.83 m
2014	European Championships	Zürich, Switzerland	17th (q)	1.85 m
2015	European Indoor Championships	Prague, Czech Republic	8th	1.85 m
2015	World Championships	Beijing, China	26th (q)	1.80 m
2016	European Championships	Amsterdam, Netherlands	9th	1.89 m
2016	Olympic Games	Rio de Janeiro, Brazil	32nd (q)	1.80 m
2022	European Championships	Munich, Germany	19th (q)	1.78 m
