= 2013 World Championships in Athletics – Women's high jump =

Women's high jump at the 2013 World Championships
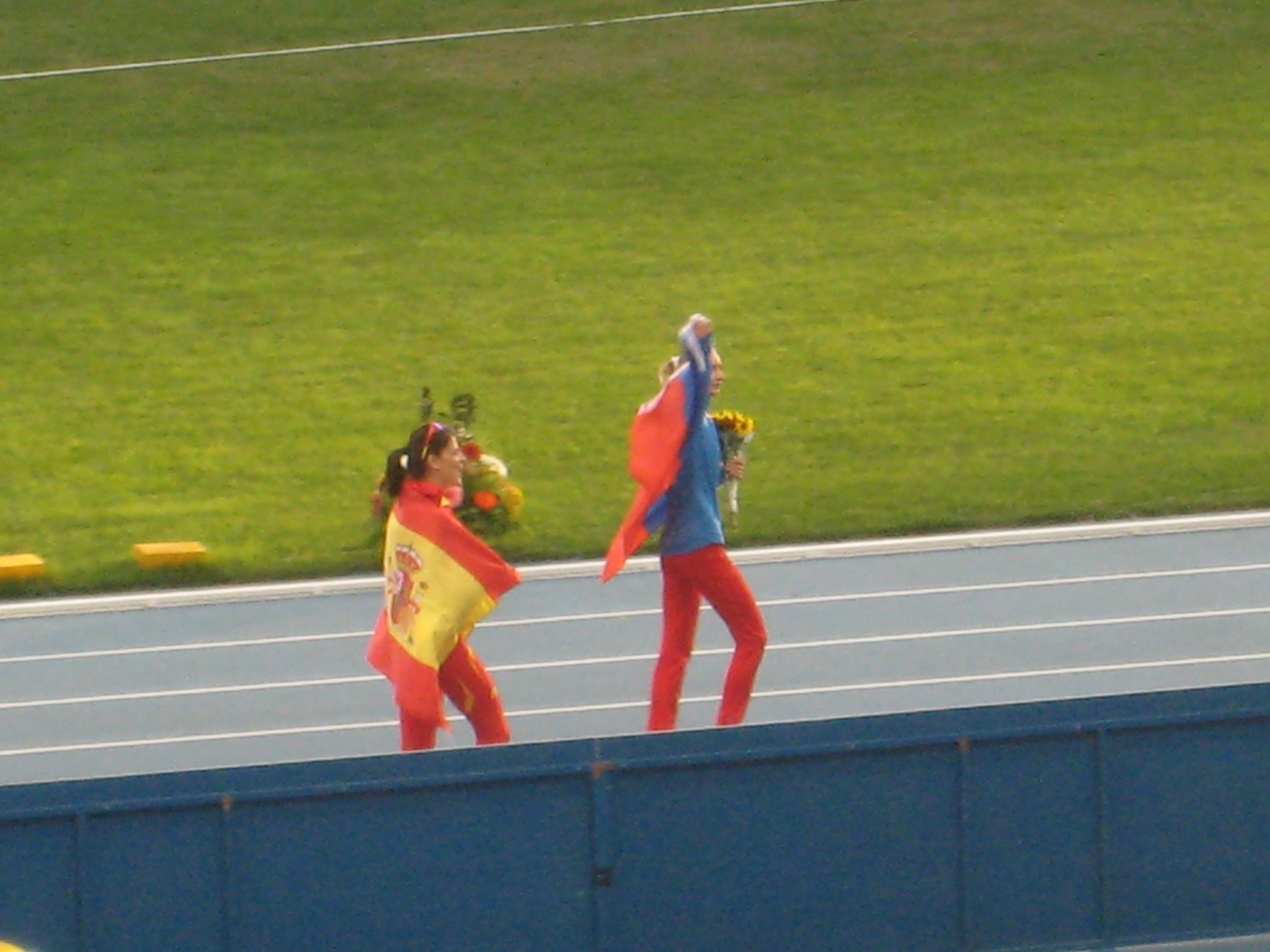
- Silver medalist Ruth Beitia and Svetlana Shkolina
- Venue: Luzhniki Stadium
- Dates: 15 August (qualification); 17 August (final)
- Competitors: 27 from 21 nations
- Winning height: 2.00 m (6 ft 6 1/2 in)

Medalists
gold medal	Brigetta Barrett; United States
silver medal	Ruth Beitia; Spain
silver medal	Anna Chicherova; Russia

Official Video

The women's high jump at the 2013 World Championships in Athletics was held at the Luzhniki Stadium on 15–17 August.

It took 1.92 to make the final. In the final, six competitors cleared 1.97, world leader and Olympic silver medalist Brigetta Barrett, Olympic gold medalist and defending champion Anna Chicherova, and European indoor champion Ruth Beitia still perfect. But at 2.00, only Barrett and Olympic bronze medalist Svetlana Shkolina made it, both on the first attempt, giving Barrett the lead and leaving Chicherova and Beitia tied for bronze. At 2.03, Shkolina reversed that position with a first attempt clearance. Barrett had no answer.

The answer came in February 2019 when Shkolina was handed a four-year ban for doping, retroactive to 2012, disqualifying her gold medal.

== Records ==
Prior to the competition, the records were as follows:

World record	Stefka Kostadinova (BUL)	2.09	Rome, Italy	30 August 1987
Championship record	Stefka Kostadinova (BUL)	2.09	Rome, Italy	30 August 1987
World leading	Brigetta Barrett (USA)	2.04	Des Moines, United States	22 June 2013
African record	Hestrie Cloete (RSA)	2.06	Paris, France	31 August 2003
Asian record	Marina Aitova (KAZ)	1.99	Athens, Greece	13 July 2009
North, Central American and Caribbean record	Chaunté Howard Lowe (USA)	2.05	Des Moines, United States	26 June 2010
South American record	Solange Witteveen (ARG)	1.96	Oristano, Italy	8 September 1997
European record	Stefka Kostadinova (BUL)	2.09	Rome, Italy	30 August 1987
Oceanian record	Vanessa Browne-Ward (AUS)	1.98	Perth, Australia	12 February 1989
Oceanian record	Alison Inverarity (AUS)	1.98	Ingolstadt, Germany	17 July 1994

== Schedule ==
Date	Time	Round
15 August 2013	09:40	Qualification
17 August 2013	18:00	Final

All times are local times (UTC+4)

== Results ==
KEY:	Q	Qualified	q	12 best performers	NR	National record	PB	Personal best	SB	Seasonal best

=== Qualification ===
Qualification: Qualifying Performance 1.95 (Q) or at least 12 best performers (q) advanced to the final.

Rank	Group	Name	Nationality	1.78	1.83	1.88	1.92	Mark	Notes
1	A	Irina Gordeeva	Russia	o	o	o	o	1.92	q
1	A	Anna Chicherova	Russia	–	–	o	o	1.92	q
1	A	Alessia Trost	Italy	o	o	o	o	1.92	q
1	A	Emma Green Tregaro	Sweden	–	–	o	o	1.92	q
1	B	Svetlana Shkolina	Russia	–	–	o	o	1.92	q
1	B	Airinė Palšytė	Lithuania	o	o	o	o	1.92	q
1	B	Ruth Beitia	Spain	–	o	o	o	1.92	q
8	B	Brigetta Barrett	United States	–	xxo	o	o	1.92	q
8	A	Zheng Xingjuan	China	–	o	xxo	o	1.92	q, SB
10	B	Kamila Stepaniuk	Poland	o	o	xo	xo	1.92	q
11	A	Justyna Kasprzycka	Poland	–	o	o	xxo	1.92	q
11	A	Levern Spencer	Saint Lucia	–	o	o	xxo	1.92	q
11	A	Marie-Laurence Jungfleisch	Germany	o	o	o	xxo	1.92	q
14	A	Nadiya Dusanova	Uzbekistan	–	o	o	xxx	1.88	
15	A	Oksana Okuneva	Ukraine	o	xo	o	xxx	1.88	
16	B	Maayan Furman-Shahaf	Israel	o	o	xo	xxx	1.88	
16	B	Anna Iljuštšenko	Estonia	–	o	xo	xxx	1.88	
18	A	Inika McPherson	United States	–	xxo	xo	xxx	1.88	
19	B	Ana Šimić	Croatia	xo	xo	xxo	xxx	1.88	
20	B	Barbara Szabó	Hungary	o	o	xxx		1.83	
20	B	Burcu Yüksel	Turkey	o	o	xxx		1.83	
20	B	Antonia Stergiou	Greece	o	o	xxx		1.83	
20	B	Yelena Slesarenko	Russia	o	o	xxx		1.83	
24	B	Jeanelle Scheper	Saint Lucia	xo	o	xxx		1.83	
25	A	Marina Aitova	Kazakhstan	o	xo	xxx		1.83	
26	B	Mirela Demireva	Bulgaria	o	xxo	xxx		1.83	
27	A	Miyuki Fukumoto	Japan	o	xxx			1.78	

=== Final ===
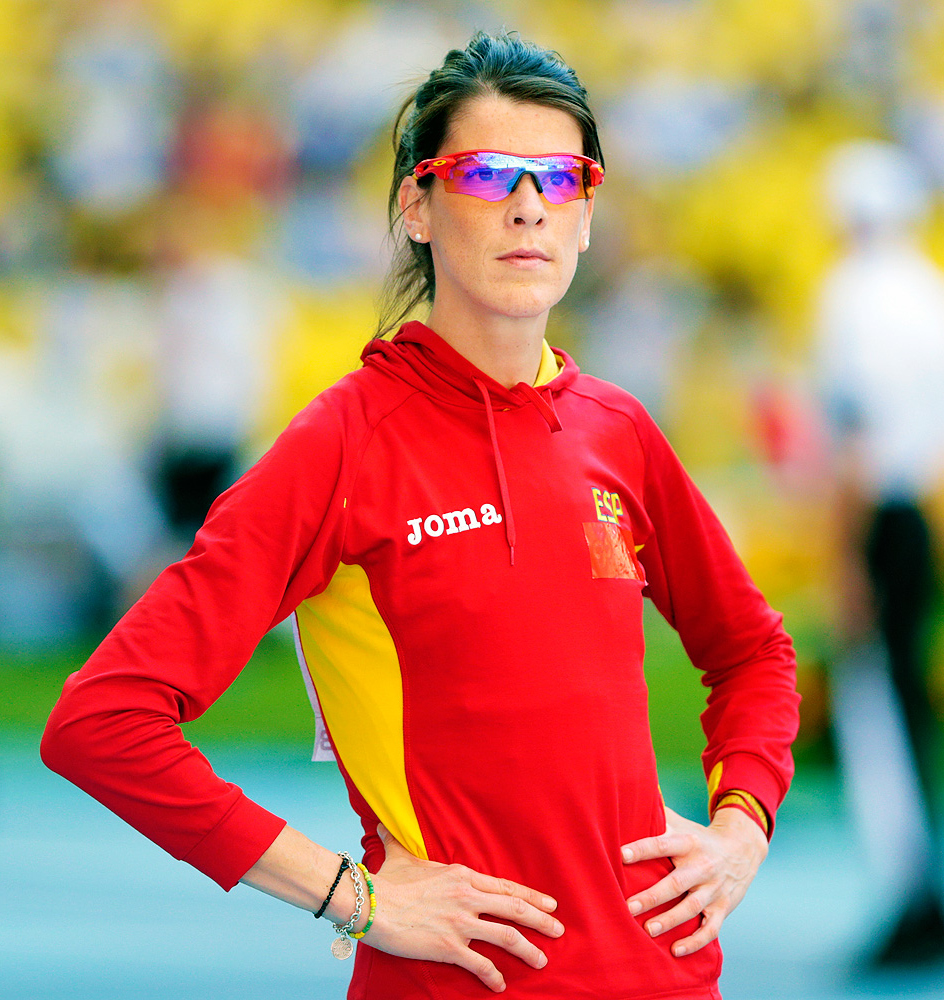
Silver medalist Ruth Beitia

The final was started at 18:00.

Rank	Name	Nationality	1.89	1.93	1.97	2.00	2.03	2.05	Mark	Notes
DSQ	Svetlana Shkolina	Russia	o	xo	o	o	o	xx-	2.03	PB
1st place, gold medalist(s)	Brigetta Barrett	United States	o	o	o	o	xxx		2.00	
2nd place, silver medalist(s)	Ruth Beitia	Spain	o	o	o	xxx			1.97	
2nd place, silver medalist(s)	Anna Chicherova	Russia	o	o	o	xxx			1.97	
4	Emma Green Tregaro	Sweden	o	xo	xo	xxx			1.97	SB
5	Justyna Kasprzycka	Poland	o	o	xxo	xxx			1.97	PB
6	Kamila Stepaniuk	Poland	o	o	xxx				1.93	
7	Alessia Trost	Italy	o	o	xxx				1.93	
8	Zheng Xingjuan	China	o	xo	xxx				1.93	SB
9	Irina Gordeeva	Russia	o	xo	xxx				1.93	
10	Levern Spencer	Saint Lucia	o	xxx					1.89	
11	Airinė Palšytė	Lithuania	xo	xxx					1.89	
	Marie-Laurence Jungfleisch	Germany	xxx						NM	
