= Ana Šimić =

Croatian high jumper

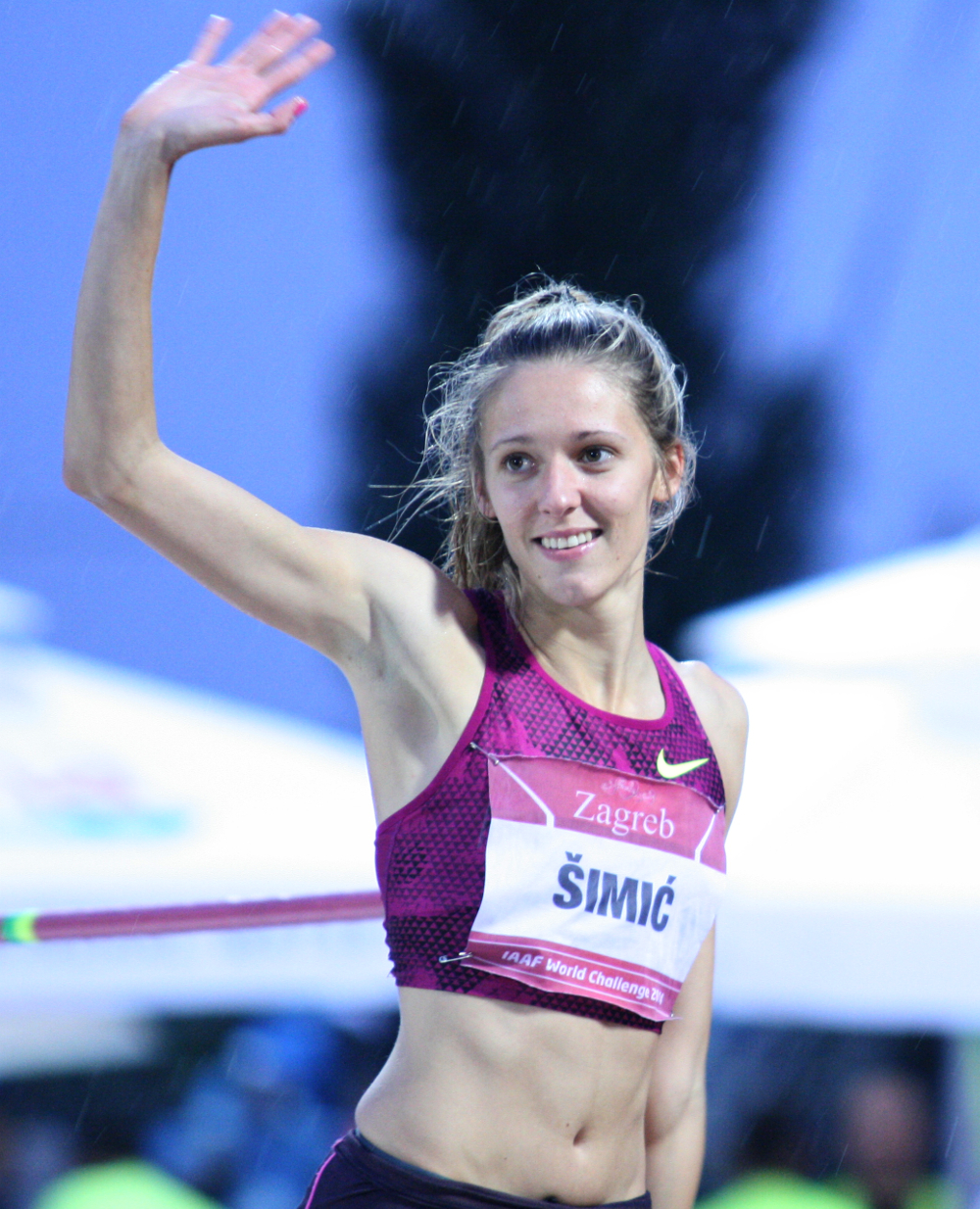
- Šimić in 2014

Personal information
- Born: 5 May 1990 (age 36) Gradačac, SR Bosnia and Herzegovina, Yugoslavia
- Height: 1.78 m (5 ft 10 in)
- Weight: 57 kg (126 lb)

Sport
- Country: Croatia
- Sport: Athletics
- Event: High jump

Achievements and titles
- Personal bests: High jump: Outdoor; 1.99 m (6 ft 6 1/4 in) (2014): Indoor; 1.95 m (6 ft 4 3/4 in) (2015)
Medal record
European Championships
| Bronze medal – third place | 2014 Zurich | High jump |
Mediterranean Games
| Gold medal – first place | 2013 Mersin | High jump |
Representing Europe
Continental Cup
| Bronze medal – third place | 2014 Marrakesh | High jump |

Ana Šimić (born 5 May 1990) is a Croatian athlete who competes in the high jump. She competed at the 2012, 2016, and 2020 Summer Olympics. Her personal best is 1.99 m (6 ft 6 in), set in August 2014 at the European Athletics Championships in Zurich.

== Competition record ==
| Year | Competition | Venue | Position | Notes |
Representing Croatia
| 2007 | World Youth Championships | Ostrava, Czech Republic | 21st (q) | 1.70 m |
| 2008 | World Junior Championships | Bydgoszcz, Poland | 14th (q) | 1.78 m |
| 2009 | European Junior Championships | Novi Sad, Serbia | 18th (q) | 1.73 m |
| 2010 | European Championships | Barcelona, Spain | 22nd (q) | 1.83 m |
| 2011 | European Indoor Championships | Paris, France | 20th (q) | 1.85 m |
| 2011 | European U23 Championships | Ostrava, Czech Republic | 7th | 1.90 m |
| 2011 | Universiade | Shenzhen, China | 11th | 1.81 m |
| 2012 | World Indoor Championships | Istanbul, Turkey | 14th (q) | 1.88 m |
| 2012 | European Championships | Helsinki, Finland | 20th (q) | 1.83 m |
| 2012 | Olympic Games | London, United Kingdom | 29th (q) | 1.80 m |
| 2013 | European Indoor Championships | Gothenburg, Sweden | 11th (q) | 1.89 m |
| 2013 | Mediterranean Games | Mersin, Turkey | 1st | 1.92 m |
| 2013 | World Championships | Moscow, Russia | 19th (q) | 1.88 m |
| 2014 | World Indoor Championships | Sopot, Poland | 16th (q) | 1.88 m |
| 2014 | European Championships | Zurich, Switzerland | 3rd | 1.99 m |
| 2014 | Diamond League | | 2nd | details |
| 2015 | World Championships | Beijing, China | 9th | 1.88 m |
| 2016 | European Championships | Amsterdam, Netherlands | 14th (q) | 1.89 m |
| 2016 | Olympic Games | Rio de Janeiro, Brazil | 22nd (q) | 1.89 m |
| 2017 | European Indoor Championships | Belgrade, Serbia | 7th | 1.89 m |
| 2017 | World Championships | London, United Kingdom | 25th (q) | 1.85 m |
| 2018 | European Championships | Berlin, Germany | 10th | 1.87 m |
| 2019 | European Indoor Championships | Glasgow, United Kingdom | 18th (q) | 1.85 m |
| 2019 | World Championships | Doha, Qatar | 7th | 1.93 m |
| 2021 | Olympic Games | Tokyo, Japan | 25th (q) | 1.86 m |
