= Brigetta Barrett =

American high jumper

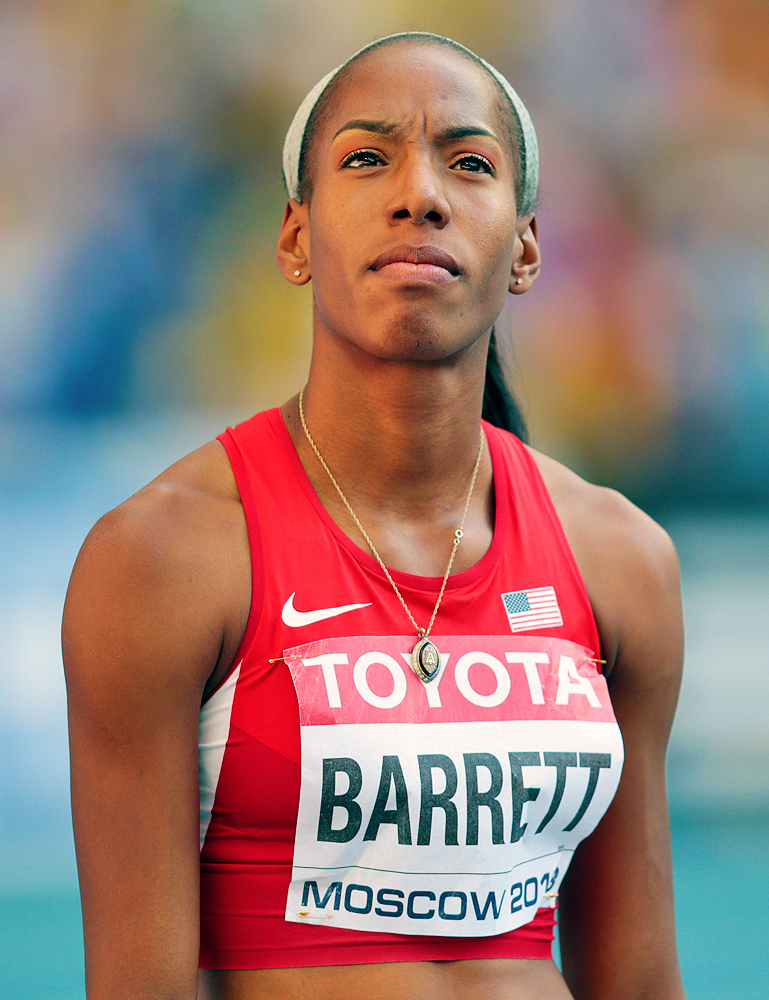
- Barrett at the 2013 World Championships in Athletics

Personal information
- Nickname: Bebe
- Born: Brigetta LaShea Barrett; December 24, 1990 (age 35) Westchester County, New York, U.S.
- Height: 6 ft 0 in (183 cm)
- Weight: 140 lb (64 kg)

Sport
- Country: United States
- Sport: Track and field
- Event: High jump
- Club: Arizona Wildcats
- Turned pro: 2012
- Coached by: Sheldon Blockburger
- Retired: 2016
Medal record
Women's athletics
Representing the United States
Olympic Games
Silver medal – second place	2012 London	High jump
World Championships
Gold medal – first place	2013 Moscow	High jump
Universiade
Gold medal – first place	2011 Shenzhen	High jump

Brigetta LaShea Barrett (born December 24, 1990), also known as Beloved Promise, is a former high jumper from the United States. Her biggest success is winning the silver medal at the 2012 Olympic Games in London and the gold medal at the 2013 World Championships in Moscow. She retired in 2016 at the age of 25 before coming back in 2017.

== Early career ==
As a high schooler in 2009, Barrett won the Texas Class 5A State Championship in the girls high jump.

In 2011 Barrett won the National Championships and World University Games in Shenzhen, China, jumping 1.96 m, a personal best. She also participated in the World Championships in Daegu, where she qualified for the final and placed 10th with 1.93 m.

=== 2012 and 2013: Olympic and World silver medals ===
In January, Barrett jumped 1.97 m indoors at the Fayetteville Invitational. She qualified for the 2012 Summer Olympics by placing second behind Chaunté Lowe at the US Olympic trials. At the Olympic Games in London, however, she jumped higher than Lowe and became silver medalist, by jumping 2.03m, a new personal best.

In 2013, Barrett won the NCAA Indoor Championships with a jump of 1.95 m. She also won the 2013 NCAA Outdoor Championships. She jumped a new world lead and personal best of 2.04 m in winning the US Championships. Barrett won silver at the World Championships in Moscow with a jump of 2.00 m. Barrett was a finalist for the 2013 Bowerman award.

=== Injuries and retirement (2016) ===
Barrett, who hails from Wappingers Falls, New York, jumped 6 ft 4 3/4 in (1.95 m) on June 6, 2014 at Rice University Track Stadium. Barrett placed third in the high jump in 1.91 m (6 ft 3 in) at 2014 US Outdoor Championships in Sacramento, California. Struggling with injuries, she decided not to jump and to miss the World Championships in Beijing in August 2015. She returned to high jump in January 2016 where she cleared 1.83 m. She decided to retire at the age of 25 and to concentrate herself on her own business. In April 2017, she went back on that decision and competed in the Drake Relays in Iowa.

== Personal ==
Barrett graduated from Duncanville High School in Duncanville, Texas (2009). Her high jump results earned her a scholarship at the University of Arizona where she graduated cum laude in May 2013, earning a bachelor's degree in theater arts.

In 2024, she was using the name Beloved Promise.

== Achievements ==
Year	Competition	Venue	Position	Event	Notes
Representing United States
2011	World Championships	Daegu, South Korea	9th	High jump	1.93 m
2011	Universiade	Shenzhen, China	1st	High jump	1.96 m
2012	Olympic Games	London, England, United Kingdom	2nd	High jump	2.03 m
2013	World Championships	Moscow, Russia	1st	High jump	2.00 m

Sporting positions
Preceded by (Russia) Anna Chicherova	Women's High Jump Best Year Performance; 2013	Succeeded by (Russia) Maria Kuchina (Russia) Anna Chicherova (Spain) Ruth Beitia
