= Track and field at the 2015 Military World Games – Women's high jump =

The women's high jump event at the 2015 Military World Games was held on 4 October at the KAFAC Sports Complex.

== Records ==
Prior to this competition, the existing world and CISM record were as follows:

| World Record | Stefka Kostadinova (BUL) | 2.09 | Rome, Italy | 30 August 1987 |
| CISM World Record | Tatyana Motkova (RUS) | 2.00 | Rome, Italy | September 1995 |

== Schedule ==
| Date | Time | Round |
|---|---|---|
| 4 October 2015 | 15:00 | Final |

== Medalists ==
| Gold | Silver | Bronze |
|---|---|---|
| Maria Kuchina; Russia | Iryna Gerashchenko; Ukraine | Alina Rotaru; Romania |

== Results ==
=== Final ===
| Rank | Athlete | Nationality | 1.70 | 1.75 | 1.80 | 1.84 | 1.88 | 1.91 | 1.94 | 1.95 | 2.02 | Result | Notes |
|---|---|---|---|---|---|---|---|---|---|---|---|---|---|
| 1st place, gold medalist(s) | Maria Kuchina | Russia | - | - | o | o | o | - | - | o | xxx | 1.95 | |
| 2nd place, silver medalist(s) | Iryna Gerashchenko | Ukraine | o | o | o | xxo | xxx | | | | | 1.84 | |
| 3rd place, bronze medalist(s) | Alina Rotaru | Romania | o | o | o | xxx | | | | | | 1.80 | |
| 4 | Yulimar Rojas | Venezuela | o | xo | o | xxx | | | | | | 1.80 | |
| 5 | Caroline Cherotich | Kenya | o | xxx | | | | | | | | 1.70 | |
| | Margaryta Tverdokhlib | Ukraine | xxx | | | | | | | | | NM | |
