= 2012 World Junior Championships in Athletics – Women's high jump =

The women's high jump at the 2012 World Junior Championships in Athletics will be held at the Estadi Olímpic Lluís Companys on 13 and 15 July.

== Medalists ==
Gold	Silver	Bronze
Alessia Trost; Italy	Lissa Labiche; Seychelles	Maria Kuchina; Russia

== Records ==
Prior to the competition, the existing world junior and championship records were as follows.

World Junior Record	Olga Turchak (URS)	2.01 m	Moscow, Soviet Union	7 July 1986
World Junior Record	Heike Balck (GDR)	2.01 m	Karl-Marx-Stadt, East Germany	18 June 1989
Championship Record	Alina Astafei (ROU)	2.00 m	Sudbury, Canada	29 July 1988
World Junior Leading	Alessia Trost (ITA)	1.92 m	Gorizia, Italy	19 May 2012

== Results ==
=== Qualification ===
Qualification: Standard 1.84 m (Q) or at least best 12 qualified (q)

Rank	Group	Name	Nationality	1.65	1.70	1.75	1.79	1.82	1.84	Result	Notes
1	B	Alessia Trost	Italy	–	o	o	o	o	o	1.84	Q
1	A	Lissa Labiche	Seychelles	–	–	o	o	o	o	1.84	Q
3	A	Maria Kuchina	Russia	–	–	xo	o	o	o	1.84	Q
4	B	Melina Brenner	Germany	–	o	xo	o	xo	o	1.84	Q
5	B	Iryna Gerashchenko	Ukraine	–	o	o	o	xo	xo	1.84	Q
6	B	Dior Delophont	France	–	o	o	o	o	xxo	1.84	Q
7	A	Alexandra Plaza	Germany	–	o	o	o	xo	xxo	1.84	Q
8	B	Julia du Plessis	South Africa	o	o	o	o	o	xxx	1.82	q
8	B	Oksana Krasnokutskaya	Russia	–	o	o	o	o	xxx	1.82	q
10	A	Gintaré Nesteckyté	Lithuania	o	xo	o	o	o	xxx	1.82	q
11	B	Jeanelle Scheper	Saint Lucia	–	o	o	o	xo	xxx	1.82	q
12	A	Chanice Porter	Jamaica	-	o	–	xo	xo	xxx	1.82	q
12	A	Ye Jiaying	China	o	o	o	xo	xo	xxx	1.82	q
14	B	Ligia Grozav	Romania	–	o	o	xo	xxx		1.79	
15	A	Tatiána Goúsin	Greece	o	o	xo	xo	xxx		1.79	
16	B	Taylor Burke	United States	–	o	xxo	xo	xxx		1.79	
17	A	Undine Dindune	Latvia	o	o	xo	xxo	xxx		1.79	
18	B	María Priscilla Schlegel	Spain	o	o	o	xxx			1.75	
19	A	Ida Virdebrant	Sweden	o	o	xo	xxx			1.75	
19	A	Senni Ronkainen	Finland	o	o	xo	xxx			1.75	
19	B	Leontia Kallenou	Cyprus	o	o	xo	xxx			1.75	
22	A	Lisanne Hagens	Netherlands	o	o	xxo	xxx			1.75	
22	A	Maddie Morrow	United States	o	o	xxo	xxx			1.75	
22	A	N. M. Siriwardana Herath Mudiyanselage	Sri Lanka	–	o	xxo	xxx			1.75	
25	B	Lucija Zubcic	Croatia	–	xo	xxo	xxx			1.75	
25	A	Kaitlin Morgan	Australia	xo	o	xxo	xxx			1.75	
27	B	Kimberly Williamson	Jamaica	–	o	–	xxx			1.70	
27	A	Wai Yee Fung	Hong Kong	–	o	xxx				1.70	
29	B	Meng-Chia Wu	Chinese Taipei	xxo	o	xxx				1.70	
30	B	Midori Kamijima	Japan	o	xo	xxx				1.70	SB
30	A	Kadriye Aydin	Turkey	o	xo	xxx				1.70	
30	A	Tamara Biryuk	Ukraine	o	xo	xxx				1.70	
33	B	Anne Engen Andersen	Norway	o	xxo	xxx				1.70	
34	B	Eglé Roceviciüté	Lithuania	o	xxx					1.65	

=== Final ===
Rank	Name	Nationality	1.68	1.73	1.78	1.82	1.85	1.88	1.91	1.95	Result	Notes
1st place, gold medalist(s)	Alessia Trost	Italy	–	o	o	xxo	o	xxo	xo	xxx	1.91	
2nd place, silver medalist(s)	Lissa Labiche	Seychelles	–	–	o	o	o	o	xxx		1.88	NJ
3rd place, bronze medalist(s)	Maria Kuchina	Russia	–	–	o	o	o	xxo	xxx		1.88	
4	Alexandra Plaza	Germany	–	o	o	o	xo	xxo	xxx		1.88	PB
5	Dior Delophont	France	–	o	o	o	o	xxx			1.85	
6	Melina Brenner	Germany	o	o	o	xo	xxo	xxx			1.85	
7	Iryna Gerashchenko	Ukraine	–	o	o	xxo	xxo	xxx			1.85	
8	Jeanelle Scheper	Saint Lucia	–	–	xo	xxo	xxx				1.82	
9	Ye Jiaying	China	o	o	o	xxx					1.78	
9	Gintaré Nesteckyté	Lithuania	o	o	o	xxx					1.78	
11	Oksana Krasnokutskaya	Russia	–	o	xo	xxx					1.78	
12	Julia du Plessis	South Africa	o	xo	xxo	xxx					1.78	
13	Chanice Porter	Jamaica	–	xo	xxx						1.73	

== Participation ==
According to an unofficial count, 34 athletes from 28 countries participated in the event.

- Australia (1)
- China (1)
- Chinese Taipei (1)
- Croatia (1)
- Cyprus (1)
- Finland (1)
- France (1)
- Germany (2)
- Greece (1)
- Hong Kong (1)
- Italy (1)
- Jamaica (2)
- Japan (1)
- Latvia (1)
- Lithuania (2)
- Netherlands (1)
- Norway (1)
- Romania (1)
- Russia (2)
- Saint Lucia (1)
- Seychelles (1)
- South Africa (1)
- Spain (1)
- Sri Lanka (1)
- Sweden (1)
- Turkey (1)
- Ukraine (2)
- United States (2)
