= Justyna Kasprzycka =

Polish high jumper (born 1987)

Justyna Kasprzycka-Pyra
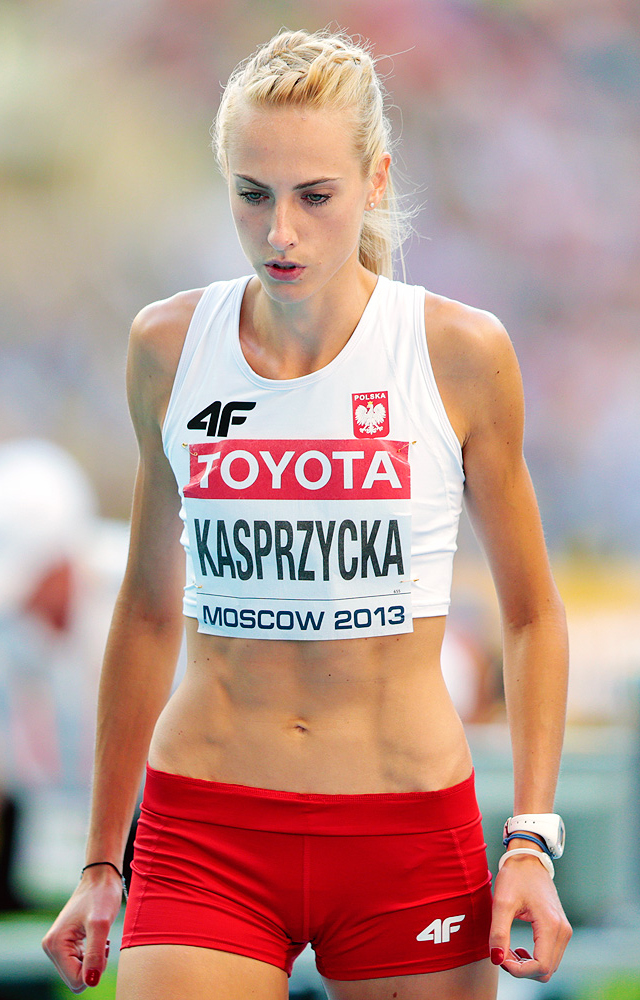
- Justyna Kasprzycka at 2013 World Championships in Athletics

Personal information
- Nationality: Poland
- Born: 20 August 1987 (age 38) Głubczyce, Poland
- Height: 1.83 m (6 ft 0 in)
- Weight: 61 kg (134 lb)

Sport
- Sport: Athletics
- Event: High jump
- College team: Academy of Physical Education in Wroclaw
- Club: Victoria Racibórz (2001–2005); AZS-AWF Wrocław (since 2005)

Justyna Kasprzycka-Pyra (born 20 August 1987 in Głubczyce) is a Polish athlete specializing in the high jump. She finished fifth at the 2013 World Championships in Athletics.

Her personal bests in the event are 1.99 metres outdoors (Eugene 2014) and 1.97 metres indoors (Sopot 2014).

== Competition record ==
Year	Competition	Venue	Position	Notes
Representing Poland
2007	European U23 Championships	Debrecen, Hungary	9th	1.82 m
2009	European U23 Championships	Kaunas, Lithuania	9th	1.79 m
2013	Universiade	Kazan, Russia	8th	1.84 m
2013	World Championships	Moscow, Russia	5th	1.97 m
2013	Jeux de la Francophonie	Nice, France	2nd	1.88 m
2014	World Indoor Championships	Sopot, Poland	4th	1.97 m
2014	European Championships	Zürich, Switzerland	4th	1.99 m
2015	European Indoor Championships	Prague, Czech Republic	6th	1.94 m
