= Mariya Lasitskene =

Russian high jumper (born 1993)

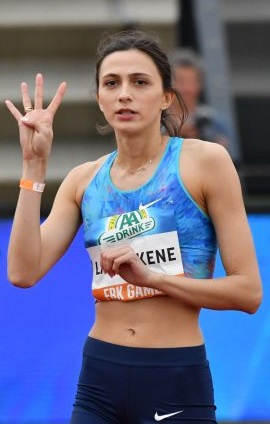
- Lasitskene in 2017

Personal information
- Nationality: Russian
- Born: Mariya Aleksandrovna Kuchina; 14 January 1993 (age 33) Prokhladny, Kabardino-Balkaria, Russia
- Height: 180 cm (5 ft 11 in)
- Weight: 57 kg (126 lb)

Sport
- Country: Russia; Authorised Neutral Athletes (2017–19)
- Sport: Athletics
- Event: High jump

Achievements and titles
- Olympic finals: 2020 Tokyo; High jump, Gold
- World finals: 2015 Beijing; High jump, Gold; 2017 London; High jump, Gold; 2019 Doha; High jump, Gold
- Personal bests: High jump: Outdoor; 2.06 m (6 ft 9 in) (Lausanne 2017/Ostrava 2019): Indoor; 2.05 m (6 ft 8 1/2 in) (Moscow 2020)
Medal record
Senior level
Event	1st	2nd	3rd
Olympic Games	1	0	0
World Championships	3	0	0
World Indoor Championships	2	0	0
European Championships	1	1	0
European Indoor Championships	2	0	0
Total	9	1	0
Representing ROC
Olympic Games
Gold medal – first place	2020 Tokyo	High jump
Representing Authorised Neutral Athletes
World Championships
Gold medal – first place	2017 London	High jump
Gold medal – first place	2019 Doha	High jump
World Indoor Championships
Gold medal – first place	2018 Birmingham	High jump
European Championships
Gold medal – first place	2018 Berlin	High jump
European Indoor Championships
Gold medal – first place	2019 Glasgow	High jump
Representing Russia
World Championships
Gold medal – first place	2015 Beijing	High jump
World Indoor Championships
Gold medal – first place	2014 Sopot	High jump
Military World Games
Gold medal – first place	2015 Mungyeong	High jump
Gold medal – first place	2019 Wuhan	High jump
European Championships
Silver medal – second place	2014 Zurich	High jump
European Indoor Championships
Gold medal – first place	2015 Praha	High jump
European Junior Championships
Gold medal – first place	2011 Tallinn	High jump
Youth Olympic Games
Gold medal – first place	2010 Singapore	High jump
World Junior Championships
Bronze medal – third place	2012 Barcelona	High jump
World Youth Championships
Silver medal – second place	2009 Brixen	High jump
Representing Europe
Continental Cup
Gold medal – first place	2014 Marrakesh	High jump
Gold medal – first place	2018 Ostrava	High jump

Mariya Aleksandrovna Lasitskene (Russian: Мария Александровна Ласицкене, pronounced [mɐˈrʲijə ləsʲɪtsˈkʲenɨ]; née Kuchina; born 14 January 1993) is a Russian athlete who specialises in the high jump. She is the 2020 Olympic champion and three-time world champion (2015, 2017, and 2019). With her victory in Tokyo, Lasitskene became the fourth female high jumper in history (after Stefka Kostadinova, Heike Henkel & Anna Chicherova) to win gold at both the Olympic Games and the World Championships.

Lasitskene was not able to defend her Olympic high jump title due to a World Athletics ruling banning Russian track and field athletes from competing in the 2024 Summer Olympics.

== Career ==
Lasitskene won her first international medal at the 2009 World Youth Championships in Athletics, where she cleared a personal best of 1.85 m to take the silver medal behind Italian Alessia Trost. She was also the silver medallist at the 2009 European Youth Olympic Festival and 2009 Gymnasiade. In the inaugural 2010 Summer Youth Olympics, Lasitskene won a gold medal in the girls' high jump with a clearance of 1.89 m, ahead of Alessia Trost.

She started her 2011 season with a major scalp in the form of Yelena Slesarenko, who she defeated with an indoor best jump of 1.90 m. A greater effort soon followed on the Moravia High Jump Tour meet in Třinec, as she cleared 1.97 m to claim the world junior indoor best which Desislava Aleksandrova had held since 1994.

Lasitskene has also won an ex-aequo gold medal at the 2014 World Indoor Championships and a silver at the 2014 European Championships. At the 2015 European Indoor Championships she won gold as she did later at the 2015 World Championships with a personal best of 2.01 m.

Following her world championships win, she was considered a favorite to win the Olympic title at the 2016 Summer Olympics in Rio de Janeiro. However, she was barred from competing when the CAS upheld their decision to ban the Russian Track and Field Federation from the Games for systematic doping. At a domestic competition she jumped a height of 2.00 m—a height that would have easily won gold in Rio. In April 2017, her application to compete as a neutral athlete until Russia is reinstated was accepted; this allows Lasitskene to resume competition despite the Federation's ban. Her first competition back was the third Diamond League in the series at Eugene. She won the women's high jump with a personal best and world leading height of 2.03 m.

She improved to 2.04 m on 11 June 2017 in Hengelo. On 6 July 2017, she set a new personal best at the Diamond League in Lausanne with a height of 2.06 m, a Diamond League record. She followed up her strong performances in the Diamond League competitions by defending her world title later in London on 12 August 2017 with a height of 2.03 m.

Lasitskene wrote on Instagram regarding Russia's ban from international athletics that she was "totally not surprised about this outcome" and planned to compete under a neutral flag. "The only thing that confuses us is that the athletes are alone in their struggle, and the leaders of our sport all this time have been protecting us only in words," Lasitskene said. She denies the existence of state-sponsored doping in Russia, but puts the blame on the Russian officials for "insufficiently defending the Russian athletes against the West."

== International competitions ==
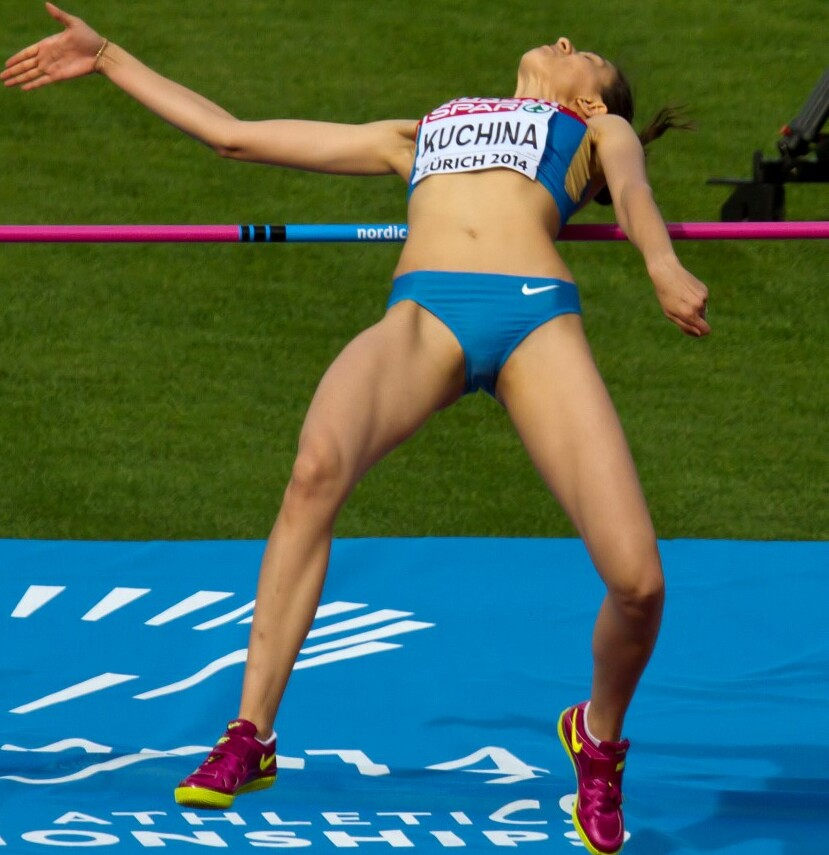
Lasitskene at the 2014 European Championships, winning the silver

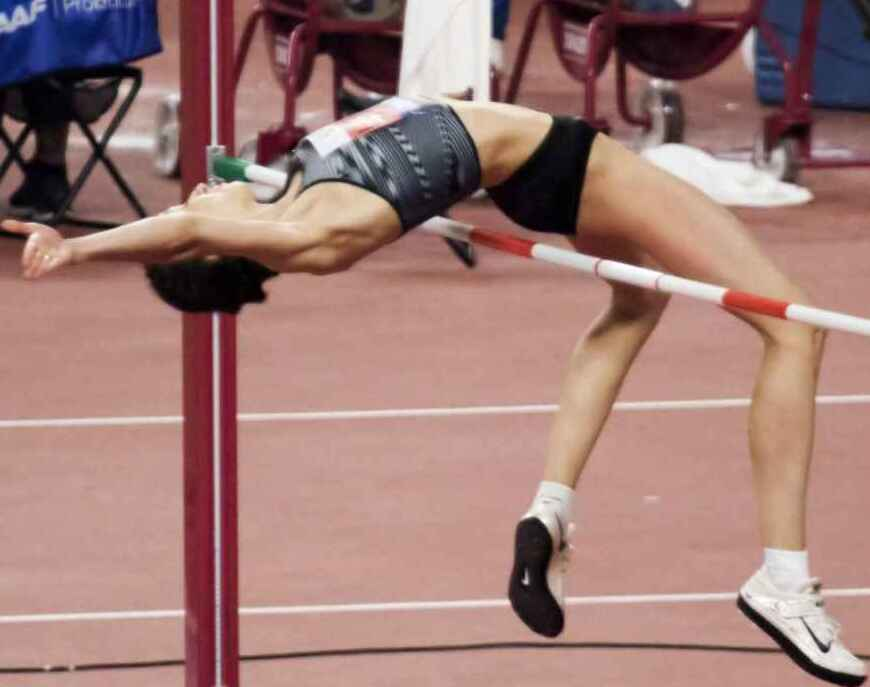
Lasitskene at the 2019 World Championships where she won her record breaking third World title

Year	Competition	Venue	Position	Notes
2009	World Youth Championships	Brixen, Italy	2nd	1.85 m
2009	European Youth Olympics	Tampere, Finland	2nd	1.85 m
2010	Youth Olympic Games	Singapore	1st	1.89 m
2011	European Indoor Championships	Paris, France	9th	1.92 m
2011	European Junior Championships	Tallinn, Estonia	1st	1.95 m
2012	World Junior Championships	Barcelona, Spain	3rd	1.88 m
2013	Universiade	Kazan, Russia	2nd	1.96 m
2014	World Indoor Championships	Sopot, Poland	1st	2.00 m
2014	European Championships	Zurich, Switzerland	2nd	1.99 m
2014	Diamond League		1st	details
2015	European Indoor Championships	Prague, Czech Republic	1st	1.97 m
2015	European U23 Championships	Tallinn, Estonia	12th	1.71 m
2015	World Championships	Beijing, China	1st	2.01 m
2015	Diamond League		2nd	details
2015	Military World Games	Mungyeong, South Korea	1st	1.95 m
2017	World Championships	London, United Kingdom	1st	2.03 m
2017	Diamond League		1st	details
2018	World Indoor Championships	Birmingham, United Kingdom	1st	2.01 m
2018	European Championships	Berlin, Germany	1st	2.00 m
2018	Diamond League		1st	details
2019	European Indoor Championships	Glasgow, United Kingdom	1st	2.01 m
2019	World Championships	Doha, Qatar	1st	2.04 m
2019	Diamond League		1st	details
2019	Military World Games	Wuhan, China	1st	2.01 m
2021	Olympic Games	Tokyo, Japan	1st	2.04 m
2021	Diamond League		1st	details

== Personal bests ==
Event	Best (m)	Venue	Date
High jump (outdoor)	2.06 m (6 ft 9 in)	Lausanne	6 July 2017
High jump (indoor)	2.05 m (6 ft 8 1/2 in)	Moscow	9 February 2020

== Winning streak (45) ==
From 1 July 2016 to 30 June 2018 Lasitskene won 45 competitions in a row. On 13 July 2018, her streak was broken in Rabat, one of the IAAF Diamond League meetings, where she placed third.

1. V All-Russian Summer Universiade – Smolensk, Russia (1.90 m)
2. Russian Cup – Zhukovsky, Russia (2.00 m)
3. Stars of 2016 – Moscow, Russia (1.88 m)
4. Y. Lukashevich and V. Seredkin Memorial – Chelyabinsk, Russia (1.94 m, indoors)
5. N. G. Ozolin and V. M. Dyachkov Memorial – Moscow, Russia (2.00 m, indoors)
6. Governor Cup – Volgograd, Russia (1.95 m, indoors)
7. Russian Winter Meeting – Moscow, Russia (1.91 m, indoors)
8. Merited Master of the USSR V. I. Alekseev Memorial – Saint Petersburg, Russia (1.96 m, indoors)
9. 2017 Russian Indoor Athletics Championships – Moscow, Russia (2.03 m, indoors)
10. Prefontaine Classic – Eugene, United States (2.03 m)
11. 12th Opole Festival of Jumpers – Opole, Poland (2.00 m)
12. Golden Gala Pietro Mennea – Rome, Italy (2.00)
13. FBK Games – Hengelo, Netherlands (2.04 m)
14. Paavo Nurmi Games – Turku, Finland (1.95 m)
15. V. M. Evstratov Memorial – Zhukovsky, Russia (1.97 m)
16. Bauhaus-Galan – Stockholm, Sweden (2.00 m)
17. Moscow Oblast Championships – Zhukovsky, Russia (2.00 m)
18. Brothers Znamensky Memorial – Zhukovsky, Russia (1.95 m)
19. Athletissima – Lausanne, Switzerland (2.06 m)
20. Anniversary Games – London, Great Britain (2.00 m)
21. Russian Cup – Yerino, Russia (2.01 m)
22. Atletica Mondiale – Padua, Italy (2.00 m)
23. Herculis – Monaco (2.05 m)
24. 2017 Russian Athletics Championships – Zhukovsky, Russia (1.96 m)
25. 2017 World Athletics Championships – London, Great Britain (2.03 m)
26. Kamila Skolimowska Memorial – Warsaw, Poland (1.95 m)
27. Memorial Van Damme – Brussels, Belgium (2.02 m)
28. Christmas Starts – Minsk, Belarus (2.00 m, indoors)
29. Y. Lukashevich and V. Seredkin Memorial – Chelyabinsk, Russia (1.95 m, indoors)
30. N. G. Ozolin and V. M. Dyachkov Memorial – Moscow, Russia (2.01 m, indoors)
31. Battle of the Sexes – Moscow, Russia (1.99 m, indoors)
32. Stalingrad Cup – Volgograd, Russia (2.04 m, indoors)
33. Banskobystrická latka – Banská Bystrica, Slovakia (2.02 m, indoors)
34. Madrid Indoor – Madrid, Spain (2.00 m, indoors)
35. 2018 Russian Indoor Athletics Championships – Moscow, Russia (1.88 m, indoors)
36. Copernicus Cup – Toruń, Poland (2.00 m, indoors)
37. Muller Indoor Grand Prix Glasgow – Glasgow, Scotland (1.95 m, indoors)
38. 2018 World Indoor Athletics Championships – Birmingham, Great Britain (2.01 m, indoors)
39. Shanghai Golden Grand Prix – Shanghai, China (1.97 m)
40. Golden Gala Pietro Mennea – Rome, Italy (2.02 m)
41. FBK Games – Hengelo, Netherlands (2.03 m)
42. Bauhaus-Galan – Stockholm, Sweden (2.00 m)
43. Opole Festival of Jumpers – Opole, Poland (1.94 m)
44. V. M. Evstratov Memorial – Zhukovsky, Russia (2.01 m)
45. Meeting de Paris – Paris, France (2.04 m)

== Personal life ==
Lasitskene was awarded the rank of senior lieutenant of the Russian Armed Forces after winning the 2017 IAAF World Championships.

Mariya married Russian sports journalist and Eurosport commentator of Lithuanian descent Vladas "Tashev" Lasickas on 17 March 2017. She then took her husband's family name.

== See also ==
- Female two metres club
- List of World Athletics Championships medalists (women)
- List of IAAF World Indoor Championships medalists (women)
- List of European Athletics Championships medalists (women)
- List of European Athletics Indoor Championships medalists (women)
- High jump at the World Championships in Athletics
- Authorised Neutral Athletes at the World Athletics Championships

Sporting positions
Preceded by Brigetta Barrett	Women's High Jump Best Year Performance; 2014 (tied with Anna Chicherova and Ruth Beitia)	Succeeded by Anna Chicherova
