= 2016 IAAF World Indoor Championships – Women's high jump =

Women's high jump at the 2016 IAAF World Indoor Championships
- Venue: Oregon Convention Center
- Dates: March 20
- Competitors: 11 from 10 nations
- Winning height: 1.96

Medalists
gold medal	Vashti Cunningham	United States
silver medal	Ruth Beitia	Spain
bronze medal	Kamila Lićwinko	Poland

The women's high jump at the 2016 IAAF World Indoor Championships took place on March 20, 2016.

Four athletes were perfect through 1.93, Sofie Skoog, Lavern Spencer, masters world record holder Ruth Beitia and still in high school, Vashti Cunningham, the new indoor world junior record holder. Airinė Palšytė and Kamila Lićwinko also managed the height but with several misses in the competition. At 1.96, Cunningham cleared it with room to spare on her first attempt, keeping the perfect round going, which turned out to be the gold medal performance. Beitia and Lićwinko cleared it on their second attempt with Beitia's perfect round beforehand being the difference for her silver medal. Palšytė also cleared 1.96 on her last attempt, but it was too little, too late. All athletes tried 1.99. The three medalists had been over 1.99 in the past but nobody made it on this day.

Cunningham becomes the youngest female Indoor World Champion, just one day older than the youngest male, Mohammed Aman from the 2012 Championships.

== Results ==
The final was started 13:00.

Rank	Athlete	Nationality	1.84	1.89	1.93	1.96	1.99	Result	Notes
1st place, gold medalist(s)	Vashti Cunningham	United States	o	o	o	o	xxx	1.96	
2nd place, silver medalist(s)	Ruth Beitia	Spain	o	o	o	xo	xxx	1.96	
3rd place, bronze medalist(s)	Kamila Lićwinko	Poland	xo	o	xo	xo	xxx	1.96	
4	Airinė Palšytė	Lithuania	xo	o	xxo	xxo	xxx	1.96	
5	Sofie Skoog	Sweden	o	o	o	xxx		1.93	
5	Levern Spencer	Saint Lucia	o	o	o	xxx		1.93	
7	Alessia Trost	Italy	o	o	xo	xxx		1.93	
8	Erika Kinsey	Sweden	o	xxo	xxo	xxx		1.93	SB
9	Doreen Amata	Nigeria	o	o	xxx			1.89	
10	Lissa Labiche	Seychelles	o	xxo	xxx			1.89	NR
10	Isobel Pooley	Great Britain	o	xxo	xxx			1.89	
	Priscilla Frederick	Antigua and Barbuda						DNS	
