= Marie-Laurence Jungfleisch =

German high jumper (born 1990)

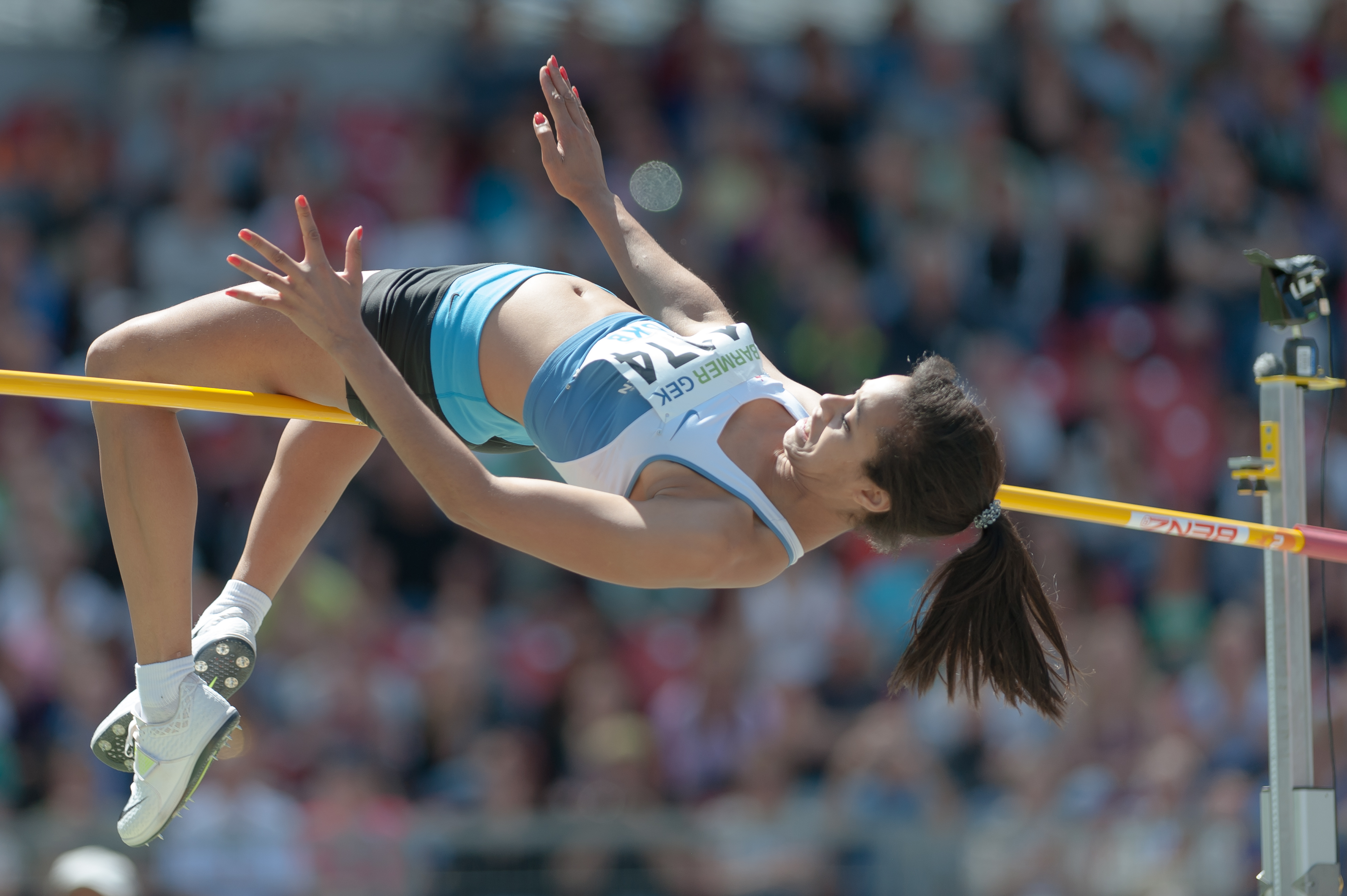
- Jungfleisch in 2015

Personal information
- Born: 7 October 1990 (age 35) Paris, France
- Height: 1.82 m (6 ft 0 in)
- Weight: 68 kg (150 lb)

Sport
- Country: Germany
- Sport: Athletics
- Event: High jump
Medal record
Women's athletics
Representing Germany
European Championships
Bronze medal – third place	2018 Berlin	High jump

Marie-Laurence Jungfleisch (born 7 October 1990 in Paris, France) is a German athlete specialising in the high jump. She finished fourth at the 2017 World Championships and won the bronze medal at the 2018 European Championships.

== Early life ==
Her father is from the French island of Martinique and her mother is German. As a six-year-old, she moved with her family to Freiburg im Breisgau.

== Career ==
She has personal bests of 2.00 metres outdoor (2016) and 1.97 metres indoors (2014).

== Competition record ==
Year	Competition	Venue	Position	Notes
Representing Germany
2009	European Junior Championships	Novi Sad, Serbia	6th	1.80 m
2011	European Indoor Championships	Paris, France	15th (q)	1.89 m
2011	European U23 Championships	Ostrava, Czech Republic	8th	1.87 m
2012	European Championships	Helsinki, Finland	13th (q)	1.87 m
2013	World Championships	Moscow, Russia	11th (q)	1.92 m (Note: No mark in the final.)
2014	World Indoor Championships	Sopot, Poland	8th	1.90 m
2014	European Championships	Zürich, Switzerland	5th	1.97 m
2015	World Championships	Beijing, China	6th	1.99 m
2016	European Championships	Amsterdam, Netherlands	5th	1.93 m
2016	Olympic Games	Rio de Janeiro, Brazil	7th	1.93 m
2017	European Indoor Championships	Belgrade, Serbia	16th (q)	1.86 m
2017	World Championships	London, United Kingdom	4th	1.95 m
2018	European Championships	Berlin, Germany	3rd	1.96 m
2021	Olympic Games	Tokyo, Japan	10th	1.93 m
2022	World Championships	Eugene, United States	21st (q)	1.86 m
2022	European Championships	Munich, Germany	6th	1.90 m
