= Valentina Liashenko =

Georgian high jumper

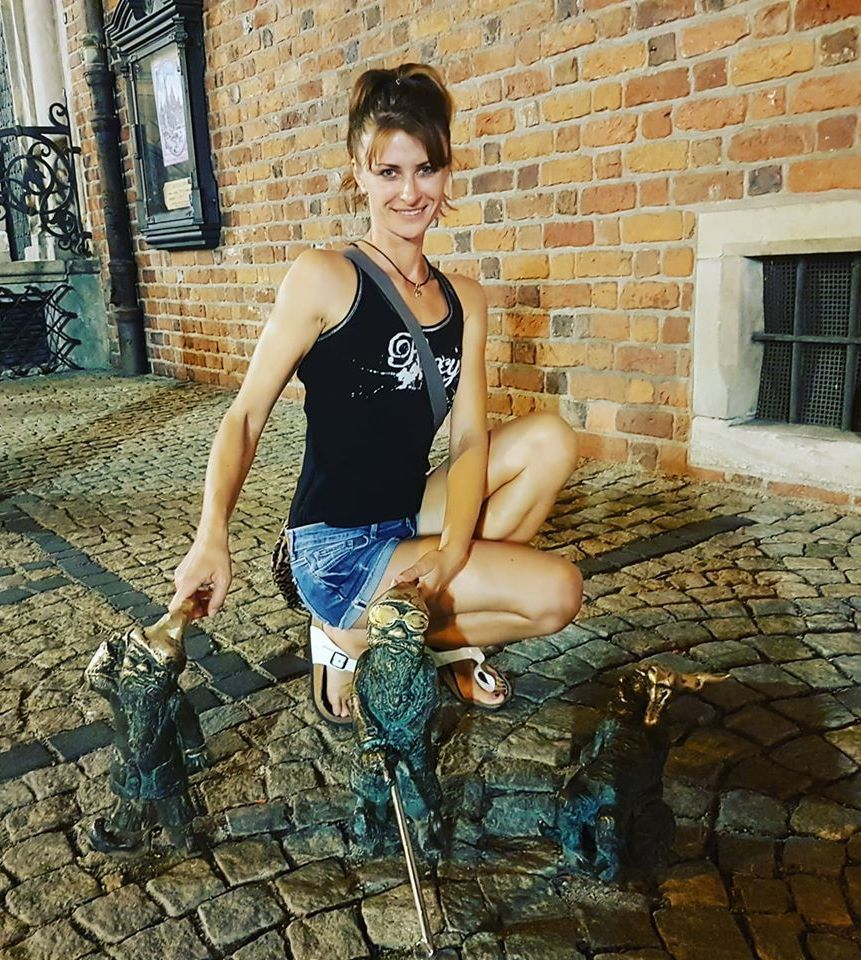

Personal information
- Born: 30 January 1981 (age 45) Kiev, Ukrainian SSR, Soviet Union
- Height: 1.76 m (5 ft 9 1/2 in)
- Weight: 63 kg (139 lb)

Sport
- Country: Georgia
- Sport: Track and field
- Event: High jump
- Updated on 29 August 2015

Valentina Liashenko (born 30 January 1981) is a female high jumper from Georgia.

She competed in the Women's high jump event at the 2015 World Championships in Athletics in Beijing, China.

== Competition record ==
Year	Competition	Venue	Position	Event	Notes
Representing Georgia
2015	World Championships	Beijing, China	–	High jump	NM
2016	Championships of the Small States of Europe	Marsa, Malta	1st	High jump	1.90 m
2016	European Championships	Amsterdam, Netherlands	23rd (q)	High jump	1.80 m
2016	Olympic Games	Rio de Janeiro, Brazil	32nd (q)	High jump	1.80 m
