= 2014 IAAF World Indoor Championships – Women's high jump =

The women's High Jump at the 2014 IAAF World Indoor Championships took place on 7–8 March 2014.

== Medalists ==
Gold		Bronze
Mariya Kuchina; Russia	Kamila Lićwinko; Poland	Ruth Beitia; Spain

== Records ==
Standing records prior to the 2014 IAAF World Indoor Championships
World record	Kajsa Bergqvist (SWE)	2.08	Arnstadt, Germany	4 February 2006
Championship record	Stefka Kostadinova (BUL)	2.05	Indianapolis, United States	8 March 1987
World Leading	Maria Kuchina (RUS)	2.01	Stockholm, Sweden	6 February 2014
African record	Hestrie Cloete (RSA)	1.97	Birmingham, Great Britain	18 February 2001
Asian record	Svetlana Zalevskaya (KAZ)	1.98	Samara, Russia	2 March 1996
European record	Kajsa Bergqvist (SWE)	2.08	Arnstadt, Germany	4 February 2006
North and Central American and Caribbean record	Chaunté Lowe (USA)	2.02	Albuquerque, United States	26 February 2012
Oceanian Record	Alison Inverarity (AUS)	1.97	Toronto, Canada	13 March 1993
South American record	Solange Witteveen (ARG)	1.94	Brno, Czech Republic	9 February 2000

== Qualification standards ==
Indoor	Outdoor
1.94

== Schedule ==
Date	Time	Round
7 March 2012	10:00	Qualification
8 March 2012	19:15	Final

== Results ==
=== Qualification ===
Qualification: 1.95 (Q) or at least 8 best performers (q) qualified for the final.

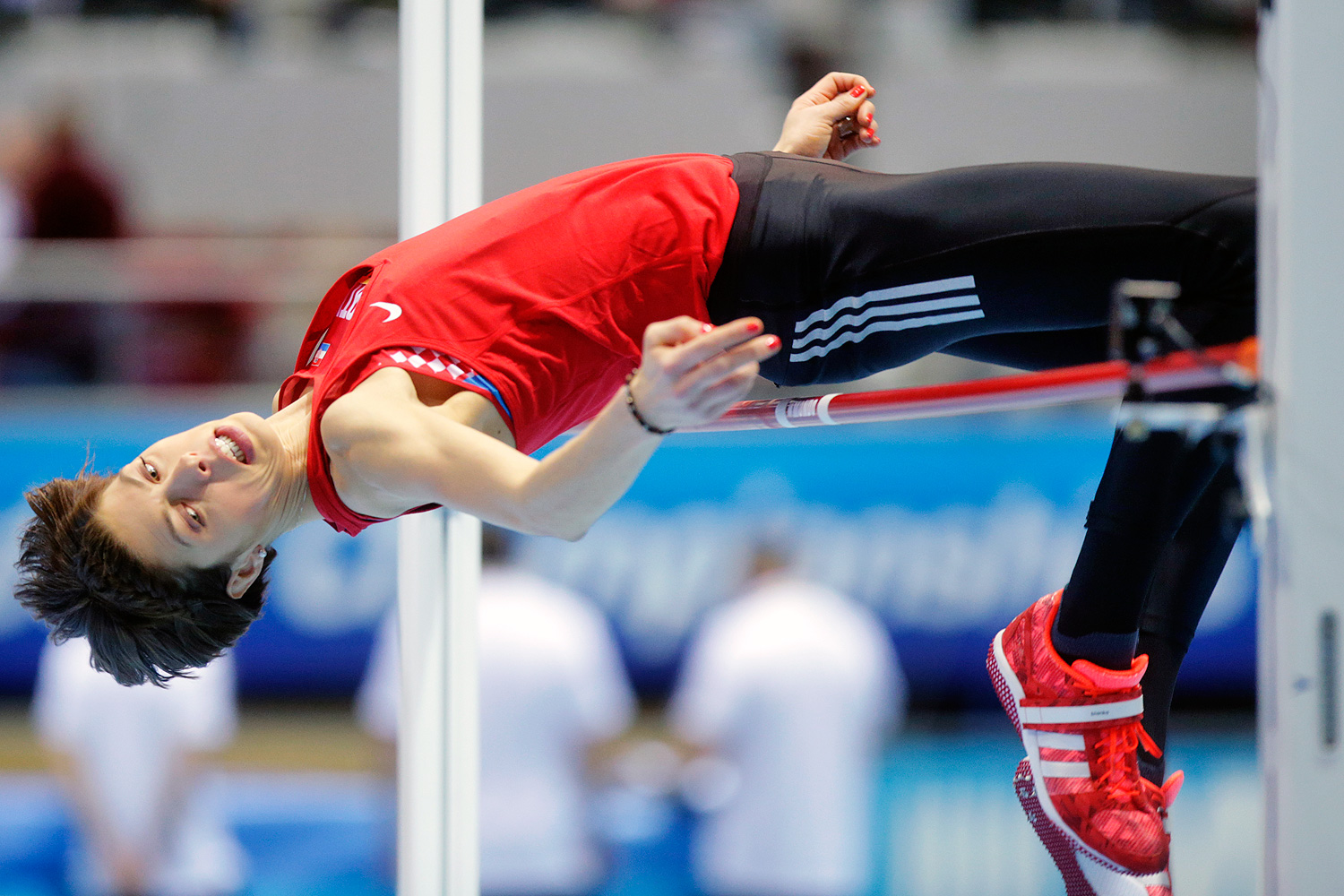
Blanka Vlašić made a comeback after a lengthy injury, finishing sixth in the final.

Rank	Athlete	Nationality	1.79	1.84	1.88	1.92	1.95	Result	Notes
1	Ruth Beitia	Spain	–	o	o	o	o	1.95	Q
2	Mariya Kuchina	Russia	o	o	o	xo	o	1.95	Q
3	Marie-Laurence Jungfleisch	Germany	xo	o	o	xo	o	1.95	Q
4	Levern Spencer	Saint Lucia	–	o	o	o	xo	1.95	Q, iNR
4	Kamila Lićwinko	Poland	o	o	o	o	xo	1.95	Q
6	Justyna Kasprzycka	Poland	o	o	o	xo	xo	1.95	Q, PB
7	Emma Green Tregaro	Sweden	–	–	o	o	xxo	1.95	Q
8	Blanka Vlašić	Croatia	–	o	–	o	xxx	1.92	q
8	Nafissatou Thiam	Belgium	o	o	o	o	xxx	1.92	q
10	Iryna Herashchenko	Ukraine	o	o	o	xo	xxx	1.92	
10	Airinė Palšytė	Lithuania	–	o	o	xo	xxx	1.92	
12	Inika McPherson	United States	–	–	xo	xo	xxx	1.92	
13	Irina Gordeeva	Russia	o	o	o	xxo	xxx	1.92	
14	Svetlana Radzivil	Uzbekistan	o	o	o	xxx		1.88	
15	Anna Iljuštšenko	Estonia	o	o	xxo	xxx		1.88	
16	Ana Šimić	Croatia	xo	o	xxo	xxx		1.88	
17	Nadiya Dusanova	Uzbekistan	o	o	xxx			1.84	

=== Final ===
Rank	Athlete	Nationality	1.85	1.90	1.94	1.97	2.00	2.02	Result	Notes
1st place, gold medalist(s)	Mariya Kuchina	Russia	o	o	o	xo	o	xxx	2.00	
1st place, gold medalist(s)	Kamila Lićwinko	Poland	o	o	o	xo	o	xxx	2.00	=NR
3rd place, bronze medalist(s)	Ruth Beitia	Spain	o	o	o	o	xo	xxx	2.00	SB
4	Justyna Kasprzycka	Poland	o	o	o	o	xxx		1.97	PB
5	Emma Green Tregaro	Sweden	o	o	o	xxx			1.94	
6	Blanka Vlašić	Croatia	o	xo	o	xxx			1.94	
7	Levern Spencer	Saint Lucia	o	xxo	xo	xxx			1.94	
8	Nafissatou Thiam	Belgium	o	o	xxx				1.90	
8	Marie-Laurence Jungfleisch	Germany	o	o	xxx				1.90	
