= Alessia Trost =

Italian high jumper

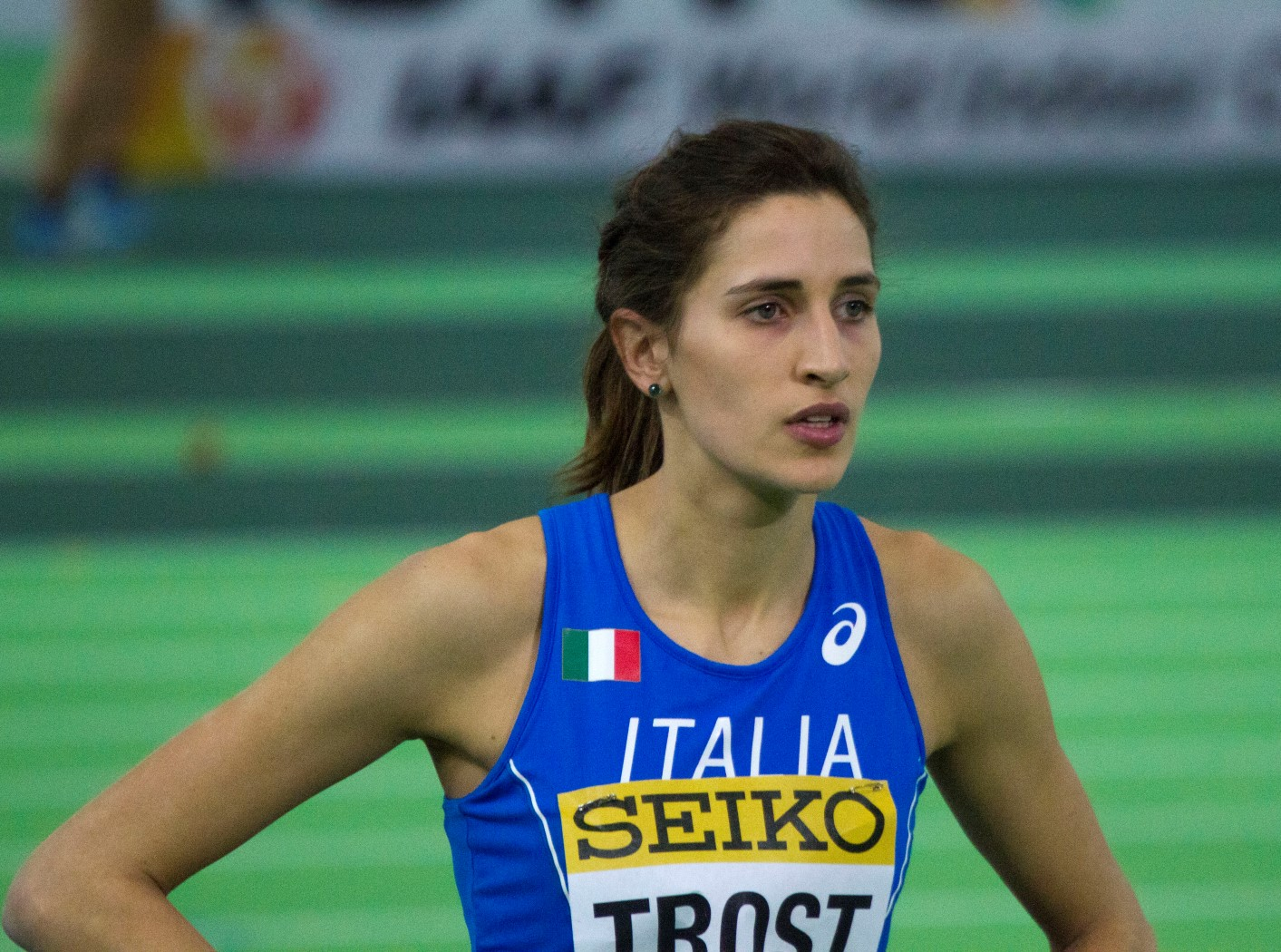
- Trost at 2016 IAAF World Indoor Championships

Personal information
- Nationality: Italian
- Born: 8 March 1993 (age 33) Pordenone, Italy
- Height: 1.89 m (6 ft 2 in)
- Weight: 68 kg (150 lb)

Sport
- Country: Italy
- Sport: Athletics
- Event: High jump
- Club: G.S. Fiamme Gialle
- Coached by: Gianfranco Chessa

Achievements and titles
- Personal bests: H. jump indoor: 2.00 m (2013); H. jump outdoor: 1.98 m (2013)
Medal record
International podiums
Event	1st	2nd	3rd
World Indoor Championships	0	0	1
European Indoor Championships	0	1	0
European U23 Championships	2	0	0
European Team Championships	0	2	2
Total	2	3	3
World Indoor Championships
Bronze medal – third place	2018 Birmingham	High jump
European Indoor Championships
Silver medal – second place	2015 Prague	High jump
European Team Championships
Silver medal – second place	2013 Gateshead	High jump
Silver medal – second place	2021 Silesia	High jump
Bronze medal – third place	2017 Lille	High jump
Bronze medal – third place	2019 Bydgoszcz	High jump
World Junior Championships
Gold medal – first place	2012 Barcelona	High jump
World Youth Championships
Gold medal – first place	2009 Brixen	High jump

Alessia Trost (born 8 March 1993) is an Italian female high jumper. She competed at the 2020 Summer Olympics, in High jump.

She won the 2009 World Youth Championship in Athletics in Bressanone. She was the bronze medallist at the 2018 IAAF World Indoor Championships.

== Biography ==
Trost also won the Italian Youth Championship in 2008. At the first Youth Olympics 2010 she won a silver medal clearing 1.86 metres, to finish second behind Russia′s Mariya Kuchina.

On 20 January 2013 she set her personal best, third Italian best measure of all-time (after two female Italian champions, Antonietta Di Martino 2.04 m and Sara Simeoni 2.01 m), with 1.98 m in Udine, Italy. Nine days later she became the third Italian woman to jump 2.00m, and 2013 World Leader. On 26 February 2012 she won the title of the European Athletic Association, European Athletes of the Month for January.

In August, at her first appearance at the World Championships in 2013, Trost jumped 1.93 m in the high jump final without making errors, but then failed to jump 1.97 m and finished 7th.

== Achievements ==
Year	Competition	Venue	Position	Notes
2009	World Youth Championships	Brixen, Italy	1st	1.87 m PB
2009	European Youth Olympic Festival	Tampere, Finland	1st	1.85 m
2010	Youth Olympic Games	Singapore	2nd	1.86 m
2011	European Junior Championships	Tallinn, Estonia	4th	1.85 m
2012	World Junior Championships	Barcelona, Spain	1st	1.91 m
2013	European Indoor Championships	Gothenburg, Sweden	4th	1.92 m
2013	European Team Championships	Gateshead, United Kingdom	2nd	1.92 m
2013	European U23 Championships	Tampere, Finland	1st	1.98 m CR
2013	World Championships	Moscow, Russia	7th	1.93 m
2015	European Indoor Championships	Prague, Czech Republic	2nd	1.97 m
2015	European U23 Championships	Tallinn, Estonia	1st	1.90 m
2016	World Indoor Championships	Portland, United States	7th	1.93 m
2016	European Championships	Amsterdam, Netherlands	5th	1.89 m
2016	Olympic Games	Rio de Janeiro, Brazil	5th	1.93 m
2017	European Team Championships	Lille, France	3rd	1.94 m
2017	World Championships	London, United Kingdom	Qual.	1.89 m
2018	World Indoor Championships	Birmingham, United Kingdom	3rd	1.93 m SB
2018	European Championships	Berlin, Germany	8th	1.91 m
2019	European Indoor Championships	Glasgow, United Kingdom	18th (q)	1.85 m
2019	World Championships	Doha, Qatar	14th (q)	1.92 m
2021	European Indoor Championships	Toruń, Poland	6th	1.92 m
2021	Olympic Games	Tokyo, Japan	20th (q)	1.90 m

== National titles ==
Trost won nine national championships at individual senior level.

- Italian Athletics Championships
  - High jump: 2013, 2014, 2016, 2019 (4)
- Italian Athletics Indoor Championships
  - High jump: 2013, 2014, 2016, 2018, 2021 (5)

== See also ==
- Female two metres club
- Italian all-time top lists - High jump
