= Mirela Demireva =

Bulgarian high jumper

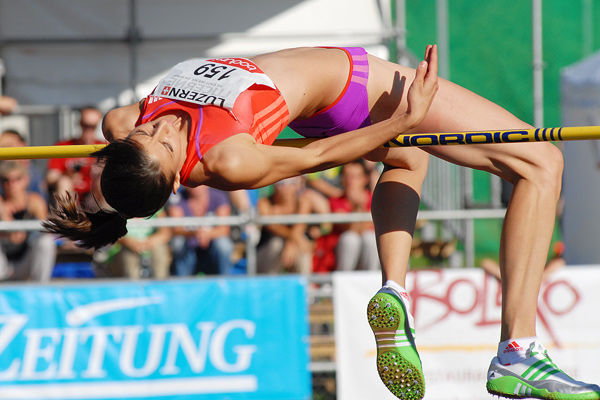
- Demireva in 2012

Personal information
- Full name: Mirela Krasimirova Demireva
- Nationality: Bulgarian
- Born: 28 September 1989 (age 37) Sofia, Bulgaria
- Height: 180 cm (5 ft 11 in)
- Weight: 58 kg (128 lb)

Sport
- Country: Bulgaria
- Sport: Track and field
- Event: High jump
- Club: Atletik Sf
- Coached by: Liliana Videva (2004–2014); Rini van Leeuwen (2014–)

Achievements and titles
- Personal bests: High jump: Outdoor: 2.00 m; Indoor: 1.95 m
Medal record
Event	1st	2nd	3rd
European Championships	0	2	0
Olympic Games	0	1	0
Total	0	3	0
Women's Athletics
Representing Bulgaria
Olympic Games
Silver medal – second place	2016 Rio de Janeiro	High Jump
European Championships
Silver medal – second place	2016 Amsterdam	High jump
Silver medal – second place	2018 Berlin	High jump

Mirela Krasimirova Demireva (Bulgarian: Мирела Красимирова Демирева; born 28 September 1989) is a Bulgarian high jumper.

== Career ==
Demireva did not reach the final at the 2006 World Junior Championships, but won the silver medal at the 2008 World Junior Championships. She was again knocked out in the first round at the 2011 European U23 Championships.

At the senior level she finished eighth at the 2012 European Championships and seventh at the 2013 European Indoor Championships. She also competed at the 2013 World Championships without reaching the final.

At the Olympic Games in Rio de Janeiro 2016 Demireva won a silver medal, jumping 1.97 m. She also won two consecutive silver medals at the European Championships (2016–18). Demireva was the 2016 Bulgarian Sportsperson of the Year and came in second place during the 2018 edition of the award.

Her personal best jump is 2.00 m (6 ft 6 1/2 in), achieved in June 2018 at the Diamond League meeting in Stockholm.

== Achievements ==
Year	Competition	Venue	Position	Notes
Representing Bulgaria
2006	World Junior Championships	Beijing, China	16th (q)	1.78 m
2007	European Junior Championships	Hengelo, Netherlands	3rd	1.82 m
2008	World Junior Championships	Bydgoszcz, Poland	2nd	1.86 m
2009	European U23 Championships	Kaunas, Lithuania	7th	1.83 m
2011	European U23 Championships	Ostrava, Czech Republic	17th (q)	1.80 m
2012	European Championships	Helsinki, Finland	8th	1.92 m
2013	European Indoor Championships	Gothenburg, Sweden	7th	1.87 m
2015	World Championships	Beijing, China	9th	1.88 m
2016	European Championships	Amsterdam, Netherlands	2nd	1.96 m
2016	Olympic Games	Rio de Janeiro, Brazil	2nd	1.97 m
2017	World Championships	London, United Kingdom	7th	1.92 m
2018	World Indoor Championships	Birmingham, United Kingdom	6th	1.89 m
2018	European Championships	Berlin, Germany	2nd	2.00 m
2019	World Championships	Doha, Qatar	10th	1.89 m
2021	Olympic Games	Tokyo, Japan	12th	1.93 m
2022	World Indoor Championships	Belgrade, Serbia	8th	1.88 m
2022	European Championships	Munich, Germany	9th	1.86 m
2024	Balkan Championships	İzmir, Turkey	2nd	1.86 m
2024	European Championships	Rome, Italy	4th	1.93 m
2024	Olympic Games	Paris, France	19th (q)	1.88 m

Sporting positions
Preceded by (Bulgaria) Maria Nikolova	Women's Bulgarian National Champion; 2007–2008	Succeeded by (Bulgaria) Venelina Veneva-Mateeva
Preceded by (Bulgaria) Venelina Veneva-Mateeva	Women's Bulgarian National Champion; 2011	Succeeded by (Bulgaria) Gergana Mincheva
Preceded by (Bulgaria) Gergana Mincheva	Women's Bulgarian National Champion; 2013–2014	Succeeded by (Bulgaria) Galina Nikolova
