= Maayan Furman-Shahaf =

Israeli athlete

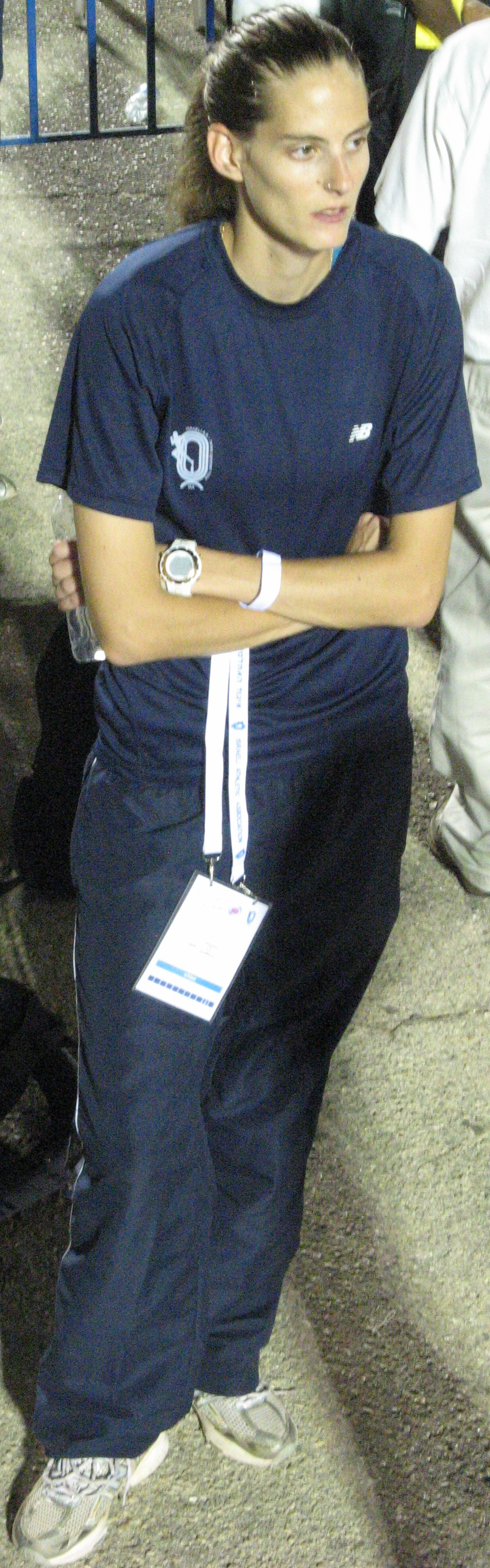
- Furman-Shahaf at the 2011 Israeli Championships

Personal information
- Native name: מעין פורמן-שחף
- Nationality: Israeli
- Born: November 9, 1986 (age 39)

Sport
- Sport: Track & field
- Event(s): High jump; Triple jump

Achievements and titles
- National finals: Israeli Athletics Championships in high jump: 2007, 2009, 2012, 2013, 2014, 2015, 2016

Maayan Furman-Shahaf (Hebrew: מעין פורמן-שחף; born November 9, 1986) is an Israeli high jumper and triple jumper. She holds a personal best of 1.92 m (6 ft 3 1/2 in) for the high jump and 12.52 m (41 ft 3/4 in) for the triple jump.

She competed for Israel at the 2013 World Championships in Athletics in the women's high jump, coming in fifth at 1.88 m. She represented her country at the European Athletics Championships in 2012 and 2016.

== National titles ==
- Israeli Athletics Championships
  - High jump: 2007, 2009, 2012, 2013, 2014, 2015, 2016
