= Linda Sandblom =

Finnish high jumper

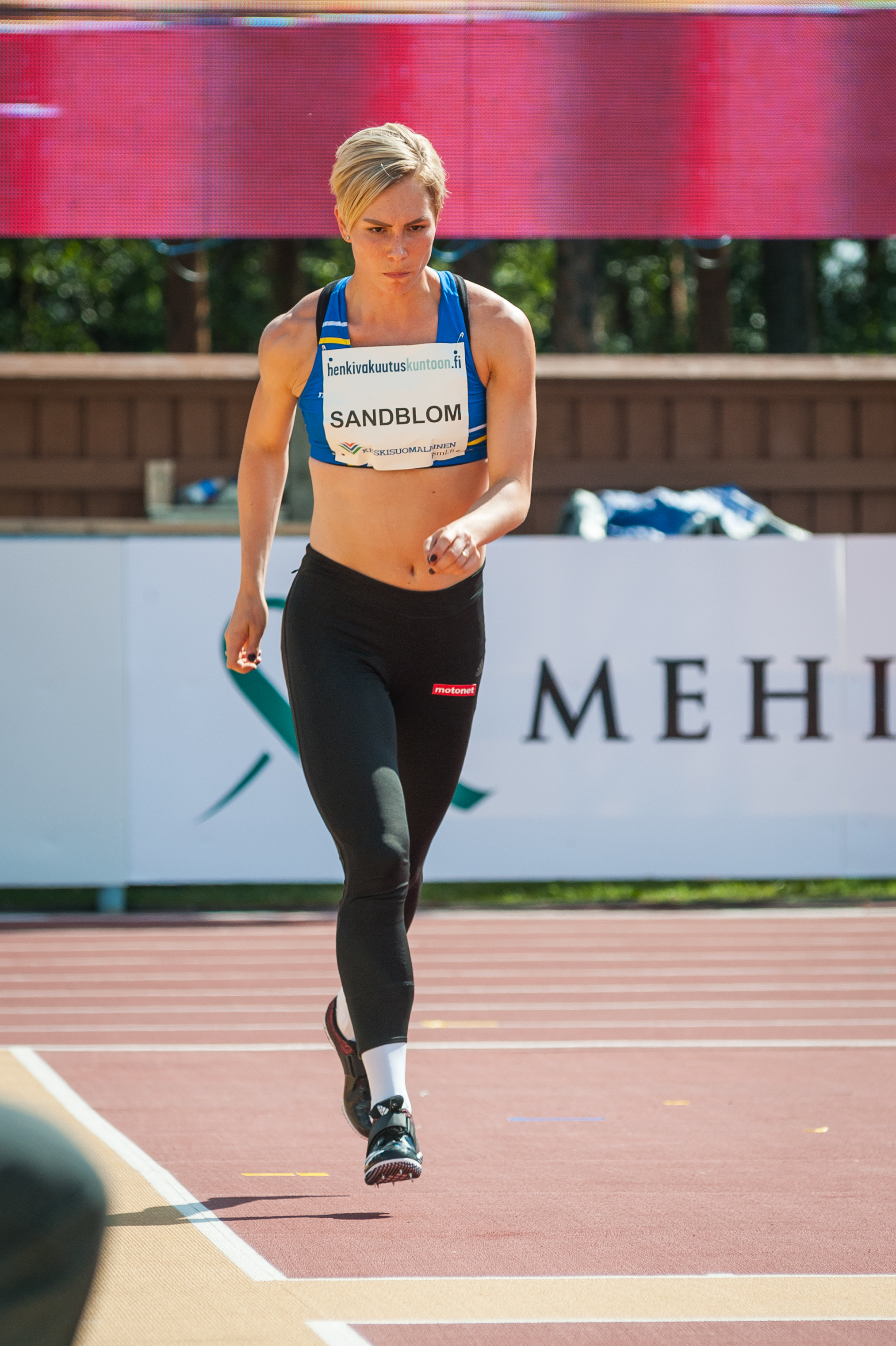
- Sandblom in 2018

Personal information
- Born: October 18, 1989 (age 36)
- Height: 1.76 m (5 ft 9 1/2 in)
- Weight: 62 kg (137 lb)

Sport
- Country: Finland
- Sport: Athletics
- Event: High jump

Linda Maria Sandblom (born 18 October 1989, Hanko) is a Finnish high jumper, who represents HIK Friidrott Hanko. Until 2013 she represented Hangö IK. She is coached by Matti Nieminen and Leif Sandblom.

At the Finnish Indoor Championships Sandblom has won gold in 2016, silver in 2009 and 2014 and bronze in 2013.

Sandblom set a new Finnish record, 193 cm, on 25 June 2016 in Kuortane at the Elite Games. Her indoor record is 185 cm which she jumped in Jyväskylä on 17 February 2013. She competed at the 2016 Summer Olympics finishing in 26th place. Sandblom's outdoor record of 193 cm was broken by Ella Junnila twice in 2019, first on 11 June 2019 at the Paavo Nurmi Games when Junnila jumped 194 cm and in July 2019 at a competition in Tampere when Junnila jumped 195 cm.
