= 1992 World Junior Championships in Athletics – Women's high jump =

The women's high jump event at the 1992 World Junior Championships in Athletics was held in Seoul, South Korea, at Olympic Stadium on 17 and 19 September.

== Medalists ==
Gold	Manuela Aigner; Germany
Silver	Ina Gliznuța; Commonwealth of Independent States
Silver	Svetlana Zalevskaya; Commonwealth of Independent States

== Results ==
=== Final ===
19 September

Rank	Name	Nationality	Result	Notes
1st place, gold medalist(s)	Manuela Aigner	Germany	1.93	
2nd place, silver medalist(s)	Ina Gliznuța	Commonwealth of Independent States	1.88	
2nd place, silver medalist(s)	Svetlana Zalevskaya	Commonwealth of Independent States	1.88	
4	Katja Kilpi	Finland	1.88	
5	Desislava Aleksandrova	Bulgaria	1.85	
5	Yoko Ota	Japan	1.85	
7	Andrea Hughes	Australia	1.85	
8	Eleonora Milusheva	Bulgaria	1.85	
9	Amy Acuff	United States	1.85	
10	Sabrina De Leeuw	Belgium	1.81	
10	Maja Fehrig	Germany	1.81	
12	Zuzana Kováčiková	Czechoslovakia	1.81	
13	Monika Gollner	Austria	1.81	
13	Stefania Lovison	Italy	1.81	
15	Melissa Harris	Australia	1.77	
15	Zhang Liwen	China	1.77	
15	Maria Gruffman-Rönnlund	Sweden	1.77	
18	Els Belien	Belgium	1.77	

=== Qualifications ===
17 Sep

==== Group A ====
Rank	Name	Nationality	Result	Notes
1	Andrea Hughes	Australia	1.84	Q
2	Desislava Aleksandrova	Bulgaria	1.84	Q
3	Katja Kilpi	Finland	1.84	Q
4	Svetlana Zalevskaya	Commonwealth of Independent States	1.84	Q
5	Monika Gollner	Austria	1.84	Q
6	Manuela Aigner	Germany	1.80	q
6	Yoko Ota	Japan	1.80	q
8	Zhang Liwen	China	1.80	q
9	Sabrina De Leeuw	Belgium	1.80	q
9	Maria Gruffman-Rönnlund	Sweden	1.80	q
11	Wanita Dykstra	Canada	1.75	
12	Orla Venter	Namibia	1.70	

==== Group B ====
Rank	Name	Nationality	Result	Notes
1	Ina Gliznuța	Commonwealth of Independent States	1.84	Q
2	Maja Fehrig	Germany	1.80	q
3	Zuzana Kováčiková	Czechoslovakia	1.80	q
3	Amy Acuff	United States	1.80	q
5	Eleonora Milusheva	Bulgaria	1.80	q
6	Els Belien	Belgium	1.80	q
7	Melissa Harris	Australia	1.80	q
7	Stefania Lovison	Italy	1.80	q
9	Nathalie Belfort	Canada	1.75	
10	Lin Su-Chi	Chinese Taipei	1.75	
	Irena Tosic	Bosnia and Herzegovina	NH	
	Kim Brown	New Zealand	NH	

== Participation ==
According to an unofficial count, 24 athletes from 18 countries participated in the event.

- Australia (2)
- Austria (1)
- Belgium (2)
- Bosnia and Herzegovina (1)
- Bulgaria (2)
- Canada (2)
- China (1)
- Chinese Taipei (1)
- Commonwealth of Independent States (2)
- Czechoslovakia (1)
- Finland (1)
- Germany (2)
- Italy (1)
- Japan (1)
- Namibia (1)
- New Zealand (1)
- Sweden (1)
- United States (1)
