= 2008 IAAF World Indoor Championships – Women's high jump =

== Medalists ==
Gold
Blanka Vlašić	Croatia
Silver
Elena Slesarenko	Russia
Bronze
Vita Palamar	Ukraine

== Qualification ==
Qualification rule: qualification standard 1.96m or at least best 8 qualified

Pos	Athlete	Country	Mark	Q	Attempts					
Pos	Athlete	Country	Mark	Q	1.76	1.81	1.86	1.90	1.93	1.96
1	Ruth Beitia	Spain	1.96	Q	-	O	O	O	O	O
1	Marina Aitova	Kazakhstan	1.96 PB	Q	-	O	O	O	O	O
3	Blanka Vlašić	Croatia	1.96	Q	-	-	O	-	XO	O
3	Elena Slesarenko	Russia	1.96	Q	-	O	O	O	XO	O
3	Ariane Friedrich	Germany	1.96	Q	-	O	O	O	XO	O
6	Vita Palamar	Ukraine	1.96	Q	-	-	O	O	XO	XXO
7	Iva Straková	Czech Republic	1.93	q	XO	XO	XO	XXO	O	XXX
8	Amy Acuff	United States	1.93	q	-	O	O	O	XO	XXX
8	Ekaterina Savchenko	Russia	1.93	q	-	O	O	O	XO	XXX
10	Antonietta Di Martino	Italy	1.93		-	XO	O	O	XO	XXX
11	Xingjuan Zheng	China	1.90		O	O	XO	O	XXX	
12	Romary Rifka	Mexico	1.90 NR		O	O	XXO	XO	XXX	
13	Yekaterina Yevseyeva	Kazakhstan	1.86		-	O	O	XXX		
13	Emma Green	Sweden	1.86		-	-	O	XXX		
15	Nicole Forrester	Canada	1.86		-	O	XO	XXX		
16	Barbora Laláková	Czech Republic	1.81		O	O	XXX			
17	Tatyana Efimenko	Kyrgyzstan	1.81		-	XO	XXX			
	Tia Hellebaut	Belgium	DNS							

== Final ==
Pos	Athlete	Country	Mark	Attempts									
Pos	Athlete	Country	Mark	1.84	1.88	1.91	1.93	1.95	1.97	1.99	2.01	2.03	2.09
Gold medal	Blanka Vlašić	Croatia	2.03	O	-	O	-	O	-	O	O	XO	XXX
Silver medal	Elena Slesarenko	Russia	2.01	O	O	O	XO	XO	O	O	O	XXX	
Bronze medal	Vita Palamar	Ukraine	2.01 NR	-	O	XXO	O	O	O	XXO	XXO	XXX	
4	Ruth Beitia	Spain	1.99 SB	O	O	O	O	O	O	O	XXX		
5	Marina Aitova	Kazakhstan	1.95	O	O	O	O	XO	XXX				
6	Amy Acuff	United States	1.95 SB	O	-	XO	-	XXO	-	X-	XX		
7	Ekaterina Savchenko	Russia	1.93	O	O	O	O	XXX					
8	Iva Straková	Czech Republic	1.93	O	O	XXO	XO	XXX					
8	Ariane Friedrich	Germany	1.93	O	O	XXO	XO	XXX					
