= 2006 IAAF World Indoor Championships – Women's high jump =

The Women's high jump event at the 2006 IAAF World Indoor Championships was held on March 11–12.

== Medalists ==
Gold	Silver	Bronze
Elena Slesarenko; Russia	Blanka Vlašić; Croatia	Ruth Beitia; Spain

== Results ==
=== Qualification ===
Qualification: Qualification Performance 1.96 (Q) or at least 8 best performers (q) advanced to the final.

Rank	Athlete	Nationality	1.81	1.86	1.90	1.93	1.96	Result	Notes
1.	Blanka Vlašić	Croatia	–	o	xo	o	o	1.96	Q
2.	Tia Hellebaut	Belgium	o	o	xxo	o	o	1.96	Q
3.	Ruth Beitia	Spain	o	o	o	o	xo	1.96	Q
4.	Elena Slesarenko	Russia	o	o	o	xo	xo	1.96	Q
5.	Vita Styopina	Ukraine	o	o	o	o	xxo	1.96	Q
5.	Ekaterina Savchenko	Russia	o	o	o	o	xxo	1.96	Q, SB
7.	Antonietta Di Martino	Italy	o	o	xo	o	xxx	1.93	q, SB
8.	Chaunté Howard	United States	o	xxo	o	o	xxx	1.93	q
9.	Marta Mendía	Spain	o	xo	xo	xo	xxx	1.93	SB
10.	Iva Straková	Czech Republic	o	o	o	xxo	xxx	1.93	
11.	Barbora Laláková	Czech Republic	o	o	o	xxx		1.90	
11.	Dóra Győrffy	Hungary	o	o	o	xxx		1.90	
13.	Amy Acuff	United States	o	–	xo	xxx		1.90	
14.	Emma Green	Sweden	o	o	xxo	xxx		1.90	
15.	Iryna Kovalenko	Ukraine	o	xo	xxx			1.86	
16.	Tatyana Efimenko	Kyrgyzstan	o	xxo	xxx			1.86	
17.	Caterine Ibargüen	Colombia	xxo	x–				1.81	NR

=== Final ===
Rank	Athlete	Nationality	1.84	1.88	1.91	1.94	1.96	1.98	2.00	2.02	2.04	Result	Notes
1st place, gold medalist(s)	Elena Slesarenko	Russia	o	o	o	o	o	o	xxo	o	xx	2.02	SB
2nd place, silver medalist(s)	Blanka Vlašić	Croatia	o	–	o	–	o	o	xo	x–	xx	2.00	
3rd place, bronze medalist(s)	Ruth Beitia	Spain	o	o	o	o	o	o	xxx			1.98	SB
4	Ekaterina Savchenko	Russia	o	o	o	o	o	xxo	xxx			1.98	PB
5	Antonietta Di Martino	Italy	o	o	xo	o	o	xxx				1.96	PB
6	Tia Hellebaut	Belgium	o	o	o	o	xo	xxx				1.96	
7	Vita Styopina	Ukraine	xo	o	xo	o	xxo	xxx				1.96	
8	Chaunté Howard	United States	o	o	o	o	xxx					1.94	
