= Internationales Hochsprung-Meeting Eberstadt =

- Official competition logo
- Date: June–September in
- Location: Eberstadt, Germany
- Event type: High jump
- Established: 1979
- Last held: 2018
- Website: Official website

The Internationales Hochsprung-Meeting was an annual high jumping competition which took place in Eberstadt, Germany. Established as a men's competition in 1979, it quickly became an important meeting in the high jump calendar, with Jacek Wszoła setting a world record in 1980, and Zhu Jianhua improving the record further in 1984. A women's contest was added to the programme in 2002.

World record holder Javier Sotomayor was the competition's most successful athlete, with a total of five wins achieved over seven years. Vyacheslav Voronin's and Stefan Holm's winning jumps in 2001 and 2004, respectively, were the greatest jumps in the world that season. Kajsa Bergqvist's winning jump in 2003 was also a season's best, and remains among the highest jumps ever completed by a female athlete.

Ariane Friedrich became the first German woman to win in Eberstadt in 2010 and Raúl Spank also made it the first German clean sweep that year.

A total of two world records, four European records, one Asian record and seventeen national records were set at the competition.

The final edition of the Internationales Hochsprung-Meeting took place in 2018.

== Winners ==
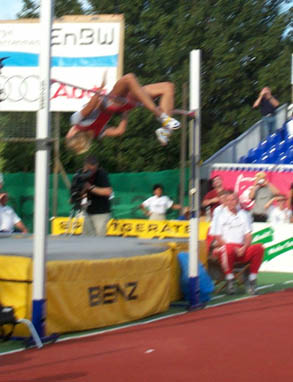
Kajsa Bergqvist competing in Eberstadt in 2003

Key: Meeting record

Winners of the Internationales Hochsprung-Meeting Eberstadt
Year	Men's winner	Mark	Women's winner	Mark
1979	Dietmar Mögenburg (FRG)	2.30	—	—
1980	Jacek Wszoła (POL)	2.35	—	—
1981	Roland Dalhäuser (SWI)	2.31	—	—
1982	Roland Dalhäuser (SWI)	2.30	—	—
1983	Gerd Nagel (FRG)	2.27	—	—
1984	Zhu Jianhua (CHN)	2.39	—	—
1985	Patrick Sjöberg (SWE)	2.38	—	—
1986	Milton Ottey (CAN)	2.30	—	—
1987	Patrick Sjöberg (SWE)	2.36	—	—
1988	Carlo Thränhardt (FRG)	2.34	—	—
1989	Carlo Thränhardt (FRG)	2.34	—	—
1990	Sorin Matei (ROU)	2.36	—	—
1991	Javier Sotomayor (CUB)	2.36	—	—
1992	Javier Sotomayor (CUB)	2.36	—	—
1993	Hollis Conway (USA)	2.38	—	—
1994	Javier Sotomayor (CUB)	2.40	—	—
1995	Javier Sotomayor (CUB)	2.37	—	—
1996	Artur Partyka (POL)	2.38	—	—
1997	Javier Sotomayor (CUB)	2.35	—	—
1998	Artur Partyka (POL)	2.33	—	—
1999	Mark Boswell (CAN)	2.33	—	—
2000	Vyacheslav Voronin (RUS)	2.36	—	—
2001	Vyacheslav Voronin (RUS)	2.37	—	—
2002	Mark Boswell (CAN)	2.33	Iryna Mykhalchenko (UKR)	2.00
2003	Jacques Freitag (RSA)	2.30	Kajsa Bergqvist (SWE)	2.06
2004	Stefan Holm (SWE)	2.36	Iryna Mykhalchenko (UKR)	2.01
2005	Vyacheslav Voronin (RUS)	2.33	Iryna Mykhalchenko (UKR)	1.91
2006	Tomás Janku (CZE)	2.30	Kajsa Bergqvist (SWE)	1.98
2007	Andrey Silnov (RUS)	2.30	Yekaterina Savchenko (RUS)	1.97
2008	Víctor Moya (CUB); Martyn Bernard (GBR)	2.30	Yelena Slesarenko (RUS)	2.02
2009	Raúl Spank (GER)	2.33	Irina Gordeyeva (RUS)	2.02
2010	Raúl Spank (GER)	2.30	Ariane Friedrich (GER)	2.00
2011	Ivan Ukhov (RUS)	2.24	Svetlana Shkolina (RUS)	1.99
2012	Mutaz Essa Barshim (QAT)	2.35	Irina Gordeyeva (RUS)	2.04
2013	Bohdan Bondarenko (UKR)	2.30	Svetlana Shkolina (RUS)	1.94
2014	Mutaz Essa Barshim (QAT)	2.41	Airinė Palšytė (LTU)	1.98
2015	Derek Drouin (CAN)	2.37	Marie-Laurence Jungfleisch (GER)	1.96
2016	Derek Drouin (CAN)	2.38	Marie-Laurence Jungfleisch (GER)	2.00
2017	Mutaz Essa Barshim (QAT)	2.40	Marie-Laurence Jungfleisch (GER)	2.00
2018	Brandon Starc (AUS)	2.36	Airiné Palsyté (LTU)	1.94

== See also ==
- Hochsprung mit Musik
