= 1994 World Junior Championships in Athletics – Women's high jump =

The women's high jump event at the 1994 World Junior Championships in Athletics was held in Lisbon, Portugal, at Estádio Universitário de Lisboa on 21 and 23 July.

== Medalists ==
Gold	Olga Kaliturina; Russia
Silver	Kajsa Bergqvist; Sweden
Bronze	Lenka Rihaková; Slovakia
Bronze	Amy Acuff; United States

== Results ==
=== Final ===
23 July

Rank	Name	Nationality	Result	Notes
1st place, gold medalist(s)	Olga Kaliturina	Russia	1.88	
2nd place, silver medalist(s)	Kajsa Bergqvist	Sweden	1.88	
3rd place, bronze medalist(s)	Lenka Rihaková	Slovakia	1.88	
3rd place, bronze medalist(s)	Amy Acuff	United States	1.88	
5	Helen Sanzenbacher	Germany	1.85	
6	Vita Styopina	Ukraine	1.85	
7	Amewu Mensah	Germany	1.80	
7	Dóra Győrffy	Hungary	1.80	
7	Yekaterina Aleksandrova	Russia	1.80	
7	Emelie Färdigh	Sweden	1.80	
11	Tatyana Nikolayeva	Ukraine	1.80	
12	Yoko Ota	Japan	1.80	

=== Qualifications ===
21 Jul

==== Group A ====
Rank	Name	Nationality	Result	Notes
1	Yekaterina Aleksandrova	Russia	1.83	Q
1	Vita Styopina	Ukraine	1.83	Q
1	Amy Acuff	United States	1.83	Q
4	Amewu Mensah	Germany	1.83	Q
5	Emelie Färdigh	Sweden	1.83	Q
6	Lin Su-Chi	Chinese Taipei	1.80	
7	Gülsün Durak	Turkey	1.80	
8	Judith van Gorp	Netherlands	1.75	
9	Marta Mendía	Spain	1.75	
10	Jane Millington	Australia	1.75	

==== Group B ====
Rank	Name	Nationality	Result	Notes
1	Olga Kaliturina	Russia	1.83	Q
1	Lenka Rihaková	Slovakia	1.83	Q
1	Tatyana Nikolayeva	Ukraine	1.83	Q
4	Helen Sanzenbacher	Germany	1.83	Q
4	Kajsa Bergqvist	Sweden	1.83	Q
6	Yoko Ota	Japan	1.83	Q
7	Dóra Győrffy	Hungary	1.83	Q
8	Lisa Bruty	Australia	1.80	
9	Luciane Dambacher	Brazil	1.80	
10	Tang Li-Wen	Chinese Taipei	1.75	
11	Orla Venter	Namibia	1.75	

== Participation ==
According to an unofficial count, 21 athletes from 15 countries participated in the event.

- Australia (2)
- Brazil (1)
- Chinese Taipei (2)
- Germany (2)
- Hungary (1)
- Japan (1)
- Namibia (1)
- Netherlands (1)
- Russia (2)
- Slovakia (1)
- Spain (1)
- Sweden (2)
- Turkey (1)
- Ukraine (2)
- United States (1)
