= Meike Kröger =

German high jumper

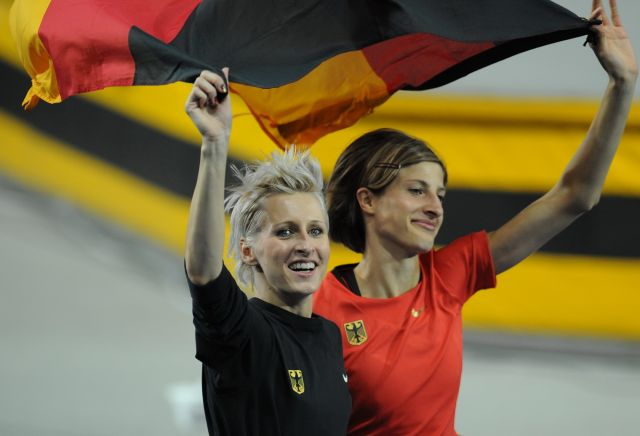
Meike Kröger (right) celebrating with Ariane Friedrich at the 2009 World Championships in Berlin.

Meike Kröger (born 21 July 1986) is a German track and field athlete who specialises in the high jump.

== Early career ==
She had her first success in the sport with wins at the German Junior Championships in both 2007 and 2008. In 2008, she also won the bronze medal at the German Championships. In the same year, she improved her personal best from 1.82 metres, achieved in May 2005 in Zeven, to 1.91 metres, achieved in July 2008 in Regensburg.

Her progress stalled in the years 2006 and also 2007 because she spent the period from September 2005 to August 2006 working in an orphanage in Bishkek, Kyrgyzstan. She did train with former high jumper Igor Paklin, albeit under sub-par material conditions.

== Breakthrough ==
She improved the following year, clearing 1.92 metres in two indoor meets (in January in Cottbus and February in Leipzig) and then 1.93 metres outdoor, in July in Ulm. She also began competing at an international senior level and took part in two major competitions: the 2009 European Athletics Indoor Championships, where she recorded a jump of 1.85 metres in the qualifiers, and 2009 World Championships in Athletics (which were held in her home city of Berlin). At the World Championships, she jumped close to a personal best in the qualifiers (1.92 m) and reached the high jump final. She did not improve on this, however, and finished in eleventh place having only cleared 1.87 m.

She started the 2009–2010 indoor season with rapid improvements, scoring a new best of 1.96 m indoors at the Hochsprung mit Musik meeting in Arnstadt. Kröger showed even greater progression at the German Indoor Championships: she cleared 1.98 m on her third attempt, increasing the pressure on the reigning champion Ariane Friedrich, and went further by jumping 2.00 m on her first attempt – seven centimeters higher than she had ever jumped just two months earlier. This was her second silver medal at the German Indoor Championships, having achieved the same placement in 2009. She competed at the 2010 World Indoor Championships without reaching the final.

She is coached by Jan-Gerrit Keil and represents the club LG Nord Berlin.

== Personal bests ==
Event	Best (m)	Venue	Date
High jump (outdoor)	1.93	Ulm, Germany	4 July 2009
High jump (indoor)	2.00	Karlsruhe, Germany	28 February 2010

- All information taken from IAAF profile.

== See also ==
- Female two metres club
