= 2006 European Athletics Championships – Women's high jump =

Women's high jump at the European Athletics Championships

The final of the Women's High Jump event at the 2006 European Athletics Championships in Gothenborg, Sweden was held on August 11, 2006. Belgium's Tia Hellebaut won the competition setting a new championship and a national record (2.03 metres). By winning Hellebaut gave Belgium its second gold medal at these championships after Kim Gevaert had already won the women's 100 metres event. Ten minutes after the high jump competition ended, Gevaert ran the final of the women's 200 metres and won a third gold medal for Belgium.

== Medalists ==
Gold	Silver	Bronze
Tia Hellebaut; Belgium	Venelina Veneva; Bulgaria	Kajsa Bergqvist; Sweden

== Schedule ==
Date	Time	Round
August 8, 2006	18:45	Qualification
August 11, 2006	18:30	Final

== Records ==
World Record	Stefka Kostadinova (BUL)	2.09 m	Rome, Italy	30 August 1989

== Results ==
=== Qualification ===
Qualification: Qualifying Performance 1.92 (Q) or at least 12 best performers (q) advance to the final.

Rank	Group	Name	Nationality	1.78	1.83	1.87	1.90	1.92	Result	Notes
1	A	Venelina Veneva	Bulgaria	-	o	o	o	o	1.92	Q
1	A	Blanka Vlašić	Croatia	-	-	o	o	o	1.92	Q
1	B	Kajsa Bergqvist	Sweden	-	-	o	o	o	1.92	Q
1	B	Iryna Mykhalchenko	Ukraine	o	o	o	o	o	1.92	Q
1	B	Yelena Slesarenko	Russia	o	o	o	o	o	1.92	Q
1	B	Tia Hellebaut	Belgium	-	o	o	o	o	1.92	Q
1	B	Anna Chicherova	Russia	-	o	o	o	o	1.92	Q
8	A	Ruth Beitia	Spain	o	o	o	xxo	o	1.92	Q
9	B	Deirdre Ryan	Ireland	o	o	xo	xxo	o	1.92	Q, NR
10	A	Yekaterina Savchenko	Russia	o	o	o	o	xxo	1.92	Q
10	A	Antonietta Di Martino	Italy	o	o	o	o	xxo	1.92	Q
12	A	Emma Green	Sweden	-	o	o	xo	xxo	1.92	Q, SB
13	B	Elena Meuti	Italy	o	o	xxo	xo	xxo	1.92	Q, PB
14	A	Romana Dubnová	Czech Republic	o	o	xxo	o	xxx	1.90	
15	B	Marta Mendía	Spain	o	o	xo	xxo	xxx	1.90	SB
16	A	Julia Hartmann	Germany	o	o	o	xxx		1.87	
16	B	Barbora Laláková	Czech Republic	o	o	o	xxx		1.87	
18	B	Dóra Győrffy	Hungary	o	xo	o	xxx		1.87	
19	A	Iryna Kovalenko	Ukraine	o	o	xo	xxx		1.87	
20	A	Anna Iljuštšenko	Estonia	o	o	xxo	xxx		1.87	
20	B	Inna Gliznuta	Moldova	o	o	xxo	xxx		1.87	
22	B	Iva Straková	Czech Republic	xo	xo	xxx			1.83	
23	A	María Papayeoryiou	Greece	o	xxo	xxx			1.83	
	A	Anne Gerd Eieland	Norway	xxx					NM	

=== Final ===
Rank	Name	Nationality	1.79	1.84	1.88	1.92	1.95	1.97	1.99	2.01	2.03	2.05	Result	Notes
1st place, gold medalist(s)	Tia Hellebaut	Belgium	-	o	o	o	o	o	o	xo	o	xx-	2.03	CR, NR, PB
2nd place, silver medalist(s)	Venelina Veneva	Bulgaria	-	o	o	o	xo	o	o	o	xo	xxx	2.03	CR
3rd place, bronze medalist(s)	Kajsa Bergqvist	Sweden	-	o	-	o	-	o	o	o	x-	xx	2.01	
4	Blanka Vlašić	Croatia	-	o	o	o	o	-	xo	o	xx-	x	2.01	
5	Yelena Slesarenko	Russia	-	o	o	o	o	o	xo	xxx			1.99	
6	Iryna Mykhalchenko	Ukraine	o	o	o	o	o	xxx					1.95	SB
7	Yekaterina Savchenko	Russia	o	o	o	o	xo	xxx					1.95	SB
7	Anna Chicherova	Russia	-	o	o	o	xo	xxx					1.95	SB
9	Ruth Beitia	Spain	o	o	o	o	xxx						1.92	
10	Antonietta Di Martino	Italy	xo	o	o	o	xxx						1.92	
11	Emma Green	Sweden	o	xo	xo	xxo	xxx						1.92	SB
12	Elena Meuti	Italy	o	xo	xo	xxx							1.88	
13	Deirdre Ryan	Ireland	o	xxo	xxx								1.84	
