= Hochsprung =

Hochsprung is German and literally means "high jump". It may refer to:

- High jump, a field event in athletics
- Internationales Hochsprung-Meeting Eberstadt, an international high jump competition in Eberstadt, Germany
- Hochsprung mit Musik, an international high jump competition in Arnstadt, Germany
- Dawn Hochsprung, the principal of the school involved in the Sandy Hook Elementary School shooting
