= Massimiliano Di Matteo =

Italian athletics coach

Personal information
- Nationality: Italian
- Born: April 28, 1978 (age 47) Cava de' Tirreni, Italy

Sport
- Country: Italy
- Sport: Athletics
- Event: High jump

Massimiliano Di Matteo (born 28 April 1978, in Cava de' Tirreni) is an Italian athletics coach.

== Biography ==
Married with Antonietta Di Martino on 29 September 2009, he became her coach from September 2009.

For Antonietta Di Martino the change of coach, from Davide Sessa to Massimiliano Di Matteo, in 2009 marked a resurgence in her form. She won the Italian Indoor Championships, but illness ruled her out of the 2009 European Indoor Championships a few months later. She took bronze at the 2009 European Team Championships and, soon after, she beat Blanka Vlašić to win the Golden Gala meeting, jumping 2.00 m in Rome. She cleared 1.99 m at the 2009 World Championships in Athletics, securing a fourth-place finish. She capped off the year with a bronze at the final edition of the World Athletics Final and married her new coach Di Matteo.

He is a lawyer in Cava de' Tirreni.

== See also ==
- Antonietta Di Martino
