= 2009 World Championships in Athletics – Women's high jump =

The women's high jump event at the 2009 World Championships in Berlin, Germany was held between 18 August and 20 August 2009.

Reigning champion Blanka Vlašić had spent the 2007 and 2008 seasons largely unbeaten, but high-profile losses in the Olympic high jump final and the 2008 IAAF Golden League final spelled the end for her lengthy winning streak. The rise of Germany's Ariane Friedrich in the 2009 season had seen her take the European Indoor title and make the world-leading jump of 2.06 m. Having beaten Vlašić in three of their five meetings that season, she was one of Germany's best prospects for a gold medal on home turf. Outside of the two top high jumpers, Antonietta Di Martino and Ruth Beitia had also performed well that season and 2004 Olympic gold medallist Yelena Slesarenko was another strong contender.

Vlašić had an unexpected setback before the qualifiers, suffering a deep gash in her head after hitting a doorway, but after receiving stitches she arrived at the stadium in time for the competition. All the expected finalists made their way through the qualification rounds. All but three of the twelve finalists managed the 1.95 m automatic qualifying mark, with Meike Kröger being a surprise second finalist for the host nation through her best non-qualifying mark of 1.92 m. Although the event was largely portrayed as a head-to-head between Vlašić and Friedrich, Russian Anna Chicherova proved to be a significant contender in the final.

Performing before a sold-out stadium, Di Martino and Beitia finished their competition with a best of 1.99 m, leaving Vlašić, Friedrich and Chicherova to compete for the medals. The Russian took the lead, managing 2.02 m on her first attempt, while the Croatian and the German needed two and three jumps, respectively. Vlašić was the first over 2.04 m and Chicherova recorded three fouls, unable to pass the height. Friedrich, who was in third place, twice failed the height and raised the bar to 2.06 m to try to take the gold medal position. Her final effort, although close, was not enough and she finished with the bronze. Vlašić then raised the bar to the world record of 2.10 m, but failed to jump the height.

Friedrich did not repeat the form which had seen her set a national record of 2.06 m at the Olympiastadion two months earlier, leaving Vlašić and Chicherova to repeat their gold and silver medal performances of the 2007 World Championships in Osaka. Vlašić, who became the first to win consecutive world titles in the event since Hestrie Cloete, said that she was surprised that 2.04 m had been enough for the gold medal and she expected to go much higher. Second-placed Chicherova said neither she, nor athletics commentators, had expected her to win the silver medal, but she had overcome prior injury concerns. Although gold had not materialised for Friedrich, she was happy with her bronze medal – her first at a World Championships.

== Medalists ==
Gold	Blanka Vlašić; Croatia (CRO)
Silver	Ariane Friedrich; Germany (GER)
Bronze	Antonietta Di Martino; Italy (ITA)

== Records ==
World record	Stefka Kostadinova (BUL)	2.09	Rome, Italy	30 August 1987
Championship record	Stefka Kostadinova (BUL)	2.09	Rome, Italy	30 August 1987
World Leading	Ariane Friedrich (GER)	2.06	Berlin, Germany	14 June 2009
African Record	Hestrie Cloete (RSA)	2.06	Paris, France	31 August 2003
Asian Record	Marina Aitova (KAZ)	1.99	Athens, Greece	13 July 2009
North American record	Silvia Costa (CUB)	2.04	Barcelona, Spain	9 September 1989
South American record	Solange Witteveen (ARG)	1.96	Oristano, Italy	8 September 1997
European Record	Stefka Kostadinova (BUL)	2.09	Rome, Italy	30 August 1987
Oceanian Record	Vanessa Browne-Ward (AUS)	1.98	Perth, Australia	12 February 1989

== Qualification standards ==
A standard	B standard
1.95 m	1.91 m

== Schedule ==
Date	Time	Round
August 18, 2009	10:20	Qualification
August 20, 2009	19:10	Final

== Results ==
=== Qualification ===
Qualification: Qualifying Performance 1.95 (Q) or at least 12 best performers (q) advance to the final.

Rank	Group	Name	Nationality	1.80	1.85	1.89	1.92	1.95	Result	Notes
1	A	Blanka Vlašić	Croatia	-	o	o	o	o	1.95	Q
1	B	Ariane Friedrich	Germany	-	-	-	-	o	1.95	Q
1	B	Emma Green	Sweden	-	o	-	o	o	1.95	Q
4	A	Chaunte Howard	United States	o	o	xo	o	o	1.95	Q
4	A	Ruth Beitia	Spain	-	o	o	xo	o	1.95	Q
4	B	Antonietta Di Martino	Italy	o	o	xo	o	o	1.95	Q
4	B	Anna Chicherova	Russia	-	o	o	xo	o	1.95	Q
8	B	Amy Acuff	United States	o	o	o	xxo	xo	1.95	Q, SB
9	B	Yelena Slesarenko	Russia	-	o	o	xxo	xxo	1.95	Q
10	A	Meike Kröger	Germany	o	o	o	o	xxx	1.92	q
11	A	Svetlana Shkolina	Russia	o	o	o	xo	xxx	1.92	q
11	A	Melanie Melfort	France	o	o	o	xo	xxx	1.92	q
13	A	Marina Aitova	Kazakhstan	o	o	xo	xo	xxx	1.92	
13	B	Adonía Steryíou	Greece	xo	o	o	xo	xxx	1.92	SB
15	B	Venelina Veneva	Bulgaria	o	xo	o	xxo	xxx	1.92	
16	B	Kamila Stepaniuk	Poland	o	o	xxo	xxo	xxx	1.92	
17	A	Anna Iljuštšenko	Estonia	o	o	o	xxx		1.89	
17	A	Vita Palamar	Ukraine	-	o	o	xxx		1.89	
17	A	Sharon Day	United States	o	o	o	xxx		1.89	
17	B	Petrina Price	Australia	o	o	o	xxx		1.89	
21	A	Iva Straková	Czech Republic	o	o	xo	xxx		1.89	
21	A	Svetlana Radzivil	Uzbekistan	o	o	xo	xxx		1.89	
21	B	Hanna Grobler	Finland	o	o	xo	xxx		1.89	
24	A	Levern Spencer	Saint Lucia	-	o	xxo	xxx		1.89	
24	B	Nadiya Dusanova	Uzbekistan	o	o	xxo	xxx		1.89	
26	A	Noengrothai Chaipetch	Thailand	xxo	o	xxo	xxx		1.89	SB
27	B	Doreen Amata	Nigeria	o	o	xxx			1.85	
28	A	Caterine Ibargüen	Colombia	o	xo	xxx			1.85	
28	B	Stine Kufaas	Norway	o	xo	xxx			1.85	
30	B	Yekaterina Yevseyeva	Kazakhstan	xo	xo	xxx			1.85	
31	A	Deirdre Ryan	Ireland	o	xxo	xxx			1.85	
32	A	Romary Rifka	Mexico	o	xxx				1.80	
	B	Bui Thi Nhung	Vietnam	xxx					NM	

Key: Q = qualification by place in heat, q = qualification by overall place, SB = Seasonal best

=== Final ===
Rank	Name	Nationality	1.87	1.92	1.96	1.99	2.02	2.04	2.06	2.10	Result	Notes
1st place, gold medalist(s)	Blanka Vlašić	Croatia	o	o	o	o	xo	xo	–	xxx	2.04	
DSQ	Anna Chicherova	Russia	o	o	xo	o	o	xxx			2.02	SB
2nd place, silver medalist(s)	Ariane Friedrich	Germany	–	o	–	o	xxo	xx-	x		2.02	
3rd place, bronze medalist(s)	Antonietta Di Martino	Italy	o	o	xo	xo	xxx				1.99	
4	Ruth Beitia	Spain	o	o	o	xxo	xxx				1.99	
5	Svetlana Shkolina	Russia	o	o	o	xxx					1.96	
6	Emma Green	Sweden	o	o	xo	xxx					1.96	SB
7	Chaunte Howard	United States	o	o	xo	xxx					1.96	
8	Melanie Melfort	France	xo	o	xxx						1.92	
9	Yelena Slesarenko	Russia	o	xxo	xxx						1.92	
10	Meike Kröger	Germany	o	xxx							1.87	
11	Amy Acuff	United States	xxo	xxx							1.87	
