= 2005 European Athletics U23 Championships – Women's high jump =

The women's high jump event at the 2005 European Athletics U23 Championships was held in Erfurt, Germany, at Steigerwaldstadion on 16 July.

== Medalists ==
Gold	Tatyana Kivimyagi; Russia
Silver	Emma Green; Sweden
Bronze	Ariane Friedrich; Germany

== Results ==
=== Final ===
16 July

Rank	Name	Nationality	Attempts									Result	Notes
Rank	Name	Nationality	1.70	1.75	1.80	1.84	1.87	1.90	1.92	1.94	1.96	Result	Notes
1st place, gold medalist(s)	Tatyana Kivimyagi	Russia	–	–	o	o	o	o	xxo	o	xxx	1.94	
2nd place, silver medalist(s)	Emma Green	Sweden	–	–	o	o	o	o	o	xx–	x	1.92	
3rd place, bronze medalist(s)	Ariane Friedrich	Germany	–	–	o	o	xo	o	xxx			1.90	
4	Anna Ksok	Poland	–	o	o	o	o	xx–	x			1.87	
5	Persefoni Hatzinakou	Greece	o	o	o	o	xxo	xxx				1.87	
6	Jonna Anias	Finland	o	o	o	o	xxx					1.84	
7	Raffaella Lamera	Italy	o	o	o	xxo	xxx					1.84	
8	Anett Jambor	Germany	–	o	xo	xxo	xxx					1.84	
9	Elena Brambilla	Italy	o	xo	o	xxx						1.80	
10	Adonia Steryiou	Greece	o	o	xxx							1.75	
11	Anna Iljuštšenko	Estonia	o	xxx								1.70	

== Participation ==
According to an unofficial count, 11 athletes from 8 countries participated in the event.

- Estonia (1)
- Finland (1)
- Germany (2)
- Greece (2)
- Italy (2)
- Poland (1)
- Russia (1)
- Sweden (1)
