= 1998 European Athletics Indoor Championships – Women's high jump =

The women's high jump event at the 1998 European Athletics Indoor Championships was held on 28 February.

== Results ==
Rank	Athlete	Nationality	1.70	1.75	1.80	1.85	1.89	1.92	1.94	1.96	2.00	Result	Notes
1st place, gold medalist(s)	Monica Iagăr	Romania	–	–	o	o	o	o	o	xxo	x–	1.96	
2nd place, silver medalist(s)	Alina Astafei	Germany	–	–	o	o	o	o	o	xxx		1.94	
3rd place, bronze medalist(s)	Yelena Yelesina	Russia	–	–	o	o	xxo	o	xo	xxx		1.94	
4	Yelena Gulyayeva	Russia	–	–	o	o	xo	o	xxx			1.92	
5	Zuzana Kováčiková	Czech Republic	–	–	o	o	o	xo	xxx			1.92	
6	Susan Jones	Great Britain	–	o	o	o	xo	xo	xxx			1.92	
7	Pia Zinck	Denmark	–	o	xo	xxo	xo	xxx				1.89	
8	Marta Mendía	Spain	o	o	o	o	xxx					1.85	
9	Debbie Marti	Great Britain	–	o	o	xo	xxx					1.85	
10	Natalia Jonckheere	Belgium	o	o	o	xxo	xxx					1.85	
11	Michelle Dunkley	Great Britain	–	o	xo	xxo	xxx					1.85	
12	Yuliya Lyakhova	Russia	–	–	o	xxx						1.80	
12	Sieglinde Cadusch	Switzerland	–	o	o	xxx						1.80	
14	Çiğdem Aslan	Turkey	–	–	xo	xxx						1.80	
