= Yekaterina Yevseyeva =

Kazakhstani high jumper

Medal record

Women's athletics

Representing Kazakhstan

Asian Championships
Silver medal – second place	2007 Amman	High jump

Asian Indoor Championships
Bronze medal – third place	2008 Doha	High jump

Yekaterina Yevseyeva (born 22 June 1988 in Almaty, Kazakhstan) is a Kazakhstani high jumper.

She was born in Almaty. She won bronze medals at the 2005 World Youth Championships and the 2006 World Junior Championships. She also competed at the 2008 World Indoor Championships and the 2008 Olympic Games without reaching the final.

Her personal best jump is 1.98 metres, achieved in May 2008 in Tashkent. This is the Asian record, although she shares it with two athletes: Nadejda Dusanova and Svetlana Radzivil.

== Major competitions record ==
Year	Competition	Venue	Position	Notes
Representing Kazakhstan
2005	World Youth Championships	Marrakesh, Morocco	3rd	1.85 m
2006	Asian Junior Championships	Macau	2nd	1.88 m
2006	World Junior Championships	Beijing, China	3rd	1.84 m
2007	Asian Championships	Amman, Jordan	2nd	1.91 m
2007	Asian Indoor Games	Macau	2nd	1.88 m
2008	Asian Indoor Championships	Doha, Qatar	3rd	1.88 m
2008	World Indoor Championships	Valencia, Spain	13th (q)	1.86 m
2008	Olympic Games	Beijing, China	28th (q)	1.85 m
2009	Universiade	Belgrade, Serbia	2nd	1.91 m
2009	World Championships	Berlin, Germany	30th (q)	1.85 m
2009	Asian Indoor Games	Hanoi, Vietnam	9th	1.80 m
