= 2007 World Championships in Athletics – Women's high jump =

The women's high jump event at the 2007 World Championships in Athletics took place on August 31, 2007 (qualification) and 2 September 2007 (final) at the Nagai Stadium in Osaka, Japan.

== Medallists ==
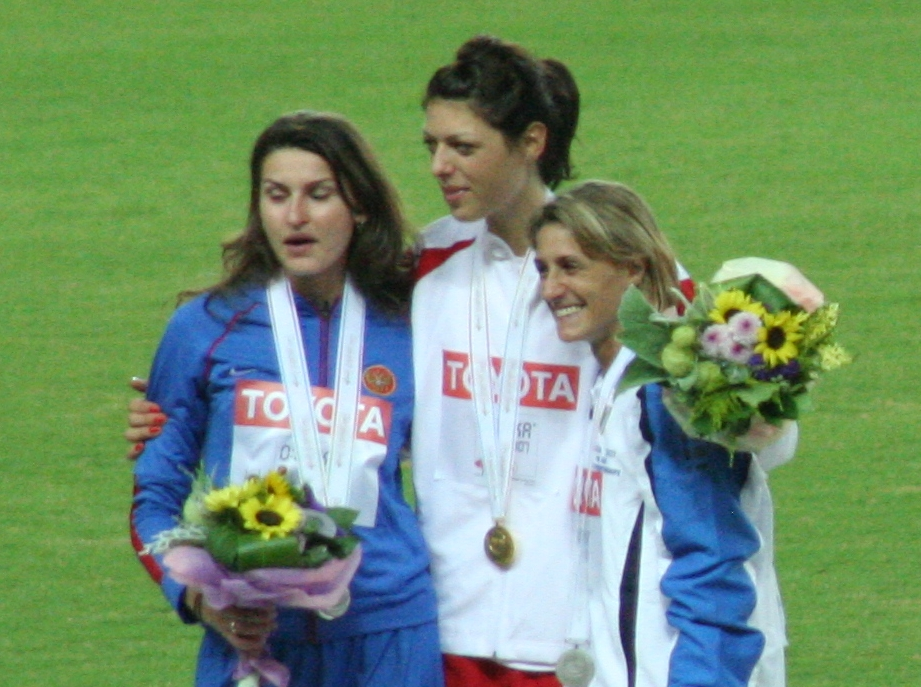
Victory ceremony

Gold	Blanka Vlašić; Croatia (CRO)
Silver	Antonietta Di Martino; Italy (ITA)
Silver	Anna Chicherova; Russia (RUS)

== Records ==
World Record	(Bulgaria) Stefka Kostadinova	2.09 m	Rome, Italy	30 August 1987
Championship Record	(Bulgaria) Stefka Kostadinova	2.09 m	Rome, Italy	30 August 1987

== Results ==
=== Qualification ===
Qualification: 1.94 m (Q) or best 12 performances (q)

Rank	Group	Name	Nationality	1.80	1.84	1.88	1.91	1.94	Result	Notes
1	A	Kajsa Bergqvist	Sweden	–	o	o	o	o	1.94	Q
1	A	Vita Palamar	Ukraine	–	o	–	o	o	1.94	Q
1	A	Yelena Slesarenko	Russia	–	o	o	o	o	1.94	Q
1	A	Blanka Vlašić	Croatia	–	o	–	o	o	1.94	Q
1	B	Ruth Beitia	Spain	–	o	o	o	o	1.94	Q
1	B	Anna Chicherova	Russia	–	o	o	o	o	1.94	Q
7	A	Marina Aitova	Kazakhstan	o	o	o	xo	o	1.94	Q
7	B	Emma Green	Sweden	–	o	xo	o	o	1.94	Q
9	A	Amy Acuff	United States	–	xo	xo	xo	o	1.94	Q
10	A	Miruna Mataoanu	Romania	–	o	xo	o	xo	1.94	Q, PB
10	B	Antonietta Di Martino	Italy	o	o	xo	o	xo	1.94	Q
10	B	Yekaterina Savchenko	Russia	o	o	o	xo	xo	1.94	Q
13	A	Tia Hellebaut	Belgium	–	o	o	xxo	xo	1.94	Q
14	A	Barbora Laláková	Czech Republic	o	o	o	o	xxo	1.94	Q
14	A	Levern Spencer	Saint Lucia	–	o	o	o	xxo	1.94	Q, NR
16	B	Melanie Skotnik	France	o	o	o	xxo	xxo	1.94	Q
17	A	Romana Dubnová	Czech Republic	o	o	xo	xo	xxx	1.91	
18	B	Iva Straková	Czech Republic	o	o	xxo	xxo	xxx	1.91	
19	B	Romary Rifka	Mexico	o	o	o	xxx		1.88	
20	A	Dóra Győrffy	Hungary	o	o	xo	xxx		1.88	
20	B	Anna Ustinova	Kazakhstan	o	o	xo	xxx		1.88	
22	A	Marta Mendía	Spain	xo	o	xo	xxx		1.88	
23	B	Ebba Jungmark	Sweden	o	xxo	xo	xxx		1.88	
24	B	Erin Aldrich	United States	o	o	xxo	xxx		1.88	
25	A	Inna Gliznuta	Moldova	xo	o	xxo	xxx		1.88	
25	B	Adonia Steryiou	Greece	xo	o	xxo	xxx		1.88	
27	B	Juana Arrendel	Dominican Republic	xo	o	xxx			1.84	
28	A	Miyuki Aoyama	Japan	o	xo	xxx			1.84	
28	B	Nicole Forrester	Canada	–	xo	xxx			1.84	
28	B	Oana Pantelimon	Romania	o	xo	xxx			1.84	

=== Final ===
Rank	Name	Nationality	1.85	1.90	1.94	1.97	2.00	2.03	2.05	2.10	Result	Notes
1st place, gold medalist(s)	Blanka Vlašić	Croatia	o	o	o	o	xo	o	xxo	xxx	2.05	
2nd place, silver medalist(s)	Anna Chicherova	Russia	o	o	o	o	xo	xo	xxx		2.03	PB
2nd place, silver medalist(s)	Antonietta Di Martino	Italy	xo	o	o	o	o	xo	xxx		2.03	=NR
4	Yelena Slesarenko	Russia	o	o	o	o	xo	xxx			2.00	
5	Yekaterina Savchenko	Russia	o	o	xo	o	xxo	xxx			2.00	PB
6	Ruth Beitia	Spain	o	o	o	xo	xxx				1.97	
7	Marina Aitova	Kazakhstan	o	o	o	xxx					1.94	
7	Kajsa Bergqvist	Sweden	o	o	o	xxx					1.94	
7	Emma Green	Sweden	o	o	o	xxx					1.94	
7	Melanie Skotnik	France	o	o	o	xxx					1.94	
7	Vita Palamar	Ukraine	o	o	o	xxx					1.94	
12	Amy Acuff	United States	o	xo	xxo	xxx					1.94	
13	Miruna Mataoanu	Romania	xo	o	xxx						1.90	
14	Tia Hellebaut	Belgium	o	xo	xxx						1.90	
15	Barbora Laláková	Czech Republic	o	xxo	xxx						1.90	
15	Levern Spencer	Saint Lucia	o	xxo	xxx						1.90	
