= Iva Straková =

Czech high jumper

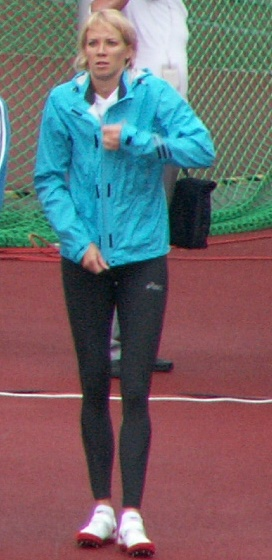
- Iva Straková in 2009

Personal information
- Nationality: Czech
- Born: 4 August 1980 (age 45) Tábor, Czechoslovakia
- Height: 1.87 m (6 ft 2 in)
- Weight: 65 kg (143 lb)

Sport
- Country: Czech Republic
- Sport: Track and field
- Event: High jump

Iva Straková (born 4 August 1980) is a Czech athlete who specialises in the high jump.

She has represented Czech Republic at two Summer Olympics (2004, 2008). At Beijing 2008 Straková achieved 12th place at the final. She has won Czech Championships several times. Has participated in several World and European Championships.

She has personal bests of 1.95 metres outdoors (2007, 2008) and 1.98 metres indoors (2008).

== Competition record ==
Year	Competition	Venue	Position	Notes
Representing Czech Republic
2002	European Championships	Munich, Germany	15th (q)	1.87 m
2003	World Indoor Championships	Birmingham, United Kingdom	13th (q)	1.90 m
2003	World Championships	Paris, France	21st (q)	1.80 m
2004	Olympic Games	Athens, Greece	16th (q)	1.89 m
2005	European Indoor Championships	Madrid, Spain	7th	1.89 m (1.92)
2005	World Championships	Helsinki, Finland	11th	1.85 m (1.91)
2006	World Indoor Championships	Moscow, Russia	10th (q)	1.93 m
2006	European Championships	Gothenburg, Sweden	22nd (q)	1.83 m
2007	World Championships	Osaka, Japan	18th (q)	1.91 m
2008	World Indoor Championships	Valencia, Spain	8th	1.93 m
2008	Olympic Games	Beijing, China	9th	1.93 m
2009	European Indoor Championships	Turin, Italy	7th	1.92 m
2009	World Championships	Berlin, Germany	21st (q)	1.89 m
2010	World Indoor Championships	Doha, Qatar	9th	1.91 m (1.92)
(q) Indicates overall position in qualifying round (#) Indicates superior height achieved in qualifying round
