= 1999 European Athletics U23 Championships – Women's heptathlon =

The women's heptathlon event at the 1999 European Athletics U23 Championships was held in Gothenburg, Sweden, at Ullevi on 31 July and 1 August 1999.

== Medalists ==
Gold	Natalya Roshchupkina; Russia
Silver	Yelena Prokhorova; Russia
Bronze	Sonja Kesselschläger; Germany

== Results ==
=== Final ===
31 July-1 August

The highest mark recorded in each event is highlighted in yellow

Rank	Name	Nationality	100m H	HJ	SP	200m	LJ	JT	800m	Points	Notes
1st place, gold medalist(s)	Natalya Roshchupkina	Russia	14.06 (w: -0.7 m/s)	1.81	13.99	23.78	5.95	41.56	2:18.95	6125	
2nd place, silver medalist(s)	Yelena Prokhorova	Russia	14.12 (w: -0.7 m/s)	1.81	12.96	24.58	6.13	37.54	2:14.66	6011	
3rd place, bronze medalist(s)	Sonja Kesselschläger	Germany	13.99 (w: -0.7 m/s)	1.84	12.89	25.77	5.99	40.93	2:25.17	5832	
4	Susanna Rajamäki	Finland	14.17 (w: -0.7 m/s)	1.66	13.47	24.43 (w: 0.6 m/s)	6.03	40.92	2:26.13	5745	
5	Nicola Gautier	United Kingdom	14.10 (w: -0.7 m/s)	1.57	15.01	24.93	5.65	42.96	2:21.96	5685	
6	Austra Skujytė	Lithuania	15.03 (w: -1.4 m/s)	1.81	13.15	26.14 (w: -0.6 m/s)	5.79	42.27	2:24.40	5613	
7	Tia Hellebaut	Belgium	14.52 (w: -0.7 m/s)	1.81	12.22	26.00 (w: -0.6 m/s)	5.63	39.37	2:22.88	5548	
8	Šárka Beránková	Czech Republic	14.73 (w: -1.4 m/s)	1.66	12.07	24.33 (w: -0.8 m/s)	5.87 (w: 0.7 m/s)	38.26	2:21.95	5540	
9	Yuliya Akulenko	Ukraine	14.78 (w: -0.7 m/s)	1.69	11.98	25.43	5.96	43.61	2:29.92	5489	
10	Julie Mezerette	France	14.78 (w: -1.4 m/s)	1.78	8.93	25.62 (w: -0.6 m/s)	5.79	38.96	2:19.44	5379	
11	Laureta Derhemi	Albania	15.49 (w: -1.4 m/s)	1.72	9.43	26.32 (w: -0.6 m/s)	5.44	36.51	2:23.80	4974	
	Julie Hollman	United Kingdom	14.45 (w: -1.4 m/s)	1.69	11.50	24.67	6.23	32.67		DNF	
	Marina Lippid-Servitz	Israel	15.36 (w: -1.4 m/s)	1.69	10.97	26.75 (w: -0.6 m/s)	5.16			DNF	

== Participation ==
According to an unofficial count, 13 athletes from 11 countries participated in the event.

- Albania (1)
- Belgium (1)
- Czech Republic (1)
- Finland (1)
- France (1)
- Germany (1)
- Israel (1)
- Lithuania (1)
- Russia (2)
- Ukraine (1)
- United Kingdom (2)
