= Desislava Aleksandrova-Mladenova =

Bulgarian high jumper

Desislava Aleksandrova-Mladenova (Bulgarian: Десислава Александрова-Младенова) (born 27 October 1975) is a retired Bulgarian athlete who specialised in the high jump. She won a silver medal at the 1994 European Indoor Championships, setting a new European junior indoor record of 1.96 metres.

Her personal bests in the event are 1.93 metres outdoors (Rhodes 1997) and 1.96 metres indoors (Paris 1994).

== Competition record ==
Year	Competition	Venue	Position	Notes
Representing Bulgaria
1992	World Junior Championships	Seoul, South Korea	5th	1.85 m
1993	European Junior Championships	San Sebastián, Spain	2nd	1.89 m
1993	World Championships	Stuttgart, Germany	30th (q)	1.80 m
1994	European Indoor Championships	Paris, France	2nd	1.96 m
1996	European Indoor Championships	Stockholm, Sweden	17th (q)	1.80 m
