= Ariane Friedrich =

German high jumper (born 1984)

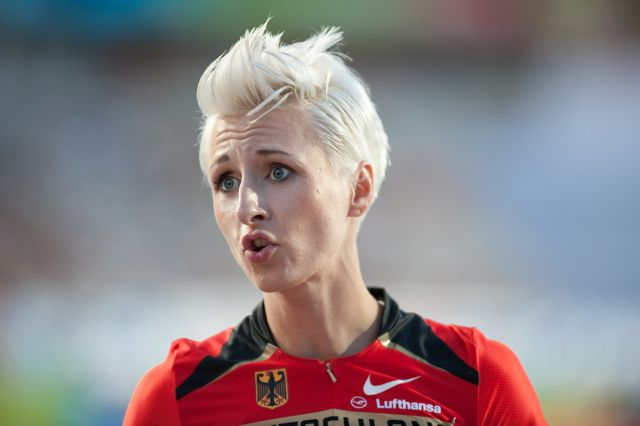
- Ariane Friedrich in 2010

Personal information
- Nationality: German
- Born: Ariane Tempel; 10 January 1984 (age 42) Nordhausen, East Germany
- Height: 1.79 m (5 ft 10 in)
- Weight: 61 kg (134 lb)

Sport
- Country: Germany
- Sport: Track and field
- Event: High jump
Medal record
Women's athletics
Representing Germany
World Championships
Silver medal – second place	2009 Berlin	High jump
European Championships
Bronze medal – third place	2010 Barcelona	High jump
European Indoor Championships
Gold medal – first place	2009 Torino	High jump
Universiade
Gold medal – first place	2009 Belgrade	High jump
Silver medal – second place	2007 Bangkok	High jump
Bronze medal – third place	2005 İzmir	High jump

Ariane Friedrich (née Tempel; 10 January 1984) is a German high jumper. She won the silver medal at the 2009 World Championships and represented Germany at the 2008 Summer Olympics and 2012 Summer Olympics. She is the German outdoor record holder in the event with a best of 2.06 m, although this is 1 cm less than the indoor record held by Heike Henkel.

She became German champion in 2004, 2007, 2008, 2009 and 2010, and represents the club LG Eintracht Frankfurt.

Controversy arose in 2012 when she named an alleged stalker on Facebook, potentially violating German privacy laws.

== Career ==
Friedrich won the gold medal at the 2003 European Junior Championships, the bronze medal at the 2005 Summer Universiade, silver at the 2007 Summer Universiade and the gold medal at the 2009 Summer Universiade.

The 2008 indoor season saw significant improvement in Friedrich's clearances: she improved her best by 8 cm during the period, clearing two metres for the first time and setting her top mark at 2.02 m. Her coach noted that these achievements were due to her improved work ethic and focus. She finished eighth at the 2008 World Indoor Championships and took seventh in the high jump final at the 2008 Beijing Olympics.

Her 2009 indoor season started strongly with a win at the 2009 European Athletics Indoor Championships in a jump of 2.01 m. Her outdoor season started with a personal best jump of 2.06 metres in June 2009 at the Internationales Stadionfest, breaking Heike Henkel's outdoor national record of 2.05 m, and she won another gold at the 2009 European Team Championships later that month. She gained a complete set of Universiade medals in July when she finally won the gold at the 2009 Summer Universiade.

Ariane Friedrich won the bronze medal at the 2009 World Championships in Athletics in Berlin. She reflected that the public pressure for her to become world champion had placed her under much stress. However, she was very happy at having achieved a jump of 2.02 m for third place behind Blanka Vlašić and Anna Chicherova. Friedrich missed the 2010 IAAF World Indoor Championships due to a knee injury and instead set her sights on medalling at the 2010 European Athletics Championships. She jumped 2.01 m at the European Championships in Barcelona, but she was beaten by Vlašić (who equalled the championship record) and also by Emma Green on count-back, leaving her with the bronze medal. She became the first German woman to win at the Internationales Hochsprung-Meeting Eberstadt a month later.

On 22 December 2010 she ruptured her left Achilles tendon during training and was ruled out of the entire 2011 season including the World Championships in Daegu.

She failed to make the final at the 2012 London Olympic Games, finishing 14th in the Qualifying Rounds. In September 2014, she gave birth to a baby girl. She came back to the competition in January 2016, after almost four years. She jumped for her first competition 1,87 m.

== Personal bests ==
Event	Best (m)	Venue	Date
High jump (outdoor)	2.06	Berlin, Germany	14 June 2009
High jump (indoor)	2.05	Karlsruhe, Germany	15 February 2009

- All information taken from IAAF profile.

== Competition record ==
Year	Competition	Venue	Position	Notes
2003	European Junior Championships	Tampere, Finland	1st	1.88 m
2004	European Cup	Bydgoszcz, Poland	3rd	1.92 m
2005	European Cup	Florence, Italy	7th	1.85 m
2005	European U23 Championships	Erfurt, Germany	3rd	1.90 m
2005	Universiade	İzmir, Turkey	3rd	1.88 m
2007	European Indoor Championships	Birmingham, United Kingdom	11th (q)	1.87 m (xxo)
2007	Universiade	Bangkok, Thailand	2nd	1.90 m (o)
2008	European Indoor Cup	Moscow, Russia	1st	2.00 m
2008	World Indoor Championships	Valencia, Spain	8th	1.93 (xo)
2008	Olympic Games	Beijing, China	4th	1.96 m (o)
2008	World Athletics Final	Stuttgart, Germany	4th	1.97 m
2009	European Indoor Championships	Turin, Italy	1st	2.01 m (o)
2009	European Team Championships	Leiria, Portugal	1st	2.02 m
2009	Universiade	Belgrade, Serbia	1st	2.00 m (o)
2009	World Championships	Berlin, Germany	2nd	2.02 m (xxo)
2010	European Team Championships	Bergen, Norway	3rd	1.98 m (xxo)
2010	European Championships	Barcelona, Spain	3rd	2.01 m (xxo)
2012	Olympic Games	London, United Kingdom	14th (q)	1.93 m (xxo)

- Results with a Q, indicate overall position in qualifying round.

== See also ==
- Female two metres club
