= Romary Rifka =

Mexican high jumper

Personal information
- Born: 23 December 1970 (age 55) Poza Rica, Veracruz, Mexico

Sport
- Sport: Track and field
Medal record
Athletics
Representing Mexico
Pan American Games
Gold medal – first place	2007 Rio de Janeiro	High jump
Silver medal – second place	2003 Santo Domingo	High jump
Bronze medal – third place	2011 Guadalajara	High jump
Central American and Caribbean Games
Silver medal – second place	2002 San Salvador	High jump
Bronze medal – third place	2010 Mayagüez	High jump

María Romary Rifka González (born 23 December 1970) is a Mexican high jumper. She is married to track & field athlete, Alejandro Cárdenas. Her personal best jump is 1.97 metres, achieved in April 2004 in Xalapa. This is the current Mexican record.

== Achievements ==
Year	Competition	Venue	Position	Event	Notes
Representing Mexico
1986	Central American and Caribbean Junior Championships (U-17)	Mexico City, Mexico	2nd	High jump	1.65 m A
1986	Central American and Caribbean Junior Championships (U-17)	Mexico City, Mexico	1st	Long jump	6.01 m A
1988	Ibero-American Championships	Mexico City, Mexico	8th	High jump	1.60 m A
1988	Ibero-American Championships	Mexico City, Mexico	9th	Long jump	5.43 m A
1990	Ibero-American Championships	Manaus, Brazil	5th	High jump	1.70 m
1990	Ibero-American Championships	Manaus, Brazil	6th	Long jump	5.17 m
1995	Central American and Caribbean Championships	Guatemala City, Guatemala	3rd	High jump	1.75 m A
1997	Central American and Caribbean Championships	San Juan, Puerto Rico	3rd	High jump	1.79 m
1998	Ibero-American Championships	Lisbon, Portugal	4th	High jump	1.81 m
1998	Central American and Caribbean Games	Maracaibo, Venezuela	4th	High jump	1.76 m
1999	Central American and Caribbean Championships	Bridgetown, Barbados	2nd	High jump	1.77 m
2000	Ibero-American Championships	Rio de Janeiro, Brazil	6th	High jump	1.78 m
2001	Central American and Caribbean Championships	Guatemala City, Guatemala	2nd	High jump	1.75 m A
2001	Central American and Caribbean Championships	Guatemala City, Guatemala	5th	Long jump	5.79 m A
2002	Central American and Caribbean Games	San Salvador, El Salvador	2nd	High jump	1.85 m
2003	Pan American Games	Santo Domingo, Dominican Republic	2nd	High jump	1.94 m =NR
2003	World Championships	Paris, France	21st (q)	High jump	1.80 m
2004	Ibero-American Championships	Huelva, Spain	1st	High jump	1.94 m
2004	Olympic Games	Athens, Greece	14th (q)	High jump	1.92 m
2005	Central American and Caribbean Championships	Nassau, Bahamas	4th	High jump	1.80 m
2007	NACAC Championships	San Salvador, El Salvador	2nd	High jump	1.87 m
2007	Pan American Games	Rio de Janeiro, Brazil	1st	High jump	1.95 m
2007	World Championships	Osaka, Japan	19th (q)	High jump	1.88 m
2008	World Indoor Championships	Valencia, Spain	12th (q)	High jump	1.90 m
2008	Olympic Games	Beijing, China	–	High jump	NM
2009	World Championships	Berlin, Germany	32nd (q)	High jump	1.80 m
2010	Ibero-American Championships	San Fernando, Spain	3rd	High jump	1.83 m
2010	Central American and Caribbean Games	Mayagüez, Puerto Rico	3rd	High jump	1.91 m
2011	Central American and Caribbean Championships	Mayagüez, Puerto Rico	4th	High jump	1.79 m
2011	Pan American Games	Guadalajara, Mexico	3rd	High jump	1.89 m
2012	Ibero-American Championships	Barquisimeto, Venezuela	1st	High jump	1.89 m
2013	Central American and Caribbean Championships	Morelia, Mexico	4th	High jump	1.78 m
