= Manuela Aigner =

German high jumper

Manuela Aigner (born 26 March 1973) is a retired German high jumper.

She won the 1991 European Junior Championships and the 1992 World Junior Championships, the latter in a career best jump of 1.93 metres. She represented the sports club BSV AOK Leipzig, and won the bronze medal at the German championships in 1994.
