= Yekaterina Savchenko =

Russian high jumper

Personal information
- Born: 3 June 1977 (age 49) Omsk, Soviet Union

Sport
- Sport: Track and field

Yekaterina Savchenko, née Aleksandrova (Russian: Савченко Александрова Екатерина Александровна, born 3 June 1977) is a high jumper from the Omsk region of Russia. She is a member of Trade Unions Athletics Club and she was coached by Yevgeni Savchenko. She had wins at the Russian Athletics Championships in 2001 and 2006.

Her personal best jump is 2.00 metres, achieved in July 2007 in Dudelange at the Memorial Sam Besch. Her indoor personal best is 1.98 m, from the 2006 IAAF World Indoor Championships in Moscow.

== International competitions ==
Representing Russia
Year	Competition	Venue	Position	Event	Result	Notes
1994	World Junior Championships	Lisbon, Portugal	7th	High jump	1.80 m	
1995	European Junior Championships	Nyíregyháza, Hungary	7th	High jump	1.84 m	
1999	Universiade	Palma de Mallorca, Spain	5th	High jump	1.88 m	
2001	World Championships	Edmonton, Canada	16th (q)	High jump	1.88 m	
2005	European Indoor Championships	Madrid, Spain	6th	High jump	1.92 m	
2006	World Indoor Championships	Moscow, Russia	4th	High jump	1.98 m	
2006	European Championships	Gothenburg, Sweden	7th	High jump	1.95 m	
2007	World Championships	Osaka, Japan	5th	High jump	2.00 m	
2008	World Indoor Championships	Valencia, Spain	7th	High jump	1.93 m	
