= Emma Green (athlete) =

Swedish high jumper

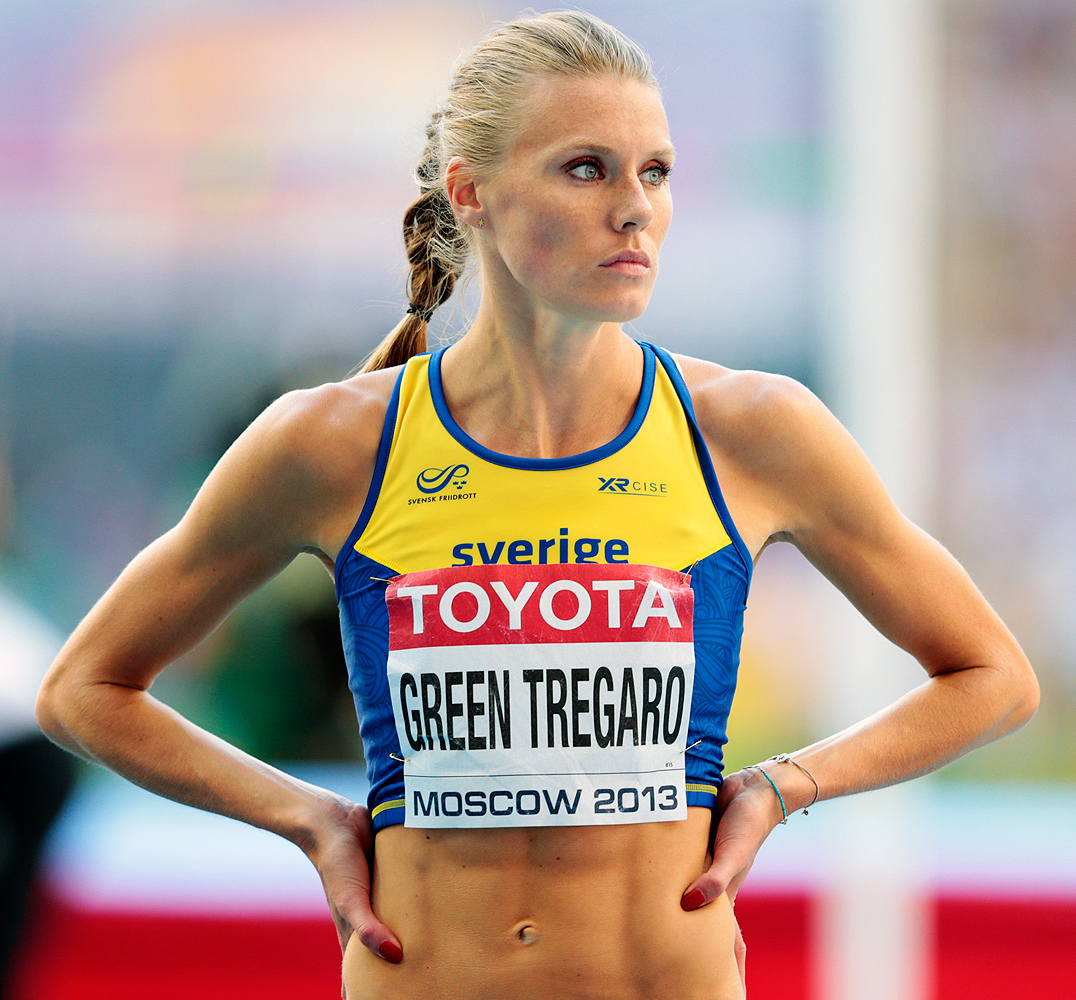
- Green Tregaro on World Championships in Moscow, Russia in August 2013

Personal information
- Nationality: Swedish
- Born: 8 December 1984 (age 41) Gothenburg, Sweden
- Height: 1.80 m (5 ft 11 in)
- Weight: 62 kg (137 lb; 9 st 11 lb)

Sport
- Sport: Track and field
- Event: High jump
- Coached by: Yannick Tregaro
- Retired: 2017

Achievements and titles
- Personal best: 2.01 m (2010)
Medal record
Women's athletics
Representing Sweden
World Championships
Bronze medal – third place	2005 Helsinki	High jump
European Championships
Silver medal – second place	2010 Barcelona	High jump
Bronze medal – third place	2012 Helsinki	High jump
European Indoor Championships
Bronze medal – third place	2013 Gothenburg	High jump
Continental Cup
Silver medal – second place	2010 Split	High jump
- Updated on 22 April 2012

Emma Anna-Maria Green, also known as Emma Green Tregaro (born 8 December 1984) is a retired Swedish high jumper. She won a bronze medal in the event at the 2005 IAAF World Championships. She represented Sweden at the 2008 and 2012 Summer Olympics. She finished 2nd at the 2010 European Athletics Championships with a new personal best of 2.01 m.

== Biography ==
Emma Green was born in Gothenburg, Sweden, where she lived with mother Maria, father Lennart, and younger brother Erik. She finished gymnasium in 2003, then with a goal to participate in the 2006 European Athletics Championships.

She won the bronze medal in the 2005 World Championships in Athletics, where she got the result 1.96 metres — a new personal best.

On 1 July 2010 Emma Green improved her personal best to 1.98 m when she won at the Sollentuna GP, beating her previous best which had lasted almost five years. Only one month later, on 1 August 2010, at the 2010 European Championships in Barcelona, she improved her personal best twice over within 5 minutes; first she jumped 1.99 and then just minutes later she jumped 2.01. This was her first time over the two-metre mark and was worth a European silver medal behind Blanka Vlašić – her first continental medal. She won the Folksam Grand Prix in Gothenburg later that month, jumping 1.95 m.

Apart from being a world class high-jumper she has been a Swedish champion at the 100 m, 200m and long jump and is also a top national level triple jumper.

She won a bronze medal in high jump at the 2012 European Athletics Championships in Helsinki on 28 June.

== Personal life ==
In 2011 Green married her coach Yannick Tregaro, who was also the coach of high jumper Kajsa Bergqvist and triple jumper Christian Olsson. The couple announced their divorce in early 2014.

=== LGBT rights ===
She is a supporter of LGBT rights and painted her nails in rainbow colors during the 2013 World Championships in Moscow as an act of defiance against Russia's recent ban on gay propaganda. Yelena Isinbayeva condemned Green Tregaro's action at a press conference, but later clarified her views. The Swedish Olympic Committee subsequently cautioned their athletes against engaging in the same type of manifestation as Green Tregaro's at the upcoming Winter Olympics 2014.

== Competition record ==
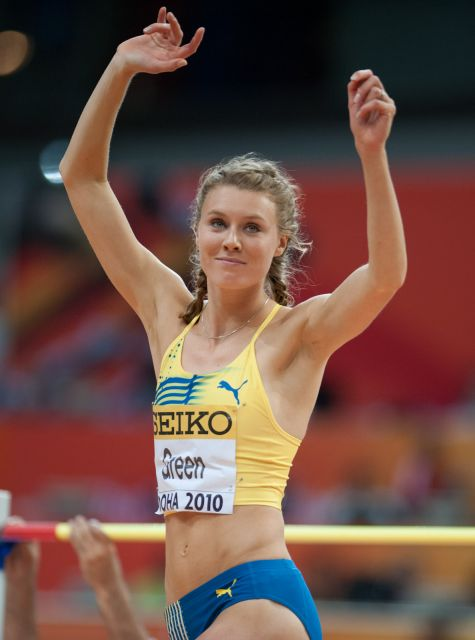
Green in 2010

Year	Competition	Venue	Position	Event	Notes
Representing Sweden
2002	World Junior Championships	Kingston, Jamaica	9th	High jump	1.80 m
2003	European Junior Championships	Tampere, Finland	3rd	High jump	1.86 m
2005	European Indoor Championships	Madrid, Spain	8th	High jump	1.89 m
2005	European U23 Championships	Erfurt, Germany	2nd	High jump	1.92 m
2005	World Championships	Helsinki, Finland	3rd	High jump	1.96 m
2006	World Indoor Championships	Moscow, Russia	14th (q)	High jump	1.90 m
2006	European Cup	Málaga, Spain	5th	200 metres	23.02 (wind: +0.6 m/s)
2006	European Cup	Málaga, Spain	4th	4 × 100 m relay	44.53
2006	European Championships	Gothenburg, Sweden	11th	High jump	1.92 m
2006	European Championships	Gothenburg, Sweden	5th	4 × 100 m relay	44.16
2007	European Indoor Championships	Birmingham, United Kingdom	9th (q)	High jump	1.87 m
2007	World Championships	Osaka, Japan	7th	High jump	1.94 m
2007	World Athletics Final	Stuttgart, Germany	8th	High jump	1.85 m
2008	World Indoor Championships	Valencia, Spain	13th (q)	High jump	1.86 m
2008	Olympic Games	Beijing, China	6th	High jump	1.96 m
2009	European Team Championships	Leiria, Portugal	5th	High jump	1.95 m
2009	World Championships	Berlin, Germany	6th	High jump	1.96 m
2010	World Indoor Championships	Doha, Qatar	5th	High jump	1.94 m
2010	European Championships	Barcelona, Spain	2nd	High jump	2.01 m
2010	Diamond League		3rd	High jump	details
2011	World Championships	Daegu, South Korea	10th	High jump	1.89 m
2012	World Indoor Championships	Istanbul, Turkey	9th (q)	High jump	1.92 m
2012	European Championships	Helsinki, Finland	3rd	High jump	1.92 m
2012	Olympic Games	London, United Kingdom	8th	High jump	1.93 m
2013	European Indoor Championships	Gothenburg, Sweden	3rd	High jump	1.96 m
2013	World Championships	Moscow, Russia	5th	High jump	1.97 m
2013	Diamond League		3rd	High jump	details
2014	World Indoor Championships	Sopot, Poland	5th	High jump	1.94 m
2014	European Championships	Zürich, Switzerland	9th	High jump	1.90 m
2017	European Indoor Championships	Belgrade, Serbia	19th (q)	High jump	1.86 m

== Personal bests ==
- High jump
  - Indoor – 1.98 m
  - Outdoor – 2.01 m (2010)
- Long jump
  - Outdoor – 6.41 m
- Triple jump
  - Outdoor 13.16 m
- 100 meters
  - Outdoor 11.58 seconds
- 200 meters
  - Outdoor 23.02 seconds
- 4 × 100 m
  - Outdoor 44.53 seconds

== See also ==
- Female two metres club

Achievements
Preceded by (Sweden) Carolina Klüft	Women's Swedish National Champion; 2005	Succeeded by (Sweden) Kajsa Bergqvist
