= Antonietta Di Martino =

Italian high jumper

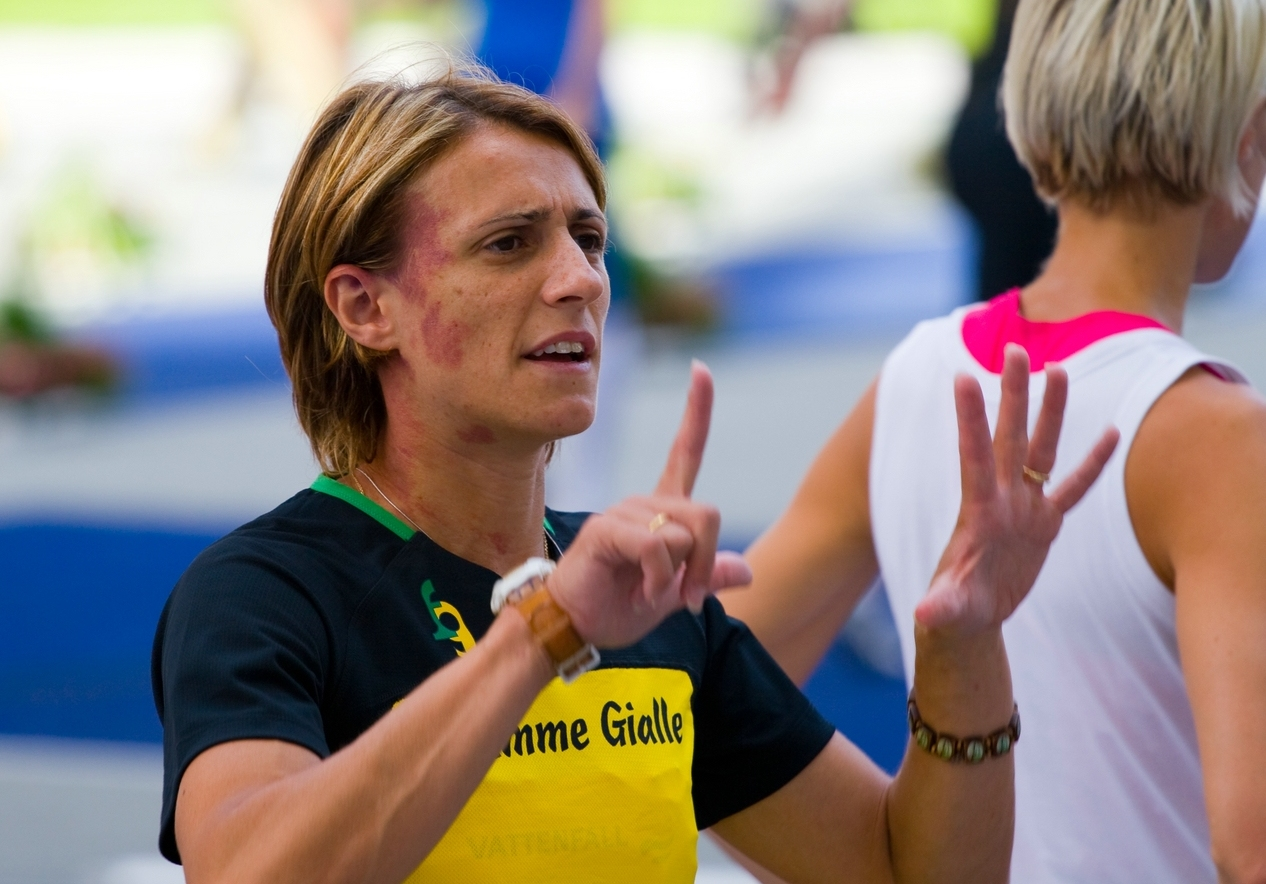
- Di Martino in a G.S. Fiamme Gialle jersey.

Personal information
- National team: Italy: 26 caps (2000-2011)
- Born: 1 June 1978 (age 48) Cava de' Tirreni, Italy
- Height: 1.69 m (5 ft 7 in)
- Weight: 57 kg (126 lb)

Sport
- Sport: Athletics
- Event: High jump
- Club: G.S. Fiamme Gialle
- Retired: 2012 (Note: Officially announced at 2015 Golden Gala.)

Achievements and titles
- Personal bests: High jump: 2.04 m (2011); Heptathlon: 5542 (2001)
Medal record
Event	1st	2nd	3rd
World Championships	0	1	2
World Indoor Championships	0	1	0
European Indoor Championships	1	1	0
Mediterranean Games	1	0	0
European Cup (Super League)	1	1	1
Total	3	4	3
World Championships
Silver medal – second place	2007 Osaka	High jump
Bronze medal – third place	2009 Berlin	High jump
Bronze medal – third place	2011 Daegu	High jump
World Indoor Championships
Silver medal – second place	2012 Istanbul	High jump
European Indoor Championships
Gold medal – first place	2011 Paris	High jump
Silver medal – second place	2007 Birmingham	High jump
European Cup
Gold medal – first place	2010 Bergen	High jump
Silver medal – second place	2008 Annecy	High jump
Bronze medal – third place	2009 Leiria	High jump
Mediterranean Games
Gold medal – first place	2009 Pescara	High jump

Antonietta Di Martino (born 1 June 1978) is a retired Italian high jumper. She currently holds the Italian national women's high jump record at 2.03 metres for outdoor events and 2.04 metres for indoor events. She also currently holds the women's all-time highest jump-differential, meaning she has jumped the highest (0.35 metres) more than her own height.

Her first significant international achievement was winning a silver medal at the 2007 European Indoor Championships in Birmingham. In the same year, she won the silver medal at the 2007 World Championships in Osaka. After a disappointing Olympics in Beijing, she won her first gold medal at the European Indoor Championships in 2011 in Paris and the bronze medal at the 2011 World Championships in Daegu. In 2012, she won another silver medal at the World Indoor Championships.

== Biography ==
=== Early years (1990–2001) ===
Di Martino was born in Cava de' Tirreni. Her athletics history began at the age of 12 at the Youth Games, which highlighted her beginnings. Coincidentally, the high jump was not her first speciality. For much of her youth, she practised the javelin throw and continued trying for multiple disciplines. She debuted in the national team for heptathlon in the European Cup in 2001.

=== Early achievements (2001–2006) ===
Her skills as a high jumper were first discovered in July 2001, during the Italian Championship in Catania when her jump raised her personal best from 1.93 to 1.98 meters, thus equalling the personal best of accomplished Italian high-jumper Antonella Bevilacqua. A month later, she was able to reach the world finals where she finished twelfth at the 2001 World Championships in Edmonton. In 2006, she finished fifth at the World Indoor Championships in Moscow and tenth at the European Championships in Gothenburg.

=== The Golden year - 2007 ===
In February 2007, she cleared 2.00 metres in Banská Bystrica, breaking Sara Simeoni's previous Italian indoor record of 1.98 m. She followed this up with a silver medal at the 2007 European Indoor Championships, where she jumped 1.96 m.

Di Martino also won the silver medal at the 2007 World Championships, having jumped 2.03 m. Her 2008 season was not so successful, and she managed only the tenth position at the 2008 Beijing Olympics and closed the year carrying a serious toe injury, making her consider retiring from the sport.

=== Her return (2009–2012) ===
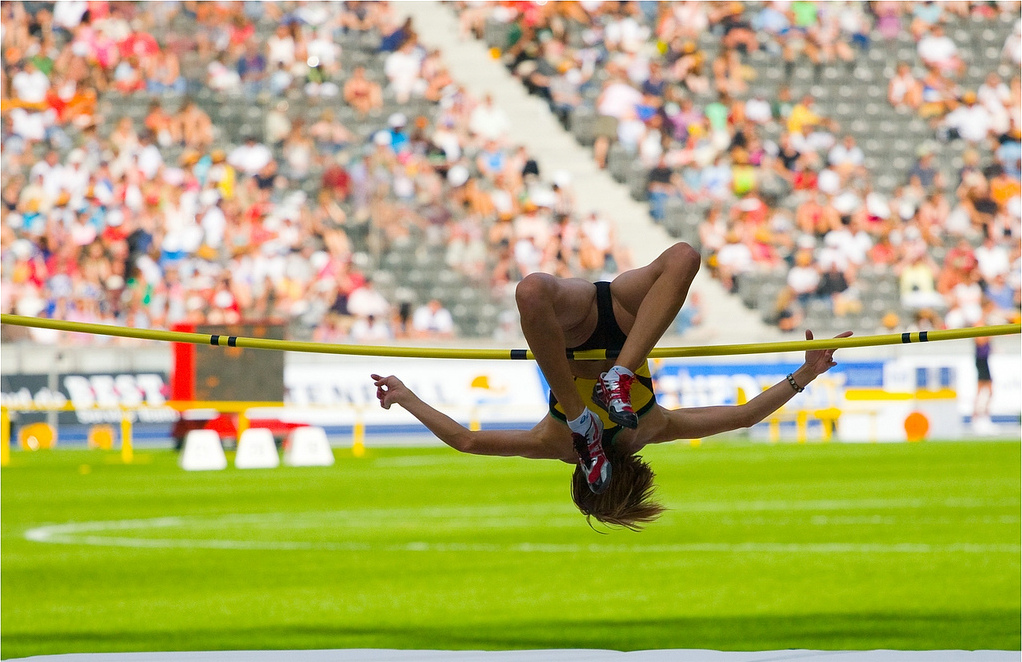
Di Martino in action at ISTAF (2010)

In September 2009, she changed coaches and experienced a resurgence in her form. She won the Italian Indoor Championships, but illness ruled her out of the 2009 European Indoor Championships a few months later. She took bronze at the 2009 European Team Championships and soon after, she beat Blanka Vlašić to win the Golden Gala meeting, jumping 2.00 m in Rome. She cleared 1.99 m at the 2009 World Championships in Athletics, securing a fourth-place finish. She capped off the year with a bronze at the final edition of the World Athletics Final.

Antonietta Di Martino won the gold medal at the 2010 European Team Championships, but did not even pass the qualifying round at the 2010 European Athletics Championships. She rebounded at the start of the 2011 season, jumping to an Italian indoor record of 2.04 m in Banská Bystrica in Slovakia. She continued with her good form in March by winning the European Indoor Championship in Paris with 2.01 m.

=== Records and achievements ===
Her personal best outdoor jump is 2.03 metres, achieved on 24 June 2007, in Milan by surpassing her own previous Italian record of 2.02 m, while her best indoor result came at an indoor high jump meeting in Slovakia on 9 February 2011 with a new national record of 2.04 m. Standing at only 1.69 m, this jump is the unofficial women's world record for the highest jump over her own height (at 35 cm). Di Martino used to be active in heptathlon, achieving a personal best of 5542 points (2001).

=== Missing the 2012 Summer Olympics ===
Di Martino suffered an injury on her knee in April 2012, just four months before the Olympic Games. She was forced to temporarily stop training. However, the National Athletics Federation (FIDAL) underestimate the nature of the injury, which was diagnosed in the three weeks of rehabilitation. But less than a month before the Olympics, they learned that the injury was more serious than expected, forcing her to undergo surgery, ruling her out of London. Her knee surgery was performed just a few days before the race in the Olympics high jump.

Her coach in an interview, accused the FIDAL have underestimated the nature of the injury and failing to ensure an athlete who has contributed immensely to Italian sport the right care at the time of rehabilitation.

== National records ==
- High jump outdoor: 2.03 m ( (Italy) Milan, 24 June 2007 and (Japan) Osaka, 2 September 2007) - current holder
- High jump indoor: 2.04 m ( (Slovakia) Banská Bystrica, 9 February 2009) - current holder

== Achievements ==
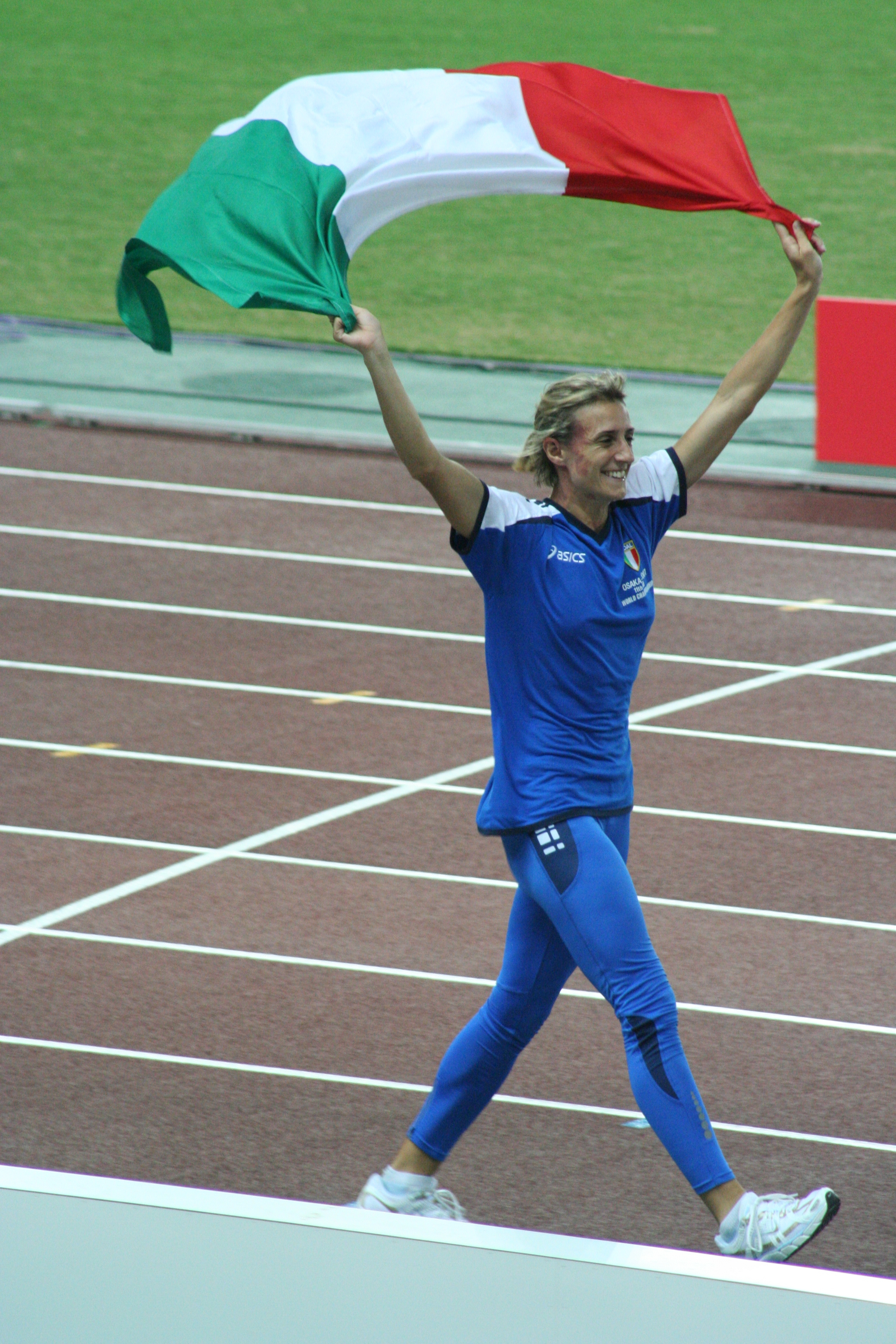
Di Martino celebrates her silver medal at the 2007 World Championships in Osaka

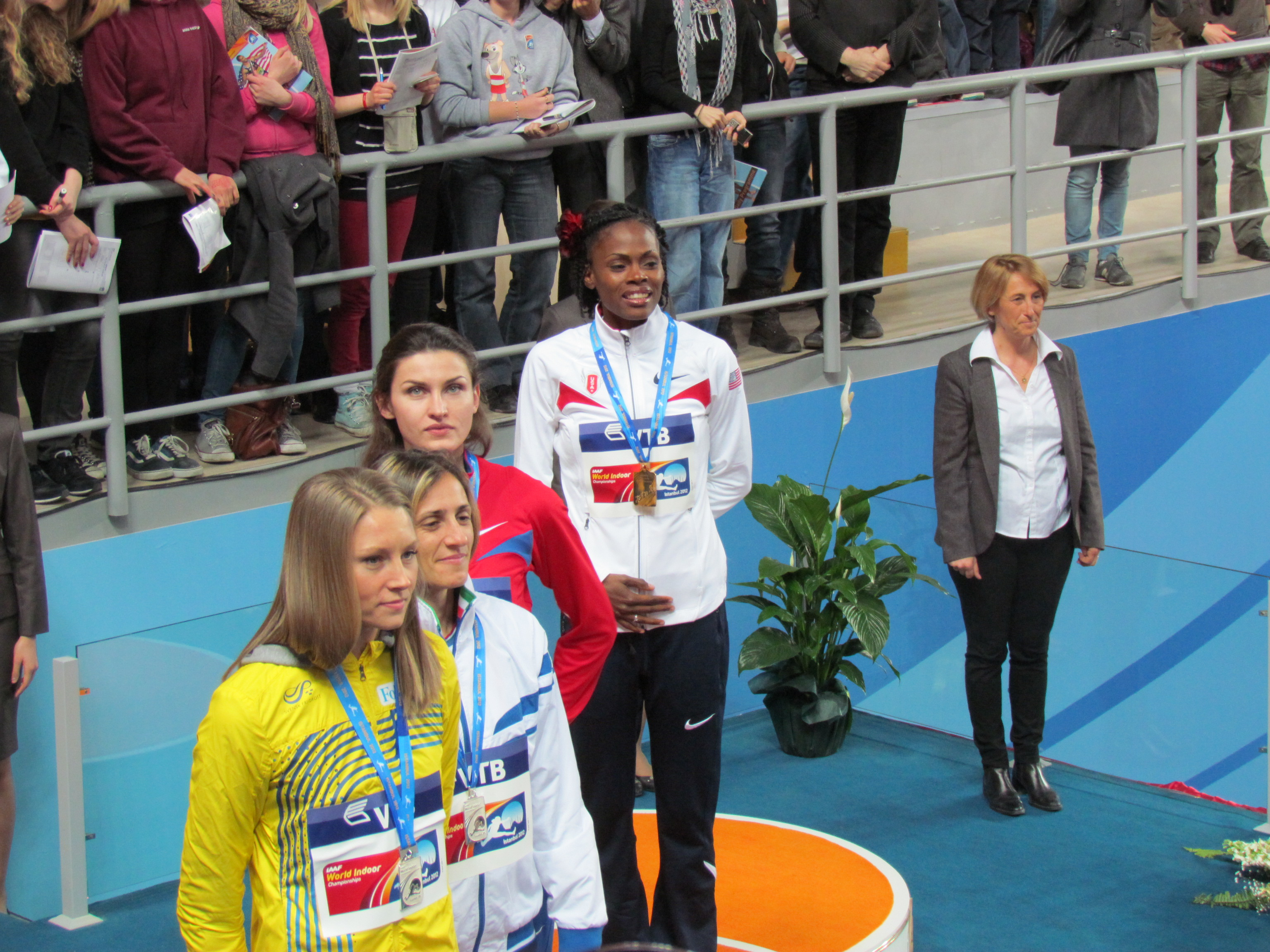
The podium of 2012 World Indoor Championships in Istanbul

Antonietta Di Martino made 12 career jumps over 2.00 m (bolded in the table).

Year	Competition	Venue	Position	Event	Measure	Note
2001	World Championships	Edmonton, Canada	12th	High jump	1,85 m	(Note: She jumped a better measure (1.91 m) in qualify.)
2006	World Indoor Championships	Moscow, Russia	5th	High jump	1,96 m	
2006	European Championships	Gothenburg, Sweden	10th	High jump	1,92 m	
2007	European Indoor Championships	Birmingham, United Kingdom	2nd	High jump	1,96 m	
2007	World Championships	Osaka, Japan	2nd	High jump	**2,03 m**	
2008	World Indoor Championships	Valencia, Spain	10th	High jump	1,93 m	
2008	European Cup	Annecy, France	2nd	High jump	1,95 m	
2008	Olympic Games	Beijing, China	7th	High jump	1.93 m	(Note: After the disqualification of three athletes for doping.)
2009	European Team Championships	Leiria, Portugal	3d	High jump	**2,00 m**	
2009	Mediterranean Games	Pescara, Italy	1st	High jump	1,97 m	
2009	World Championships	Berlin, Germany	3rd	High jump	1,99 m	
2010	European Team Championships	Bergen, Norway	1st	High jump	**2,00 m**	
2010	Diamond League		2nd	High jump		details
2011	European Indoor Championships	Paris, France	1st	High jump	**2,01 m**	
2011	World Championships	Daegu, South Korea	3d	High jump	**2,00 m**	
2012	World Indoor Championships	Istanbul, Turkey	2nd	High jump	1,95 m	

== Other meetings and championships ==
Year	Competition	Venue	Position	Event	Measure	Note
2006	British Grand Prix	Gateshead, United Kingdom	3rd	High jump	1,94 m	
2006	Golden Gala	Rome, Italy	11th	High jump	1,80 m	
2006	Memorial Van Damme	Brussels, Belgium	5th	High jump	1,95 m	
2007	Europa SC High Jump	Banská Bystrica, Slovakia	2nd	High jump	2,00 m	
2007	Memorial Primo Nebiolo	Turin, Italy	1st	High jump	2,02 m	
2007	Bislett Games	Oslo, Norway	6th	High jump	1,90 m	
2007	European Cup (first league)	Milan, Italy	1st	High jump	2,03 m	
2007	IAAF World Athletics Final	Stuttgart, Germany	2nd	High jump	1,97 m	
2009	Golden Gala	Rome, Italy	1st	High jump	2,00 m	
2009	IAAF World Athletics Final	Thessaloniki, Greece	3rd	High jump	1,97 m	
2010	Golden Gala	Rome, Italy	2nd	High jump	1,95 m	
2010	Italian Athletics Championships	Grosseto, Italy	1st	High jump	2,01 m	
2011	Europa SC High Jump	Banská Bystrica, Slovakia	1st	High jump	2,04 m	(Note: She also jumped 2.02 m before in same race.)
2011	Spanish Athletics Championships	Málaga, Spain	1st	High jump	2,00 m	
2011	Rieti Meeting	Rieti, Italy	1st	High jump	1,96 m	

== National championships ==
Antonietta Di Martino has won the individual national championship 10 times.

- 6 wins in High jump outdoor (2000, 2001, 2006, 2007, 2008, 2010)
- 4 wins in High jump indoor (2003, 2006, 2007, 2009)

== Progression ==
Antonietta Di Martino ranked 15 times in the top 25 of the world for the season list. Her 2.04 m indoor is also the 8th best performance of all time.

Outdoor

Year	Performance	Venue	Date	World Rank
2011	2.00	(South Korea) Daegu	3 Sep	3
2011	2.00	(Spain) Málaga	7 Aug	3
2010	2.01	(Italy) Grosseto	30 Jun	4
2009	2.00	(Italy) Rome	10 Jul	6
2009	2.00	(Portugal) Leiria	21 Jun	6
2008	1.97	(Italy) Milan	2 Jul	15
2007	2.03	(Japan) Osaka	2 Sep	2
2007	2.03	(Italy) Milan	24 Jun	2
2006	1.94	(United Kingdom) London	28 Jul	14
2006	1.94	(United Kingdom) Gateshead	11 Jun	
2005	1.90	(Italy) Marano	21 May	
2004	1.86	(Italy) Rome	15 May	
2003	1.90	(Spain) Barcelona	11 Jul	
2002	1.91	(Italy) Desenzano del Garda	11 May	
2001	1.98	(Italy) Catania	7 Jul	8
2000	1.88	(Italy) Matera	20 Sep	

Indoor

Year	Performance	Venue	Date	World Rank
2012	1.95	(Turkey) Istanbul	10 Mar	8
2012	1.95	(Turkey) Istanbul	9 Mar	8
2011	2.04	(Slovakia) Banská Bystrica	9 Feb	1
2009	1.96	(Italy) Turin	21 Feb	8
2008	1.97	(Sweden) Stockholm	21 Feb	12
2007	2.00	(Slovakia) Banská Bystrica	13 Feb	4
2006	1.96	(Russia) Moscow	12 Mar	8
2003	1.96	(United Kingdom) Birmingham	21 Feb	18
2001	1.90	(Italy) Genoa	21 Jan	24

== High Jump Differentials ==
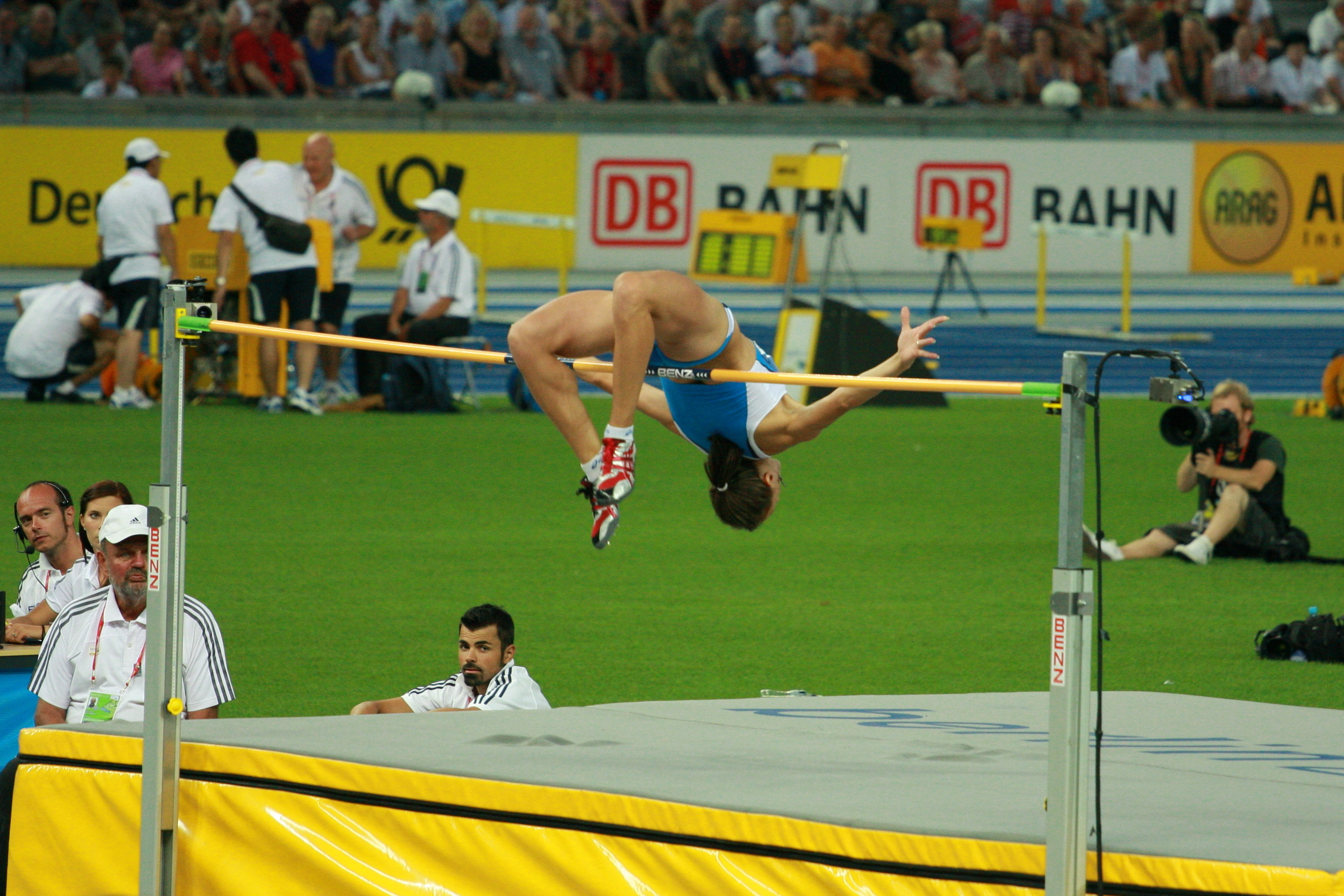
Antonietta Di Martino at the 2009 World Championships high jump final.

All time lists of athletes with the highest recorded jumps above their own height.

	Athlete	Born	Tall	Jump	Year	Diff.
1	(Italy) Antonietta Di Martino	1978	1.69	2.04i	2011	0.35
2	(Sweden) Kajsa Bergqvist	1976	1.75	2.08i	2006	0.33
2	(Greece) Niki Bakoyianni	1968	1.70	2.03	1998	0.33
4	(United States) Yolanda Henry	1964	1.68	2.00i	1990	0.32
4	(Bulgaria) Emilia Dragieva	1965	1.68	2.00i	1987	0.32
6	(France) Marie Collonvillé	1973	1.63	1.94	1997	0.31

== See also ==
- Female two metres club
- Italian all-time top lists - High jump
- Italian records in athletics
- Women's high jump Italian record progression
- Women's high jump winners of Italian Athletics Championships
