= Athletics at the 2008 Summer Olympics – Women's high jump =

Women's high jump at the Games of the XXIX Olympiad
- Venue: Beijing National Stadium
- Dates: 21 August 2008 (qualification); 23 August 2008 (final)
- Competitors: 31 from 24 nations
- Winning height: 2.05

Medalists
1st place, gold medalist(s)		Tia Hellebaut	Belgium
2nd place, silver medalist(s)		Blanka Vlašić	Croatia
3rd place, bronze medalist(s)		Chaunté Howard	United States

The women's high jump at the 2008 Olympic Games took place on 21–23 August at the Beijing Olympic Stadium.

== Summary ==
The qualifying standards were 1.95 m (A standard) and 1.91 m (B standard).

The field was narrowed to four athletes by 2.01m. Blanka Vlašić was in the driver's seat, with a perfect round. Vlašić remained in gold medal position by continuing her perfect round to 2.03m. Anna Chicherova moved into silver position with a first attempt clearance as well. Tia Hellebaut took two attempts to get over the height and was in bronze position. Yelena Slesarenko couldn't get over the height and finished in fourth. After Vlašić missed for the first time in the competition Hellebaut's fortunes reversed with a first attempt clearance of 2.05 m (6 ft 8 1/2 in), leapfrogging her into the lead. Vlašić cleared on her second attempt, while Chicherova ended her competition with three straight misses. The bar was moved up to an Olympic record 2.07m, just 2cm below the world record. Neither competitor could get over 2.07m.

Eight years after the competition, samples taken after the event were retested. Chicherova tested positive for dehydrochlormethyltestosterone (turinabol). The fourth- and fifth-place finishers, Yelena Slesarenko and Vita Palamar also tested positive in the 2016 re-tests. All three were disqualified from the Olympics, and their results were struck from the record. Medals of other athletes have been reallocated by IAAF.

== Records ==
Prior to this competition, the existing world record, Olympic record, and world leading jump were as follows:

World record	Stefka Kostadinova (BUL)	2.09	Rome, Italy	30 August 1987
Olympic record	Yelena Slesarenko (RUS)	2.06	Athens, Greece	28 August 2004
World Leading	Blanka Vlašić (CRO) (2)	2.06	Istanbul, Turkey; Madrid, Spain	22 June 2008; 5 July 2008

No new world or Olympic records were set for this event.

== Results ==
=== Qualifying round ===
Qualification criteria: 1.96 (Q) or at least 12 best performers (q) advance to the final.

Rank	Group	Name	Nationality	1.80	1.85	1.89	1.93	Result	Notes
1	B	Marina Aitova	Kazakhstan	o	o	o	o	1.93	q
1	B	Ruth Beitia	Spain	o	o	o	o	1.93	q
1	A	Tia Hellebaut	Belgium	-	o	o	o	1.93	q
1	B	Vita Styopina	Ukraine	o	o	o	o	1.93	q
5	B	Antonietta Di Martino	Italy	xo	o	o	o	1.93	q
5	A	Ariane Friedrich	Germany	-	o	xo	o	1.93	q
7	B	Iva Straková	Czech Republic	o	o	xxo	o	1.93	q
8	B	Chaunté Howard	United States	o	o	o	xo	1.93	q
8	A	Svetlana Shkolina	Russia	o	o	o	xo	1.93	q
8	B	Blanka Vlašić	Croatia	o	o	o	xo	1.93	q
11	B	Emma Green	Sweden	o	o	o	xxo	1.93	q
12	A	Romana Dubnová	Czech Republic	o	xo	o	xxo	1.93	q
13	A	Doreen Amata	Nigeria	o	o	o	xxx	1.89	
13	B	Melanie Skotnik	France	o	o	o	xxx	1.89	
15	A	Svetlana Radzivil	Uzbekistan	o	xo	o	xxx	1.89	
16	A	Amy Acuff	United States	o	o	xo	xxx	1.89	
16	B	Nicole Forrester	Canada	o	o	xo	xxx	1.89	
18	B	Anna Iljustsenko	Estonia	o	xxo	xo	xxx	1.89	
19	A	Xingjuan Zheng	China	xo	o	xxo	xxx	1.89	
20	A	Karina Vnukova	Lithuania	o	o	xxx		1.85	
21	A	Sharon Day	United States	xo	o	xxx		1.85	
22	A	Antonia Stergiou	Greece	xo	o	xxx		1.85	
23	B	Nadiya Dusanova	Uzbekistan	xxo	o	xxx		1.85	
24	B	Levern Spencer	Saint Lucia	-	xo	xxx		1.85	
25	A	Yekaterina Yevseyeva	Kazakhstan	o	xxo	xxx		1.85	
26	A	Noeng-Ruthai Chaipech	Thailand	o	xxx			1.80	
26	A	Inna Gliznuta	Moldova	o	xxx			1.80	
	B	Tatiana Efimenko	Kyrgyzstan	xxx				NM	
	B	Romary Rifka	Mexico	xxx				NM	
DQ (8th)	A	Vita Palamar	Ukraine	-	o	o	xo	~~1.93~~	q
DQ (12th)	A	Anna Chicherova	Russia	o	o	xo	xo	~~1.93~~	q
DQ (14th)	B	Yelena Slesarenko	Russia	o	o	xo	xxo	~~1.93~~	q

NM - No Mark

=== Final ===
Rank	Name	Nationality	1.85	1.89	1.93	1.96	1.99	2.01	2.03	2.05	2.07	Height	Notes
1st place, gold medalist(s)	Tia Hellebaut	Belgium	o	o	o	o	xo	xo	xo	o	x--	2.05	NR
2nd place, silver medalist(s)	Blanka Vlašić	Croatia	o	o	o	o	o	o	o	xo	xxx	2.05	
3rd place, bronze medalist(s)	Chaunté Howard	United States	o	o	xo	xo	xxo	xxx				1.99	SB
4	Ariane Friedrich	Germany	o	-	o	o	xxx					1.96	
4	Ruth Beitia	Spain	o	o	o	o	xxx					1.96	
6	Emma Green	Sweden	o	o	o	xxo	xxx					1.96	SB
7	Marina Aitova	Kazakhstan	o	o	o	xxx						1.93	
7	Antonietta Di Martino	Italy	o	o	o	xxx						1.93	
9	Iva Straková	Czech Republic	o	o	xxo	xxx						1.93	
9	Vita Styopina	Ukraine	o	o	xxo	xxx						1.93	
11	Svetlana Shkolina	Russia	o	xo	xxo	xxx						1.93	
12	Romana Dubnová	Czech Republic	o	xo	x-							1.89	
DQ (3rd)	Anna Chicherova	Russia	o	o	o	xo	xxo	o	o	xxx		~~2.03~~	
DQ (4th)	Yelena Slesarenko	Russia	o	o	xo	xo	xo	xo	xxx			~~2.01~~	
DQ (5th)	Vita Palamar	Ukraine	o	o	o	xo	xo	xx-	x			~~1.99~~	

NR = National Record / PB = Personal Best / SB = Season Best
