= Yelena Slesarenko =

Russian high jumper

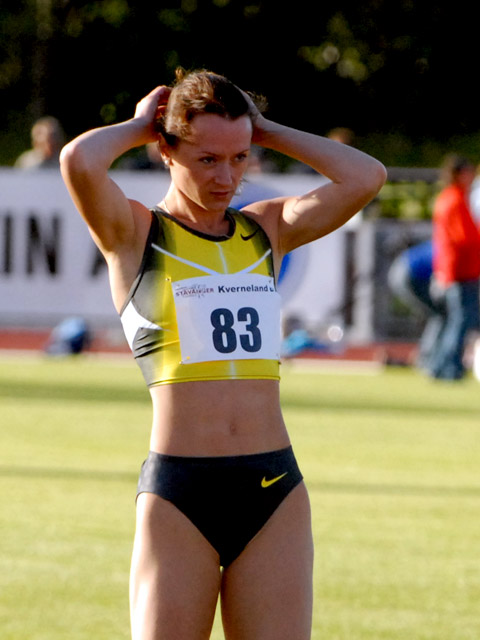
- In 2007

Personal information
- Nationality: Russia
- Born: February 28, 1982 (age 44) Volgograd, Russian SFSR, Soviet Union
- Height: 1.79 m (5 ft 10 1/2 in)
- Weight: 54 kg (119 lb)

Sport
- Country: Russia

Achievements and titles
- Olympic finals: 1st (Athens, 2004)
- Highest world ranking: 1st (Budapest, 2004)
- Personal bests: High jump (outdoor): 2.06 m (2004); High jump (indoor): 2.04 m (2004)
Medal record
Olympics
Gold medal – first place	2004 Athens	High jump
World Indoor Championships
Gold medal – first place	2004 Budapest	High jump
Gold medal – first place	2006 Moscow	High jump
Silver medal – second place	2008 Valencia	High jump

Yelena Vladimirovna Slesarenko, née Sivushenko (Russian: Елена Владимировна Слесаренко; born February 28, 1982, in Volgograd) is a Russian high jumper.

In 2004 she cleared 2.04 metres to win the World Indoor Championships. Outdoors that year she won the SPAR European Cup with the same height. At the 2004 Summer Olympics, she won the gold medal with a new national record 2.06 metres, beating the previous Olympic record, set by Stefka Kostadinova in 1996. She finished the season by winning the World Athletics Final.

Injuries kept her away from most of the 2005 season, including the 2005 World Championships.

In 2006 she won the World Indoor Championships with 2.02 metres. She finished fifth in the 2006 European Athletics Championships, failing to clear 2.00 m.

At the 2008 Beijing Summer Olympics, Slesarenko finished fourth in the women's high jump with a jump of 2.01 meters. However, in 2016 both she and her compatriot, bronze-medalist Anna Chicherova, were disqualified from this event after failing a retest of drug samples from Beijing.

Slesarenko retired in 2014. I 2022 she was disqualified for doping and her results were cancelled from 2008 onward, although she retained her 2004 Olympic gold medal. She later became a director of a winter sports academy in Volgograd, her home city.

== International competitions ==
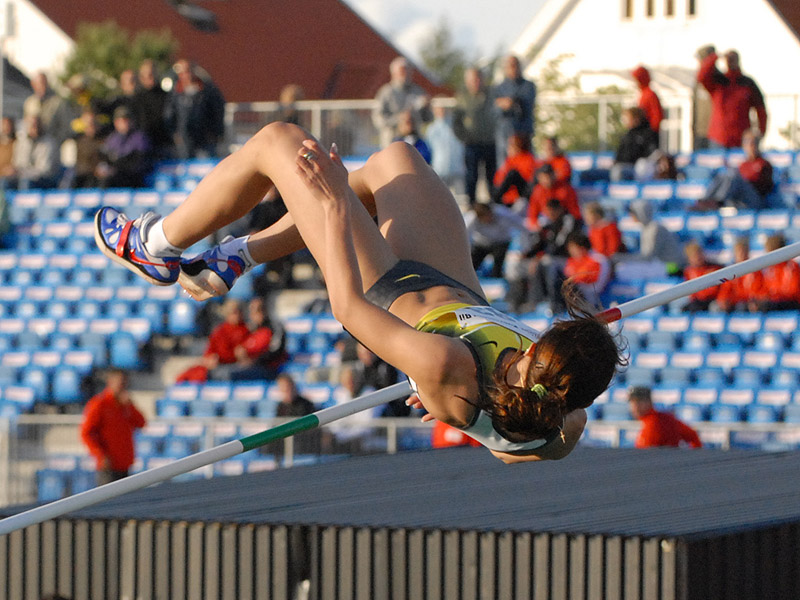
Yelena Slesarenko in 2007.

Representing Russia
Year	Competition	Venue	Position	Result	Notes
2002	European Indoor Championships	Vienna, Austria	5th	1.90 m	
2003	European U23 Championships	Bydgoszcz, Poland	2nd	1.96 m	SB
2003	Universiade	Daegu, South Korea	3rd	1.94 m	
2004	World Indoor Championships	Budapest, Hungary	1st	2.04 m	NR
2004	Olympic Games	Athens, Greece	1st	2.06 m	OR
2004	World Athletics Final	Monte Carlo, Monaco	1st	2.01 m	
2006	World Indoor Championships	Moscow, Russia	1st	2.02 m	SB
2006	European Championships	Gothenburg, Sweden	5th	1.99 m	
2006	World Athletics Final	Stuttgart, Germany	4th	1.94 m	
2006	World Cup	Athens, Greece	1st	1.97 m	
2007	World Championships	Osaka, Japan	4th	2.00 m	
2007	World Athletics Final	Stuttgart, Germany	4th	1.94 m	
2008	World Indoor Championships	Valencia, Spain	2nd	2.01 m	
2008	Olympic Games	Beijing, China	—	2.01 m	DQ (4th)
2008	World Athletics Final	Stuttgart, Germany	—	1.94 m	DQ (6th)
2009	World Championships	Berlin, Germany	—	1.92 m	DQ (9th)
2011	World Championships	Daegu, South Korea	—	1.97 m	DQ (4th)
2011	DécaNation	Nice, France	1st	1.95 m	

== See also ==
- List of doping cases in athletics
- List of Olympic medalists in athletics (women)
- List of 2004 Summer Olympics medal winners
- List of IAAF World Indoor Championships medalists (women)
- List of high jump national champions (women)
- List of Russian sportspeople
- List of people from Volgograd
- Doping at the Olympic Games
- High jump at the Olympics

Sporting positions
Preceded by Kajsa Bergqvist; Hestrie Cloete	Women's High Jump Best Year Performance; 2004	Succeeded by Kajsa Bergqvist
