= Amy Acuff =

American track and field athlete

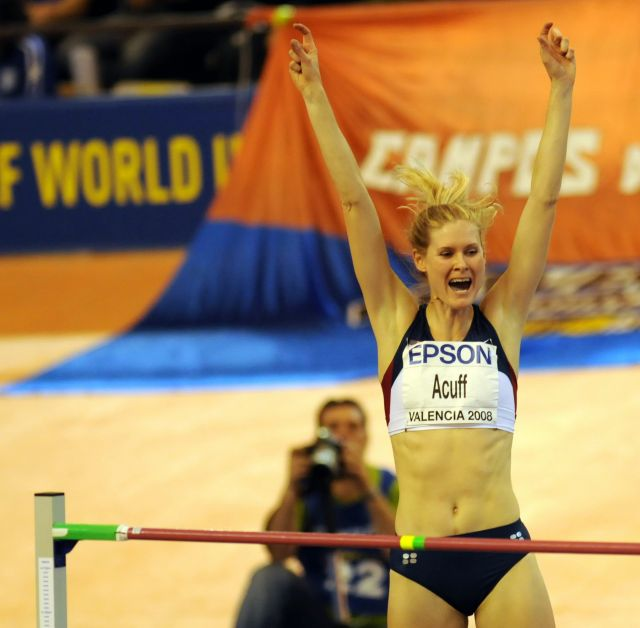
- Acuff at the 2008 World Indoor Championships

Personal information
- Full name: Amy Lyn Acuff
- Born: July 14, 1975 (age 51) Port Arthur, Texas, U.S.A.
- Height: 6 ft 2 in (1.88 m)
- Weight: 145 lb (66 kg)

Sport
- Country: United States
- Sport: Track and field
- Event: High jump
- Club: UCLA Bruins
- Team: USA Track & Field
Medal record
Women's athletics
Representing United States
World University Games
| Gold medal – first place | 1997 Sicily | High jump |
World Junior Championships
| Bronze medal – third place | 1994 Lisbon | High jump |

Amelia Lyn "Amy" Acuff (born July 14, 1975) is a track and field athlete from the United States. A high jump specialist, she competed in the 1996, 2000, 2004, 2008 and 2012 Olympic Games as a member of USA Track and Field. Her best Olympic performance came at the 2004 Games, where her jump of 1.99 m earned her fourth place in the final.

== Biography ==
Born in Port Arthur, Texas, she established herself domestically with wins at the USA Outdoor Track and Field Championships in 1995 and 1997. At the age of 22, she became the Universiade champion, edging out Monica Iagăr in the 1997 high jump final. Acuff was the winner of the 1998 Hochsprung mit Musik meeting in Arnstadt, Germany, becoming the first non-European winner in the history of the event. She went on to win at the national championships in 2001, 2003, 2005 and 2007. Six national championships, all in odd numbered years.

Her personal best is 2.01 m, which she achieved at the Weltklasse Golden League international track and field meet in Zürich, Switzerland, on August 15, 2003. She finished 4th place at that high jump competition.

During the 2004 Olympic final, she was in bronze medal position through 1.99m. At 2.02m, after Vita Styopina cleared her lifetime personal best on her first attempt, Acuff strategically chose to pass at what would have been her personal best just to equal Styopina and retain bronze medal position. At the time, American television commentator Dwight Stones said "That is a decision she will think about the rest of her life."

While in high school in 1993 she was named the national Girl's "High School Athlete of the Year" by Track and Field News.

Her 1.95m at the Texas Relays at age 36 on March 31, 2012, should qualify as the W35 American Masters record.

Just 17 days before her 40th birthday, on June 28, 2015, Acuff placed third at the USATF track championships in Eugene, Oregon, potentially qualifying her for 2015's US delegation to the world championships in Beijing, however she needed jump of 1.94 meters, the qualifying standard. She, and all of the other American women, were ultimately unable to meet this standard and could not compete in Beijing.

She was Inducted into the Texas Track and Field Coaches Hall of Fame, Class of 2015.

== Personal bests ==
- High jump (outdoors): 2.01 m (6 ft 7 in) - Zurich, August 15, 2003
- High jump (indoors): 1.97 m (6 ft 5 1/2 in) - Indianapolis, March 11, 1995

== National titles ==
- National Scholastic Indoor Champion: 1991, 1992
- NCAA (National Collegiate) Indoor Champion: 1994, 1995, 1997
- NCAA Outdoor Champion: 1995, 1996
- 6 Time U.S. Outdoor Champion: 1995, 1997, 2001, 2003, 2005, 2007
- 5 Time U.S. Indoor Champion: 2001, 2004, 2007, 2008, 2009

== International competitions ==
| Year | Competition | Venue | Position | Notes |
Representing the United States
| 1992 | World Junior Championships | Seoul, South Korea | 9th | 1.85 m |
| 1993 | Pan American Junior Championships | Winnipeg, Canada | 1st | 1.83 m |
| 1994 | World Junior Championships | Lisbon, Portugal | 3rd | 1.88 m |
| 1995 | World Championships | Gothenburg, Sweden | 8th | 1.93 m |
| 1996 | Olympic Games | Atlanta, United States | 24th (q) | 1.85 m |
| 1997 | World University Games | Sicily, Italy | 1st | 1.98 m |
| 1997 | World Championships | Athens, Greece | 14th (q) | 1.92 m |
| 1997 | IAAF Grand Prix Final | Fukuoka, Japan | 6th | 1.93 m |
| 1999 | World Championships | Seville, Spain | 9th | 1.93 m |
| 2000 | Olympic Games | Sydney, Australia | 31st (q) | 1.80 m |
| 2001 | World Indoor Championships | Lisbon, Portugal | 4th | 1.96 m |
| 2001 | World Championships | Edmonton, Alberta, Canada | 10th | 1.90 m |
| 2001 | IAAF Grand Prix Final | Melbourne, Australia | 2nd | 1.96 m |
| 2003 | World Indoor Championships | Birmingham, United Kingdom | 10th | 1.92 m |
| 2003 | World Championships | Paris, France | 9th | 1.90 m |
| 2004 | Olympic Games | Athens, Greece | 4th | 1.99 m |
| 2004 | IAAF World Athletics Final | Monaco | 6th | 1.95 m |
| 2005 | World Championships | Helsinki, Finland | 8th | 1.89 m |
| 2006 | World Indoor Championships | Moscow, Russia | 13th (q) | 1.90 m |
| 2006 | IAAF World Athletics Final | Stuttgart, Germany | 5th | 1.94 m |
| 2006 | World Cup | Athens, Greece | 3rd | 1.94 m |
| 2007 | World Championships | Osaka, Japan | 12th | 1.94 m |
| 2007 | IAAF World Athletics Final | Stuttgart, Germany | 5th | 1.94 m |
| 2008 | World Indoor Championships | Valencia, Spain | 6th | 1.95 m |
| 2008 | Olympic Games | Beijing, China | 19th (q) | 1.89 m |
| 2009 | World Championships | Berlin, Germany | 10th | 1.87 m |
| 2012 | Olympic Games | London, United Kingdom | 20th (q) | 1.85 m |

- Results with a Q indicate Acuff's overall position in the qualifying round.

== Modeling ==
Amy Acuff is also known for her career as a model. She was the subject of modeling projects, media stories, and photography relating to her sports career as a track and field athlete. Acuff was even featured on national television commercials. A new challenge was taken in 1999 as she successfully organized the making of the 2000 Omnilite Millennium Calendar of Champions, which featured nude/semi-nude photographs of Acuff and 11 other U.S. female track and field stars, with half the proceeds going to the Florence Griffith-Joyner Youth Foundation.

Acuff's cover appearances include:

- Esquire, "Women of Summer: Strength & Beauty: A Portfolio of America's 10 Sexiest Athletes"
- Men's magazines, such as Maxim and FHM
- The 2004 Olympics were noted for the large number of female Olympians who posed nude—following in the footsteps of the 2000 Matildas and the Omni calendar. Of the 2004 examples the most visible was Acuff's appearance on the cover and within Playboy's "The Women of the Olympics" issue.
- Acuff appears across the top of the title for The Complete Book of the Olympics: 2008 Edition.

== Personal life ==
Acuff graduated from Calallen High School in Corpus Christi, Texas. She attended UCLA and was inducted into the UCLA Athletics Hall of Fame in 2007. Acuff went on to study at the Academy of Oriental Medicine in Austin, Texas, and become a licensed acupuncturist.

She is distantly related to country musician Roy Acuff (her grandfather's second cousin).

She is married to Tye Harvey, a retired pole vaulter. They have a daughter, Elsa.

In addition to being a model, Acuff is also an artist with work on display with the Art of the Olympians.

Sporting positions
| Preceded by Angela Bradburn; Tisha Waller; Karol Damon; Tisha Waller; Tisha Waller | USA Women's High Jump Champion; 1995; 1997; 2001; 2003; 2005 | Succeeded by Tisha Waller; Tisha Waller; Tisha Waller; Tisha Waller; Chaunte Howard |
