= Monica Iagăr =

Romanian athlete and politician

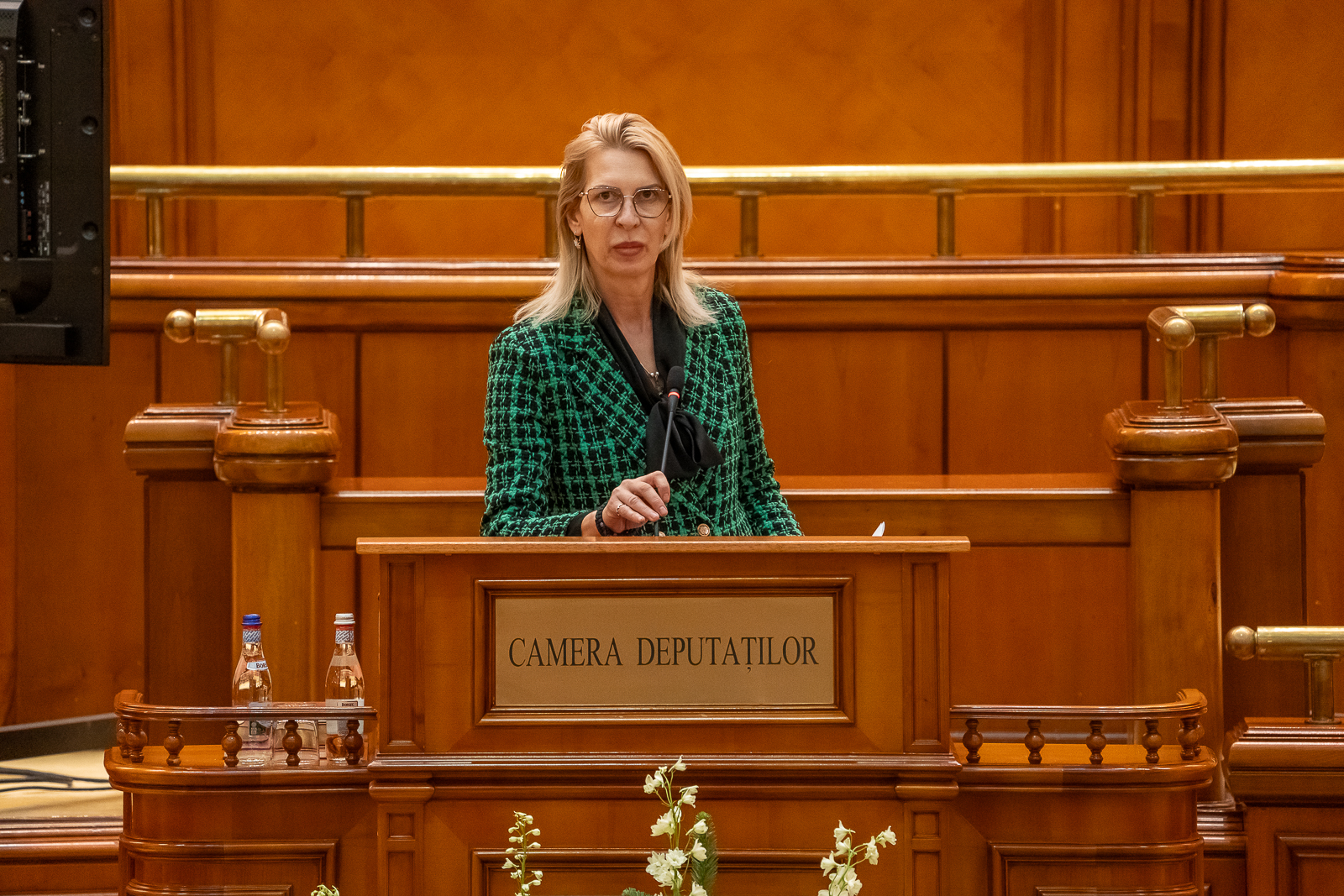
- Iagăr taking the oath of office on 21 December 2024

Member of the Chamber of Deputies
- Incumbent
- Assumed office 21 December 2024
- Sports career
Medal record
Women's athletics
Representing Romania
European Championships
| Gold medal – first place | 1998 Budapest | High jump |
European Indoor Championships
| Gold medal – first place | 1998 Valencia | High jump |
Summer Universiade
| Gold medal – first place | 1999 Palma de Mallorca | High jump |
| Silver medal – second place | 1997 Catania | High jump |

Monica Iagăr (born 2 April 1973) is a Romanian politician and former athlete who competed in high jump. Her personal best jump is 2.02 metres. In 2024, she was elected a member of the Chamber of Deputies for the Alliance for the Union of Romanians.

She made her international debut in high jump in 1995 but went through a six-month suspension in 1996. In 1998 she won the European Indoor Athletics Championship with 1.96 m and outdoor European Championships with 1.97 m. She also won the 1999 Summer Universiade and also won the Hochsprung mit Musik meet that year. She finished 8th at the 2004 Summer Olympics.

== Political career ==
=== Member of the Chamber of Deputies (2024–present) ===
In the 2024 Romanian parliamentary election on 1 December, Iagăr was elected a member of the Champer of Deputies for the Alliance for the Union of Romanians party in Satu Mare County, taking office on 21 December.

== See also ==
- List of sportspeople sanctioned for doping offences

Sporting positions
| Preceded by (South Africa) Hestrie Cloete | Women's High Jump Best Year Performance; 2000 | Succeeded by (Bulgaria) Venelina Veneva |
