= Tia Hellebaut =

Belgian track and field athlete (born 1978)

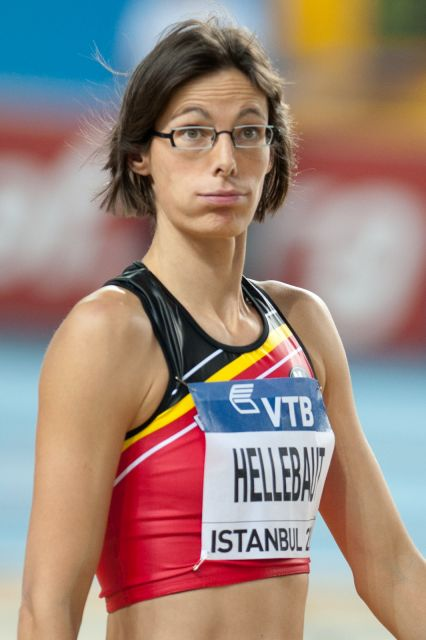
- Hellebaut in 2012

Personal information
- Born: 16 February 1978 (age 48) Antwerp, Belgium
- Height: 1.82 m (6 ft 0 in)
- Weight: 62 kg (137 lb)

Sport
- Country: Belgium
- Now coaching: Wim Vandeven

Achievements and titles
- Olympic finals: 1st (Beijing, 2008)
- Personal bests: High jump (outdoor & indoor): 2.05 m
Medal record
Representing Belgium
Olympic Games
Gold medal – first place	2008 Beijing	High jump
World Indoor Championships
Gold medal – first place	2008 Valencia	Pentathlon
European Championships
Gold medal – first place	2006 Gothenburg	High jump
European Indoor Championships
Gold medal – first place	2007 Birmingham	High jump
World Athletics Final
Silver medal – second place	2006 Stuttgart	High jump
Bronze medal – third place	2008 Stuttgart	High jump
- Updated on 28 July 2022

Tia Hellebaut (Dutch pronunciation: [ˈtijaː ˈɦɛləbʌut]; born 16 February 1978) is a Belgian former track and field athlete. She started out in her sports career in the heptathlon, and afterwards specialized in the high jump event. She has cleared 2.05 metres both indoors and outdoors.

Hellebaut was the 2008 Olympic champion in the high jump. She was previously the European Champion in 2006 and then the European Indoor Champion in 2007. She won the gold medal in the pentathlon at the 2008 IAAF World Indoor Championships. In addition to these medals, she has participated at the World Championships in Athletics on four occasions.

She held the Belgian records indoor long jump and indoor pentathlon until they were broken by Nafissatou Thiam and still holds the Belgian record in both indoors and outdoors high jump.

== Career ==
Hellebaut worked as a chemist from 1996 to 1999. She started her career as a professional athlete with Atletiek Vlaanderen from 2001 to October 2005. From 1 November 2006 she again became a professional athlete, this time at Bloso. During her most successful period, Hellebaut was trained by her partner, Wim Vandeven, at her club, Atletica 84.

At the 2006 European Championships and 2007 Indoor European Championships Hellebaut won the gold medal in high jump. The 2006 victory became especially notable, when just a couple of minutes later her close friend and compatriot Kim Gevaert completed a historical sprint double. The images of both athletes celebrating their victory together, wrapped in a national flag, became part of Belgian sports history.

In 2007 Hellebaut set the then fourth best pentathlon score of all time, but chose not to contest the European Indoor Championships because of illness, choosing instead to compete only in the high jump, which she later won. Most of the remainder of her 2007 high jump season was hampered by an ankle injury. A shoulder injury, which made it difficult for her to throw the javelin, ended her career in heptathlon around this time.

For the 2008 indoor season, Hellebaut returned her focus to multi-events and became world champion of pentathlon at the World Indoor Championships in Valencia, where she set a record for the best high jump result in a women's multi-event competition, clearing 1.99 m.

At the 2008 Summer Olympics, held in Beijing, Hellebaut reached her pinnacle thus far by winning the gold medal in the high jump, ahead of the favorite, Blanka Vlašić of Croatia, with a new outdoor personal best of 2.05 m. Her achievement represented the first-ever athletics gold medal in the Olympics for a Belgian woman, and only the second of any color, one day after Belgium won their first (silver) medal in the 4 × 100 m relay (which later was upgraded to gold after the Russian team was disqualified because of a doping rules infraction by one of their athletes).

=== Retirement and comebacks ===
On 5 December 2008 Hellebaut announced her pregnancy and retirement from professional athletics and that she would start working for a sports marketing company. The following year, on 9 June, her daughter Lotte was born.

Inspired by fellow Belgian Kim Clijsters' comeback to the WTA as a young mother, she unexpectedly announced her return to athletics on 16 February 2010, her 32nd birthday. Hellebaut also announced that she would be concentrating exclusively on the high jump and aimed to participate in the 2012 Summer Olympics.

Shortly after placing fifth at the 2010 European Athletic Championships in Barcelona by clearing 1.97 metres, her first major championships after her comeback, it was reported that Hellebaut was pregnant again. During a press conference on 17 August she confirmed that she had been pregnant for three months already, and that this had been a conscious choice. Although Hellebaut did not participate in any further 2010 events, she never officially announced that the new pregnancy would definitively end her career.

On 16 June 2011, 4 months after the birth of her second daughter Saartje, Hellebaut announced her second return, confirming that she aimed to defend her title at the London Games. She was Team Belgium national flag bearer at the 2012 Summer Olympics Parade of Nations. She ended fifth in the high jump competition.

On 6 March 2013, after the European Indoor Championships in Gothenburg, she announced her second retirement, saying that she could no longer challenge herself mentally in competition.

== Sport consultancy ==
In March 2019, Belgian football club Beerschot Wilrijk announced the take-over of amateur side Rupel Boom and lifetime Beerschot supporter Hellebaut was appointed advisor at Rupel Boom's football academy.

== Awards and honours ==
- Belgian National Sports Merit Award: 2006 (with Kim Gevaert)
- Golden Spike - Best female athlete: 2006, 2008, 2012
- Flemish Sportsjewel: 2006
- Vlaamse Reus: 2008
- Belgian Sportswoman of the Year: 2008
- Belgian Sports Personality of the Year: 2008
- Honorary Citizen of Tessenderlo: 2008
- Dame Grand Cross of the Order of the Crown, by Royal Decree of H.M. King Albert II: 2009
- World Sports Legends Award: 2016

== International achievements ==
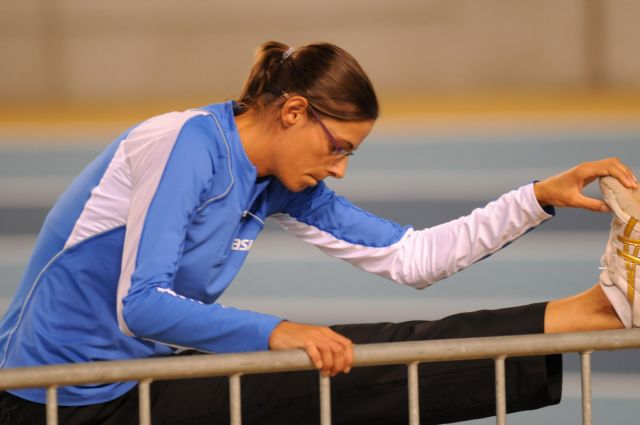
Hellebaut warming up before competing (2008)

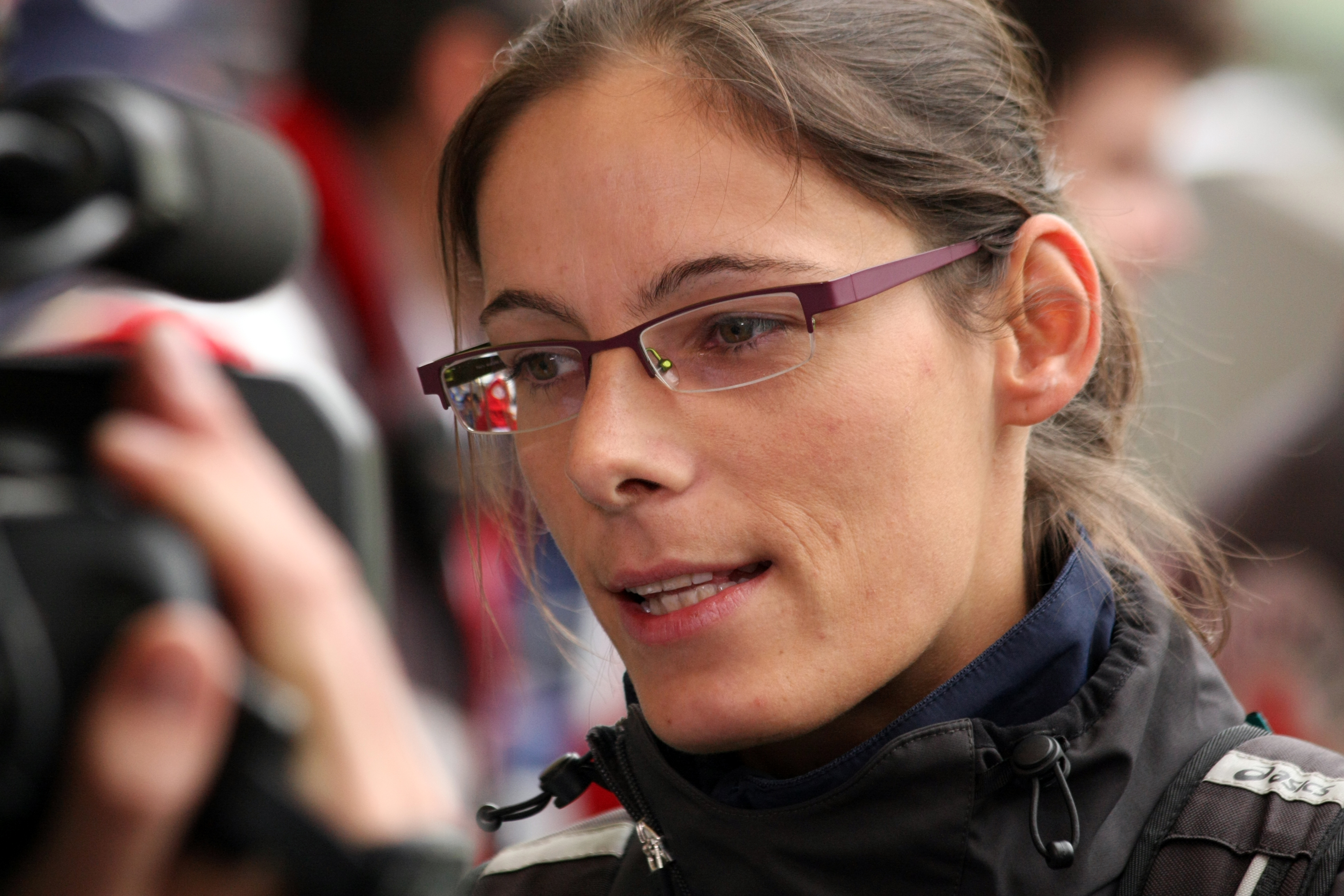
Hellebaut at the 2008 IAAF World Athletics Final

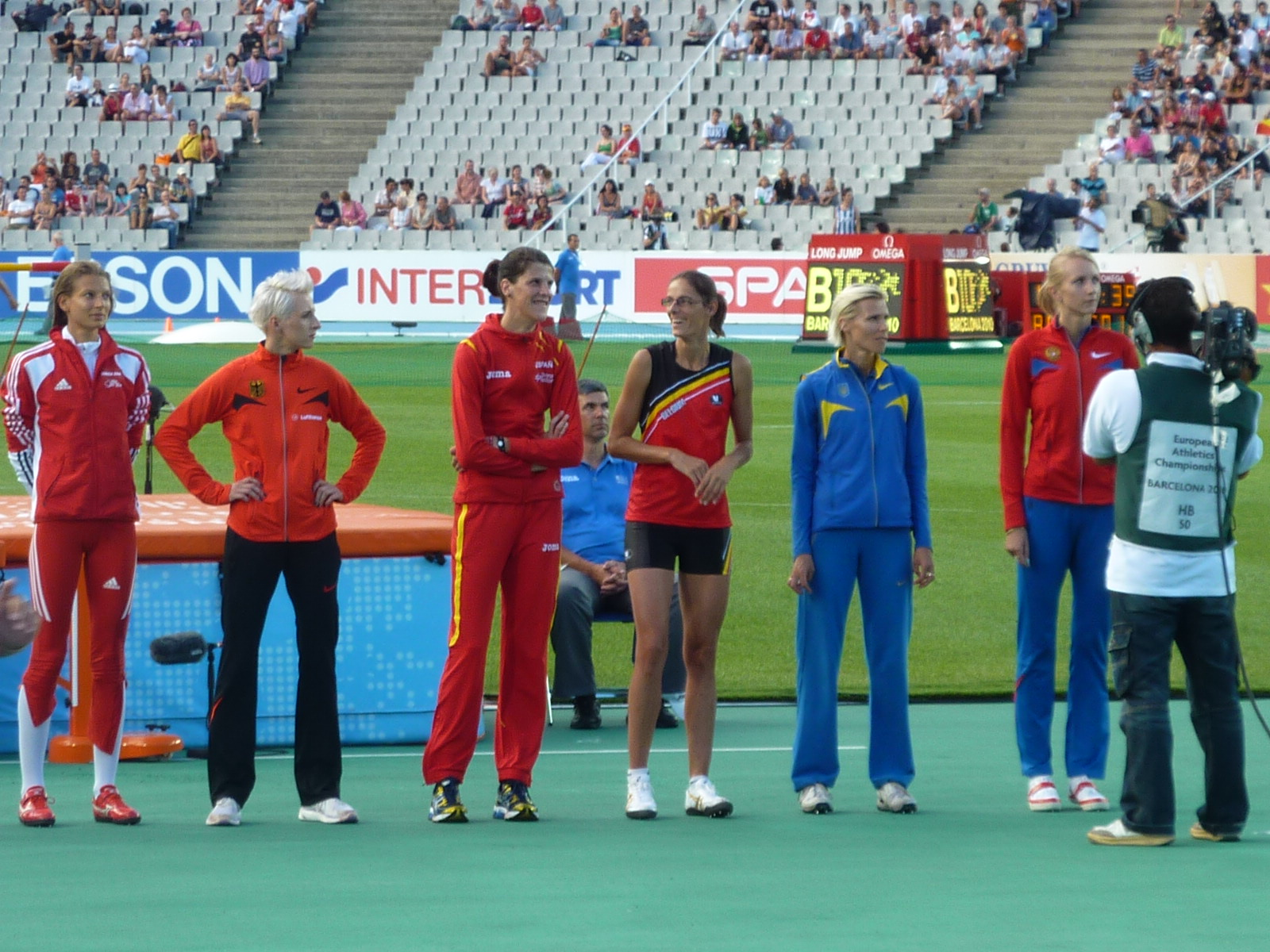
Hellebaut (centre) preparing for the 2010 European Final

Year	Competition	Venue	Position	Event	Notes
Representing Belgium
1995	European Youth Olympic Festival	Bath, United Kingdom	9th	High jump	1.75 m
1997	European Junior Championships	Ljubljana, Slovenia	11th	Heptathlon	5157 pts
1999	Universiade	Palma, Spain	14th (q)	High jump	1.80 m
1999	European U23 Championships	Gothenburg, Sweden	6th	Heptathlon	5548 pts
2000	European Indoor Championships	Ghent, Belgium	—	Pentathlon	DNF
2001	World Championships	Edmonton, Canada	14th	Heptathlon	5680 pts
2003	World Championships	Paris, France	—	Heptathlon	DNF
2004	World Indoor Championships	Budapest, Hungary	5th	Pentathlon	4526 pts
2004	Olympic Games	Athens, Greece	12th	High jump	1.85 m (o)
2005	World Championships	Helsinki, Finland	6th	High jump	1.93 m
2006	World Championships Indoor	Moscow, Russia	6th	High jump	1.96 m (xo)
2006	European Championships	Gothenburg, Sweden	1st	High jump	2.03 m (o)
2006	World Athletics Final	Stuttgart, Germany	2nd	High jump	1.98 m
2006	IAAF World Cup	Athens, Greece	2nd	High jump	1.97 m
2007	European Indoor Championships	Birmingham, England	1st	High jump	2.05 m (o)
2007	World Championships	Osaka, Japan	14th	High jump	1.90 m (xo)
2008	World Indoor Championships	Valencia, Spain	1st	Pentathlon	4867 pts
2008	Olympic Games	Beijing, China	1st	High jump	2.05 m (o)
2008	World Athletics Final	Stuttgart, Germany	3rd	High jump	1.97 m
2010	European Championships	Barcelona, Spain	5th	High jump	1.97 m (xxo)
2012	World Indoor Championships	Istanbul, Turkey	5th	High jump	1.95 m (o)
2012	Olympic Games	London, United Kingdom	4th	High jump	1.97 m (o)
2013	European Indoor Championships	Gothenburg, Sweden	8th	High jump	1.87 m (xo)

== Statistics ==
Personal records
Event	Result	Year	Extra
100 metres hurdles	13.91 seconds	2006	
60 metres hurdles	8.50 seconds	2006	
Triple jump	13.05 metres	2001	
Shot put	13.85 metres	2008	
Javelin throw	44.37 metres	2001	
200 metres	24.65 seconds	2006	
800 metres	2:14.75 seconds	2006	
Long jump (indoor)	6.42 metres	2007	NR
Long jump (outdoor)	6.44 metres	2007	
High jump (indoor)	2.05 metres	2007	NR
High jump (outdoor)	2.05 metres	2008	NR
Heptathlon	6201 points	2006	
Pentathlon	4877 points	2007	NR

Belgian record marks
Event	Result	Year	Location
Pentathlon indoor	4268 points	17 February 1999	Ghent, Belgium
Pentathlon indoor	4436 points	25 February 2001	Ghent, Belgium
Pentathlon indoor	4560 points	1 February 2004	Zuidbroek, the Netherlands
Pentathlon indoor	4589 points	21 February 2004	Aubière, France
Pentathlon indoor	4877 points	11 February 2007	Ghent, Belgium
High jump (outdoor)	1.95 metres	20 June 2004	Plovdiv, Bulgaria
High jump (outdoor)	1.95 metres	27 August 2004	Athens, Greece
High jump (outdoor)	1.98 metres	2 June 2006	Oslo, Norway
High jump (outdoor)	2.00 metres	8 July 2006	Paris, France
High jump (outdoor)	2.00 metres	15 July 2006	Rome, Italy
High jump (outdoor)	2.01 metres	11 August 2006	Gothenburg, Sweden
High jump (outdoor)	2.03 metres	11 August 2006	Gothenburg, Sweden
High jump (outdoor)	2.05 metres	23 August 2008	Beijing, China
Long jump indoor	6.36 metres	19 February 2006	Ghent, Belgium
Long jump indoor	6.42 metres	11 February 2007	Ghent, Belgium
High jump indoor	1.96 metres	26 February 2006	Ghent, Belgium
High jump indoor	1.97 metres	28 February 2006	Tallinn, Estonia
High jump indoor	2.00 metres	27 January 2007	Brussels, Belgium
High jump indoor	2.05 metres	3 March 2007	Birmingham, England
Heptathlon outdoor	6201 points	28 May 2006	Götzis, Austria

Olympic Games
Preceded by Sébastien Godefroid	Flagbearer for Belgium; London 2012	Succeeded by Olivia Borlée

Preceded by Justine Henin	Belgian Sports Personality of the Year; 2008	Succeeded by Incumbent
