= Iryna Kovalenko =

Ukrainian high jumper (born 1986)

Personal information
- Full name: Iryna Vyacheslavivna Kovalenko
- Born: 12 June 1986 (age 40) Bila Tserkva, Ukrainian SSR

Sport
- Country: Ukraine
- Sport: Athletics
- Event: High jump

Achievements and titles
- Personal best: High jump: 1.95 m (2003)
Medal record
Women's athletics
Representing Ukraine
World Youth Championships
Gold medal – first place	2003 Sherbrooke	High jump
World Junior Championships
Gold medal – first place	2004 Grosseto	High jump
Summer Universiade
Silver medal – second place	2005 Izmir	High jump
European Junior Championships
Bronze medal – third place	2005 Kaunas	High jump
European Youth Olympic Festival
Gold medal – first place	2003 Paris	High jump

Iryna Kovalenko (Ukrainian: Ірина В'ячеславівна Коваленко; born 12 June 1986) is a Ukrainian female high jumper, who won an individual gold medal at the Youth World Championships.
