= Orla Venter =

Namibian female athlete (born 1976)

Orla Venter (born 1 January 1976) is a Namibian female athlete. Venter competed at the 1993 World Championships in Athletics in the high jump She finished tied for 18th place with Megumi Sato of Japan.
