= Athletics at the 2013 SEA Games – Women's high jump =

The women's high jump at the 2013 SEA Games, the athletics was held in Naypyidaw, Myanmar. The track and field events took place at the Wunna Theikdi Stadiumon December 19.

== Schedule ==
All times are Myanmar Standard Time (UTC+06:30)

Date	Time	Event
Thursday, 19 December 2013	14:00	Final

== Records ==
Prior to this competition, the existing world, Asian, and Southeast Asian Games records were as follows.

World Record	Stefka Kostadinova (BUL)	2.09	Rome, Italy	30 August 1987
Asian Record	Marina Aitova (KAZ)	1.99	Athens, Greece	13 July 2009
Games Record	Noeng-ruthai Chaipech (THA)	1.94	Vientiane, Laos	14 December 2009

== Results ==
Legend

- NM — No Mark
- DNS — Did Not Start

Rank	Athlete	Result	Notes
1st place, gold medalist(s)	Duong Thi Viet Anh (VIE)	1.84	
2nd place, silver medalist(s)	Wanida Boonwan (THA)	1.80	
3rd place, bronze medalist(s)	Pham Thi Diem (VIE)	1.80	
4	Sean Yee Yap (MAS)	1.70	
—	Chaw Chaw (MYA)	NM	
—	Naw Yee Yee Than (MYA)	NM	
—	Kotchakorn Khamrueangsri (THA)	DNS	
