= Athletics at the 2010 Asian Games – Women's high jump =

Women's high jump at the 2010 Asian Games
- Venue: Aoti Main Stadium
- Dates: 26 November 2010
- Competitors: 8 from 6 nations

Medalists
gold medal	Svetlana Radzivil	Uzbekistan
silver medal	Nadiya Dusanova	Uzbekistan
bronze medal	Anna Ustinova	Kazakhstan
bronze medal	Zheng Xingjuan	China

The women's high jump event at the 2010 Asian Games was held at the Aoti Main Stadium, Guangzhou, China on 26 November.

== Schedule ==
All times are China Standard Time (UTC+08:00)

Date	Time	Event
Friday, 26 November 2010	17:00	Final

== Records ==
Prior to this competition, the existing world, Asian and Games records were as follows.

World Record	Stefka Kostadinova (BUL)	2.09	Rome, Italy	30 August 1987
Asian Record	Marina Aitova (KAZ)	1.99	Athens, Greece	13 July 2009
Games Record	Megumi Sato (JPN)	1.94	Beijing, China	29 September 1990

== Results ==
Rank	Athlete	Attempt										Result	Notes
Rank	Athlete	1.60	1.65	1.70	1.75	1.80	1.84	1.87	1.90	1.93	1.95	Result	Notes
1st place, gold medalist(s)	Svetlana Radzivil (UZB)	–	–	–	–	O	O	O	XXO	XO	XXO	1.95	GR
2nd place, silver medalist(s)	Nadiya Dusanova (UZB)	–	–	–	–	O	O	O	O	XO	XXX	1.93	
3rd place, bronze medalist(s)	Anna Ustinova (KAZ)	–	–	–	–	O	O	O	O	XXX		1.90	
3rd place, bronze medalist(s)	Zheng Xingjuan (CHN)	–	–	–	–	O	O	O	O	XXX		1.90	
5	Noengrothai Chaipetch (THA)	–	–	O	O	O	O	O	XXX			1.87	
5	Tatyana Efimenko (KGZ)	–	–	–	–	O	O	O	XXX			1.87	
7	Wanida Boonwan (THA)	–	–	O	O	O	XO	XXX				1.84	
7	Sahana Kumari (IND)	–	–	O	O	O	XO	XXX				1.84	
