= 2009 Asian Athletics Championships – Women's high jump =

The women's high jump event at the 2009 Asian Athletics Championships was held at the Guangdong Olympic Stadium on November 13.

== Results ==
Rank	Athlete	Nationality	1.60	1.65	1.70	1.75	1.80	1.84	1.87	1.90	1.93	1.95	Result	Notes
1st place, gold medalist(s)	Zheng Xingjuan	China	–	–	–	o	o	o	o	xxo	o	xxx	1.93	
2nd place, silver medalist(s)	Nadiya Dusanova	Uzbekistan	–	–	–	o	o	xo	o	xo	x–	xx	1.90	
3rd place, bronze medalist(s)	Svetlana Radzivil	Uzbekistan	–	–	–	o	o	xxo	o	xxx			1.87	
4	Tatiana Efimenko	Kyrgyzstan	–	–	–	o	xo	o	xxo	xxx			1.87	
5	Bui Thi Nhung	Vietnam	–	–	o	o	xxo	o	xxx				1.84	
6	Noengrothai Chaipetch	Thailand	–	–	o	o	o	xxo	xxx				1.84	
7	Sahana Kumari	India	–	–	o	xo	xo	xxx					1.80	
8	Gu Xuan	China	–	o	o	o	xxx						1.75	
9	Priyangika Madumanthi	Sri Lanka	–	–	xo	o	xxx						1.75	
10	Yuki Mimura	Japan	–	xo	o	xo	xxx						1.75	
10	Sepideh Tavkoly	Iran	–	o	xo	xo	xxx						1.75	
12	Sng Michelle	Singapore	–	o	o	xxx							1.70	
13	Rim Abdullah	Syria	xo	xxx									1.60	
	Wanida Boonwan	Thailand											DNS	
