= Uzbekistan at the 2015 World Championships in Athletics =

- WA code: UZB
- Website: uzathletics.uz

in Beijing
- Competitors: 4
- Medals: Gold 0 Silver 0 Bronze 0 Total 0

World Championships in Athletics appearances
- 1993; 1995; 1997; 1999; 2001; 2003; 2005; 2007; 2009; 2011; 2013; 2015; 2017; 2019; 2022; 2023; 2025

Uzbekistan competed at the 2015 World Championships in Athletics in Beijing, China, from 22–30 August 2015.

== Results ==
(q – qualified, NM – no mark, SB – season best)

=== Men ===
Field events

Athlete	Event	Qualification		Final	
Athlete	Event	Distance	Position	Distance	Position
Suhrob Khodjaev	Hammer throw	71.24	26	Did not advance	

=== Women ===
Track and road events

Athlete	Event	Heat		Semifinal		Final	
Athlete	Event	Result	Rank	Result	Rank	Result	Rank
Sitora Hamidova	Marathon	—N/a				DNF	

Field events

Athlete	Event	Qualification		Final	
Athlete	Event	Distance	Position	Distance	Position
Svetlana Radzivil	High jump	1.92	13 q	1.88	9

Combined events – Heptathlon

Athlete	Event	100H	HJ	SP	200 m	LJ	JT	800 m	Final	Rank
Ekaterina Voronina	Result	15.09 PB	1.80 SB	13.52 SB	25.77	5.81	44.44 SB	2:24.04 SB	5701 SB	24
Ekaterina Voronina	Points	830	978	762	817	792	753	769	5701 SB	24
