= Athletics at the 2006 Asian Games – Women's high jump =

Women's high jump at the 2006 Asian Games
- Venue: Khalifa International Stadium
- Date: 11 December 2006
- Competitors: 13 from 10 nations

Medalists
gold medal	Marina Aitova	Kazakhstan
silver medal	Tatyana Efimenko	Kyrgyzstan
silver medal	Zheng Xingjuan	China

The women's high jump competition at the 2006 Asian Games in Doha, Qatar was held on 11 December 2006 at the Khalifa International Stadium.

== Schedule ==
All times are Arabia Standard Time (UTC+03:00)

Date	Time	Event
Monday, 11 December 2006	17:00	Final

== Records ==
Prior to this competition, the existing world, Asian and Games records were as follows.

World Record	Stefka Kostadinova (BUL)	2.09	Rome, Italy	30 August 1987
Asian Record	Jin Ling (CHN)	1.97	Hamamatsu, Japan	7 May 1989
Games Record	Megumi Sato (JPN)	1.94	Beijing, China	29 September 1990

== Results ==
Legend

- NM — No mark

Rank	Athlete	Attempt										Result	Notes
Rank	Athlete	1.60	1.65	1.70	1.75	1.80	1.84	1.88	1.91	1.93	1.95	Result	Notes
1st place, gold medalist(s)	Marina Aitova (KAZ)	–	–	–	–	O	O	O	O	O	XXX	1.93	
2nd place, silver medalist(s)	Tatyana Efimenko (KGZ)	–	–	–	–	O	O	O	O	XXX		1.91	
2nd place, silver medalist(s)	Zheng Xingjuan (CHN)	–	–	–	O	O	O	O	O	X–	XX	1.91	
4	Bùi Thị Nhung (VIE)	–	–	–	–	XO	XO	O	XXX			1.88	
5	Miyuki Aoyama (JPN)	–	–	–	XO	XO	O	XXX				1.84	
6	Anna Ustinova (KAZ)	–	–	–	XO	XO	XO	XXX				1.84	
7	Svetlana Radzivil (UZB)	–	–	O	O	O	XXO	XXX				1.84	
8	Noengrothai Chaipetch (THA)	–	XO	XO	O	XXO	XXO	XXX				1.84	
9	Nguyễn Thị Ngọc Tâm (VIE)	–	–	O	O	XXX						1.75	
9	Michelle Sng (SIN)	–	O	O	O	XXX						1.75	
11	Tharanga Vinodhani (SRI)	O	XXO	XXX								1.65	
12	Dulanjalee Ranasinghe (SRI)	XXO	XXX									1.60	
—	Hanan Al-Khamis (KUW)	XXX										NM	
