= Uzbekistan at the 2019 World Athletics Championships =

- WA code: UZB

in Doha, Qatar
- Competitors: 6 (2 men and 4 women) in 5 events
- Medals: Gold 0 Silver 0 Bronze 0 Total 0

World Athletics Championships appearances
- 1993; 1995; 1997; 1999; 2001; 2003; 2005; 2007; 2009; 2011; 2013; 2015; 2017; 2019; 2022; 2023

Uzbekistan competed at the 2019 World Athletics Championships in Doha, Qatar from 27 September to 6 October 2019.

== Results ==
(q – qualified, NM – no mark, SB – season best)

=== Men ===
Track and road events

Athlete	Event	Final	
Athlete	Event	Result	Rank
Andrey Petrov	Marathon	2:24:54	49

Field events

Athlete	Event	Qualification		Final	
Athlete	Event	Result	Rank	Result	Rank
Ruslan Kurbanov	Triple jump	15.86	31	did not advance	

=== Women ===
Track and road events

Athlete	Event	Final	
Athlete	Event	Result	Rank
Sitora Hamidova	Marathon	did not finish	

Field events

Athlete	Event	Qualification		Final	
Athlete	Event	Result	Rank	Result	Rank
Svetlana Radzivil	High jump	1.94 SB	8 Q	1.89	12
Nadiya Dusanova	High jump	1.80	26	did not advance	

Combined events – Heptathlon

Athlete	Event	100H	HJ	SP	200 m	LJ	JT	800 m	Final	Rank
Ekaterina Voronina	Result	14.64	1.80	13.66	25.03	5.83	51.60	2:15.40	6099	10
Ekaterina Voronina	Points	890	978	771	884	798	891	887	6099	10
