= 2019 Asian Athletics Championships – Women's high jump =

Women's high jump at the 2019 Asian Athletics Championships
- Venue: Khalifa International Stadium
- Location: Doha, Qatar
- Dates: 23 April
- Competitors: 10 from 7 nations
- Winning height: 1.90 m

Medalists
gold medal	Nadezhda Dusanova	Uzbekistan
silver medal	Nadezhda Dubovitskaya	Kazakhstan
bronze medal	Svetlana Radzivil	Uzbekistan

The women's high jump at the 2019 Asian Athletics Championships was held on 23 April.

== Records ==
Records before the 2019 Asian Athletics Championships
Record	Athlete (nation)	Height (m)	Location	Date
World record	Stefka Kostadinova (BUL)	2.09	Rome, Italy	30 August 1987
Asian record	Nadezhda Dubovitskaya (KAZ)	2.00	Almaty, Kazakhstan	8 June 2021
Championship record	Miki Imai (JPN)	1.94	Fukuoka, Japan	1998
Championship record	Tatyana Efimenko (KGZ)	1.94	Amman, Jordan	28 July 2007
World leading	Mariya Lasitskene (ANA)	2.04	Moscow, Russia	3 February 2019
Asian leading	Safina Sadullayeva (UZB)	1.92	Oskemen, Kazakhstan	19 January 2019

== Results ==
Rank	Name	Nationality	1.60	1.70	1.75	1.80	1.83	1.86	1.88	1.90	1.94	Result	Notes
1st place, gold medalist(s)	Nadezhda Dusanova	Uzbekistan	–	–	o	o	o	xo	o	o	xxx	1.90	
2nd place, silver medalist(s)	Nadezhda Dubovitskaya	Kazakhstan	–	o	o	o	o	o	xo	xxx		1.88	PB
3rd place, bronze medalist(s)	Svetlana Radzivil	Uzbekistan	–	–	o	xo	xo	xo	xxo	xxx		1.88	
4	Lu Jiawen	China	–	o	xo	o	xxx					1.80	
5	Shieriai Tsuda	Japan	o	o	o	xxx						1.75	
5	Wang Yang	China	–	o	o	xxx						1.75	
5	Yeung Man Wai	Hong Kong	–	o	o	xxx						1.75	
8	Tsai Ching-jung	Chinese Taipei	–	o	xxo	xxx						1.75	
9	Haruka Nakano	Japan	o	xo	xxo	r						1.75	
10	Michelle Suat Li	Singapore	–	o	xxx							1.70	
