= 2013 Asian Athletics Championships – Women's high jump =

The women's high jump at the 2013 Asian Athletics Championships was held at the Shree Shiv Chhatrapati Sports Complex on 4 July.

== Results ==
Rank	Name	Nationality	1.65	1.70	1.75	1.78	1.81	1.84	1.86	1.88	1.90	Result	Notes
1st place, gold medalist(s)	Nadiya Dusanova	Uzbekistan	–	–	o	o	o	o	xo	o	xo	1.90	
2nd place, silver medalist(s)	Svetlana Radzivil	Uzbekistan	–	–	o	o	o	o	xxo	o	xxx	1.88	
3rd place, bronze medalist(s)	Marina Aitova	Kazakhstan	–	–	–	o	o	o	o	xo	xxx	1.88	
4	Sahana Kumari	India	–	–	o	o	o	o	o	xxx		1.86	
5	Miyuki Fukumoto	Japan	–	–	xo	o	o	o	o	xxx		1.86	
6	Chen Yanjun	China	–	o	o	o	o	xxo	xxo	xxx		1.86	
7	Shen Xin	China	–	o	o	o	xo	xxx				1.81	
8	Wanida Boonwan	Thailand	–	o	o	o	xxo	xxx				1.81	
9	Pham Thi Diem	Vietnam	–	xo	o	–	xxo	xxx				1.81	
10	Mallika Mondal	India	xo	o	xo	xxx						1.75	
