= Uzbekistan at the 2017 World Championships in Athletics =

- WA code: UZB

in London
- Competitors: 2
- Medals: Gold 0 Silver 0 Bronze 0 Total 0

World Championships in Athletics appearances
- 1993; 1995; 1997; 1999; 2001; 2003; 2005; 2007; 2009; 2011; 2013; 2015; 2017; 2019; 2022; 2023; 2025

Uzbekistan competed at the 2017 World Championships in Athletics in London, Great Britain, from 4–13 August 2017.

== Results ==
(q – qualified, NM – no mark, SB – season best)

=== Women ===
Track and road events

Athlete	Event	Final	
Athlete	Event	Result	Rank
Sitora Hamidova	10,000 metres	31:57.42 NR	18

Field events

Athlete	Event	Qualification		Final	
Athlete	Event	Distance	Position	Distance	Position
Nadiya Dusanova	High jump	1.85	=21	Did not advance	
