= Uzbekistan at the 2009 World Championships in Athletics =

- WA code: UZB

in Berlin
- Competitors: 5
- Medals: Gold 0 Silver 0 Bronze 0 Total 0

World Championships in Athletics appearances
- 1993; 1995; 1997; 1999; 2001; 2003; 2005; 2007; 2009; 2011; 2013; 2015; 2017; 2019; 2022; 2023

Uzbekistan compete at the 2009 World Championships in Athletics from 15 to 23 August. A team of 6 athletes was announced for the competition.

== Team selection ==
Track and road events

Event	Athletes	
Event	Men	Women
100 metres		Guzel Khubbieva
200 metres		Guzel Khubbieva
400 metres		
800 metres		
1500 metres		
5000 metres		
10000 metres		
Marathon		
100 metres hurdles	—	
110 metres hurdles		—
400 metres hurdles		
3000 m steeplechase		
20 km race walk		
50 km race walk		—
4×100 metres relay		
4×400 metres relay		

Field and combined events

Event	Athletes	
Event	Men	Women
Pole vault	Leonid Andreev	
High jump		Nadiya Dusanova; Svetlana Radzivil
Long jump		
Triple jump		
Shot put		
Discus throw		
Hammer throw		
Javelin throw		
Heptathlon	—	Yuliya Tarasova
Decathlon		—

== Results ==
=== Men ===
Field events

Event	Athletes	Qualification		Final	
Event	Athletes	Result	Rank	Result	Rank
Pole vault	Leonid Andreev	5.55	19	did not advance	

=== Women ===
Track and road events

Event	Athletes	Heat Round 1		Heat Round 2		Semifinal		Final	
Event	Athletes	Result	Rank	Result	Rank	Result	Rank	Result	Rank
100 metres	Guzel Khubbieva	11.63	31 Q	11.43	17	did not advance			
200 metres	Guzel Khubbieva	23.61	34			did not advance			

Field and combined events

Event	Athletes	Qualification		Final	
Event	Athletes	Result	Rank	Result	Rank
High jump	Nadiya Dusanova	1.89	24	did not advance	
High jump	Svetlana Radzivil	1.89	21	did not advance	
Heptathlon	Yuliya Tarasova			5658	21
