= Athletics at the 2014 Asian Games – Women's high jump =

Women's high jump at the 2014 Asian Games
- Venue: Incheon Asiad Main Stadium
- Dates: 2 October 2014
- Competitors: 10 from 8 nations

Medalists
| gold medal | Svetlana Radzivil | Uzbekistan |
| silver medal | Zheng Xingjuan | China |
| bronze medal | Nadiya Dusanova | Uzbekistan |

The women's high jump event at the 2014 Asian Games was held at the Incheon Asiad Main Stadium, Incheon, South Korea on 2 October.

== Schedule ==
All times are Korea Standard Time (UTC+09:00)

| Date | Time | Event |
|---|---|---|
| Monday, 2 October 2014 | 18:30 | Final |

== Records ==
Prior to this competition, the existing world, Asian and Games records were as follows.

| World Record | Stefka Kostadinova (BUL) | 2.09 | Rome, Italy | 30 August 1987 |
| Asian Record | Marina Aitova (KAZ) | 1.99 | Athens, Greece | 13 July 2009 |
| Games Record | Svetlana Radzivil (UZB) | 1.95 | Guangzhou, China | 26 November 2010 |

== Results ==
| Rank | Athlete | Attempt | | | | | | | | Result | Notes |
| Rank | Athlete | 1.70 | 1.75 | 1.80 | 1.85 | 1.89 | 1.92 | 1.94 | 2.00 | Result | Notes |
|---|---|---|---|---|---|---|---|---|---|---|---|
| 1st place, gold medalist(s) | Svetlana Radzivil (UZB) | – | – | O | O | XO | XO | XXO | XXX | 1.94 | |
| 2nd place, silver medalist(s) | Zheng Xingjuan (CHN) | – | – | O | XO | O | XO | XXX | | 1.92 | |
| 3rd place, bronze medalist(s) | Nadiya Dusanova (UZB) | – | – | O | XO | O | XXX | | | 1.89 | |
| 4 | Marina Aitova (KAZ) | – | – | O | O | XXX | | | | 1.85 | |
| 5 | Wanida Boonwan (THA) | O | XO | XO | O | XXX | | | | 1.85 | |
| 6 | Zhang Luyu (CHN) | O | O | O | XXO | XXX | | | | 1.85 | |
| 7 | Phạm Thị Diễm (VIE) | O | O | O | XXX | | | | | 1.80 | |
| 8 | Sahana Kumari (IND) | – | O | XO | XXX | | | | | 1.80 | |
| 9 | Miyuki Fukumoto (JPN) | O | O | XXO | XXX | | | | | 1.80 | |
| 10 | Seok Mi-jung (KOR) | O | XO | XXX | | | | | | 1.75 | |
