= 2017 Asian Athletics Championships – Women's high jump =

The women's high jump at the 2017 Asian Athletics Championships was held on 7 July.

== Results ==
Rank	Name	Nationality	1.65	1.70	1.75	1.80	1.84	1.88	Result	Notes
1st place, gold medalist(s)	Nadiya Dusanova	Uzbekistan	–	–	o	xo	xo	xxx	1.84	
2nd place, silver medalist(s)	Yeung Man Wai	Hong Kong	–	–	o	o	xxx		1.80	
2nd place, silver medalist(s)	Wang Xueyi	China	–	o	o	o	xxx		1.80	
2nd place, silver medalist(s)	Liu Jingyi	China	o	o	o	o	xxx		1.80	
5	Wanida Boonwan	Thailand	o	o	o	xo	xxx		1.80	
6	Yap Sean	Malaysia	o	o	xo	xxx			1.75	
6	Nadezhda Dubovitskaya	Kazakhstan	–	o	xo	xxx			1.75	
6	Haruka Nakano	Japan	o	o	xo	xxx			1.75	
6	Sahana Kumari	India	–	o	xo	xxx			1.75	
10	Dulanjali Kumari	Sri Lanka	–	o	xxo	xxx			1.75	
11	Sumire Hata	Japan	o	xo	xxo	xxx			1.75	

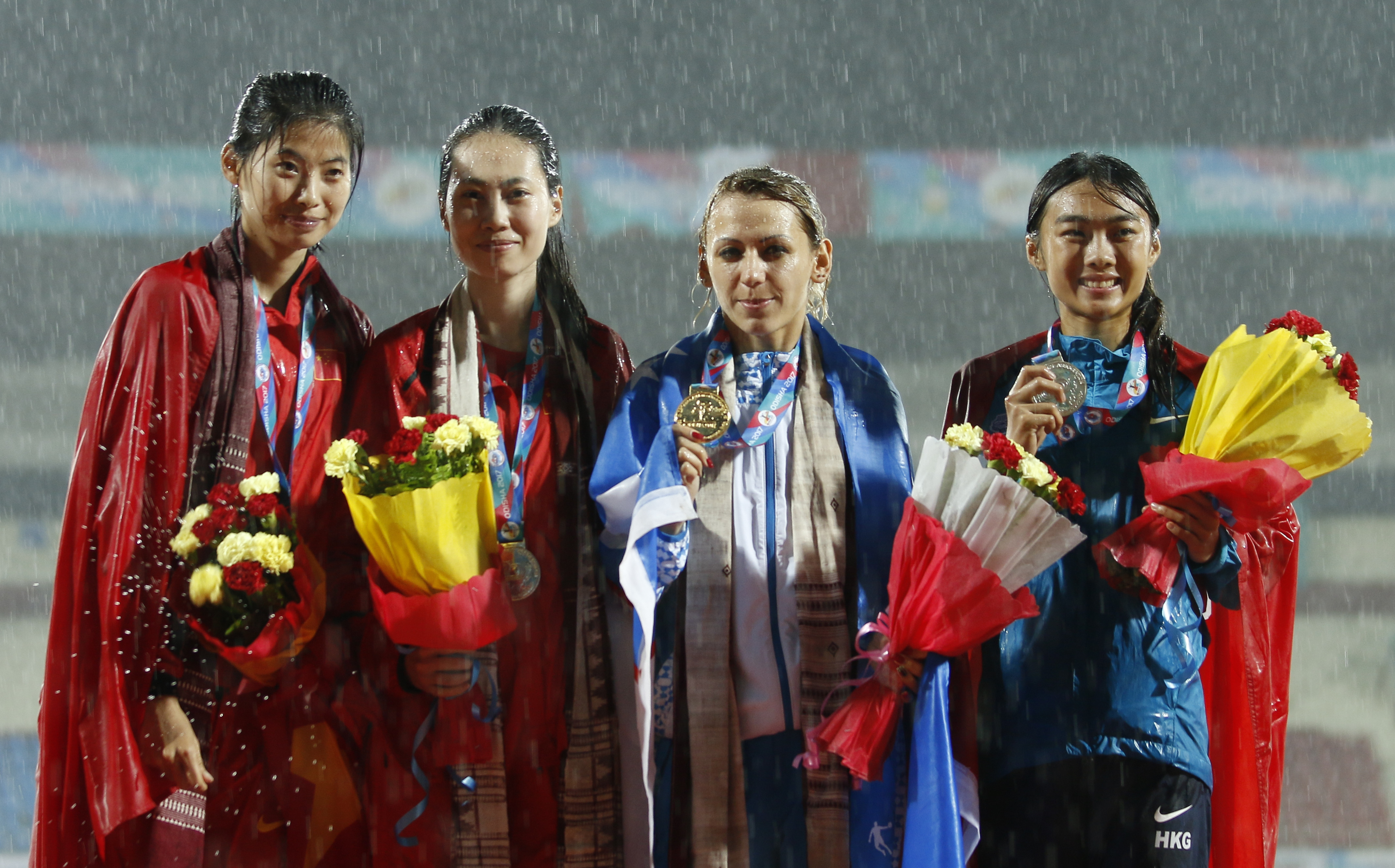
The medallists
