= Athletics at the 2018 Asian Games – Women's high jump =

Women's high jump at the 2018 Asian Games
- Venue: Gelora Bung Karno Stadium
- Date: 29 August 2018
- Competitors: 14 from 12 nations

Medalists
gold medal	Svetlana Radzivil	Uzbekistan
silver medal	Nadiya Dusanova	Uzbekistan
bronze medal	Nadezhda Dubovitskaya	Kazakhstan

The women's high jump competition at the 2018 Asian Games took place on 29 August 2018 at the Gelora Bung Karno Stadium.

== Schedule ==
All times are Western Indonesia Time (UTC+07:00)

Date	Time	Event
Wednesday, 29 August 2018	20:15	Final

== Records ==
Prior to this competition, the existing world, Asian and Games records were as follows.

World Record	Stefka Kostadinova (BUL)	2.09	Rome, Italy	30 August 1987
Asian Record	Marina Aitova (KAZ)	1.99	Athens, Greece	13 July 2009
Games Record	Svetlana Radzivil (UZB)	1.95	Guangzhou, China	26 November 2010

== Results ==
Legend

- r — Retired

Rank	Athlete	Attempt										Result	Notes
Rank	Athlete	1.65	1.70	1.75	1.80	1.84	1.88	1.91	1.94	1.96	1.98	Result	Notes
1st place, gold medalist(s)	Svetlana Radzivil (UZB)	–	–	–	O	O	O	XO	XXO	O	XXr	1.96	GR
2nd place, silver medalist(s)	Nadiya Dusanova (UZB)	–	–	O	O	O	XO	XXO	O	X–	XX	1.94	
3rd place, bronze medalist(s)	Nadezhda Dubovitskaya (KAZ)	–	O	XO	XO	XXO	XXX					1.84	
4	Wang Xueyi (CHN)	–	O	O	O	XXX						1.80	
5	Yeung Man Wai (HKG)	–	O	O	XO	XXX						1.80	
6	Dương Thị Việt Anh (VIE)	–	O	XO	XXO	XXX						1.80	
7	Michelle Sng (SGP)	O	O	O	XXX							1.75	
7	Sepideh Tavakkoli (IRI)	–	O	O	XXX							1.75	
9	Wanida Boonwan (THA)	O	O	XXO	XXX							1.75	
9	Tsai Ching-jung (TPE)	–	O	XXO	XXX							1.75	
11	Maryam Abdul-Hameed (IRQ)	O	O	XXX								1.70	
11	Nadia Anggraini (INA)	O	O	XXX								1.70	
11	Prangthip Chitkhokkruad (THA)	O	O	XXX								1.70	
11	Seok Mi-jung (KOR)	O	O	XXX								1.70	
