= Anna Ustinova (high jumper) =

Kazakhstani high jumper

Medal record

Women's athletics

Representing Kazakhstan

Asian Championships
Bronze medal – third place	2005 Incheon	High jump
Bronze medal – third place	2007 Amman	High jump

Asian Indoor Championships
Silver medal – second place	2008 Doha	High jump
Silver medal – second place	2010 Tehran	High jump

Anna Ustinova (born 8 December 1985) is a Kazakhstani high jumper.

She finished seventh at the 2004 World Junior Championships and the 2005 Universiade, won the bronze medal at the 2005 Asian Championships and finished sixth at the 2006 Asian Games. In 2007, she won bronze medals at the Asian Championships and the Universiade, before competing at the 2007 World Championships without reaching the final. She won the silver medal at the 2010 Asian Indoor Athletics Championships behind compatriot Marina Aitova.

Her personal best jump is 1.92 metres, achieved in July 2006 in Almaty.

== Competition record ==
Year	Competition	Venue	Position	Notes
Representing Kazakhstan
2002	Asian Junior Championships	Bangkok, Thailand	3rd	1.76 m
2004	Asian Junior Championships	Ipoh, Malaysia	1st	1.84 m
2004	World Junior Championships	Grosseto, Italy	7th	1.84 m
2005	Universiade	İzmir, Turkey	7th	1.80 m
2005	Asian Championships	Incheon, South Korea	3rd	1.84 m
2005	Asian Indoor Games	Bangkok, Thailand	2nd	1.84 m
2006	Asian Games	Doha, Qatar	6th	1.84 m
2007	Asian Championships	Amman, Jordan	3rd	1.91 m
2007	Universiade	Bangkok, Thailand	3rd	1.90 m
2007	World Championships	Osaka, Japan	20th (q)	1.88 m
2007	Asian Indoor Games	Macau	3rd	1.88 m
2008	Asian Indoor Championships	Doha, Qatar	2nd	1.91 m
2009	Universiade	Belgrade, Serbia	14th (q)	1.80 m
2010	Asian Indoor Championships	Tehran, Iran	2nd	1.86 m
2010	World Indoor Championships	Istanbul, Turkey	20th (q)	1.81 m
2010	Asian Games	Guangzhou, China	3rd	1.90 m
2011	Asian Championships	Kobe, Japan	4th	1.85 m
2011	Universiade	Shenzhen, China	10th	1.84 m
