= Athletics at the 2007 Summer Universiade – Women's high jump =

The women's high jump event at the 2007 Summer Universiade was held on 11–13 August.

== Medalists ==
Gold	Silver	Bronze
Marina Aitova; Kazakhstan	Ariane Friedrich; Germany; Anna Ustinova; Kazakhstan	

== Results ==
=== Qualification ===
Rank	Group	Athlete	Nationality	Result	Notes
1	A	Marina Aitova	Kazakhstan	1.85	q
1	A	Ariane Friedrich	Germany	1.85	q
1	A	Viktoria Leks	Estonia	1.85	q
4	A	Elena Meuti	Italy	1.85	q
5	A	Aleksandra Shamsutdinova	Russia	1.85	q
6	A	Maroula Papageorgiou	Greece	1.80	q
7	A	Wanida Boonwan	Thailand	1.80	q
7	A	Karolina Gronau	Poland	1.80	q
9	A	He Yanhong	China	1.70	
9	A	Sharon Heveran	Ireland	1.70	
11	A	Rita Babos	Hungary	1.70	
11	A	Jillian Drouin	Canada	1.70	
1	B	Anna Iljuštšenko	Estonia	1.85	q
1	B	Anna Ustinova	Kazakhstan	1.85	q
3	B	Svetlana Shkolina	Russia	1.85	q
4	B	Gema Martín-Pouzelo	Spain	1.80	q
4	B	Michelle Moody	Canada	1.80	q
6	B	Beatrice Lundmark	Switzerland	1.80	q
7	B	Meliza Amamus	Namibia	1.70	
7	B	Fabiola Ayala	Mexico	1.70	
7	B	Noengrothai Chaipetch	Thailand	1.70	
7	B	Persefoni Hatzinakou	Greece	1.70	
7	B	Ma Pei	China	1.70	
7	B	Nguyen Thi Ngoc Tam	Vietnam	1.70	
	B	Sng Michelle	Singapore	NM	

=== Final ===
Rank	Athlete	Nationality	1.70	1.80	1.85	1.88	1.90	1.92	1.95	Result	Notes
1st place, gold medalist(s)	Marina Aitova	Kazakhstan	–	o	o	xo	xo	xxo	xxx	1.92	
2nd place, silver medalist(s)	Ariane Friedrich	Germany	–	o	o	o	o	xxx		1.90	
2nd place, silver medalist(s)	Anna Ustinova	Kazakhstan	–	o	o	o	o	xxx		1.90	
4	Svetlana Shkolina	Russia	–	o	o	o	xo	xxx		1.90	
5	Viktoria Leks	Estonia	o	xxo	o	xxx				1.85	
6	Aleksandra Shamsutdinova	Russia	o	o	xo	xxx				1.85	
7	Wanida Boonwan	Thailand	o	xxo	xo	xxx				1.85	PB
8	Maroula Papageorgiou	Greece	o	o	xxx					1.80	
9	Anna Iljuštšenko	Estonia	o	xo	xxx					1.80	
9	Gema Martín-Pouzelo	Spain	o	xo	xxx					1.80	
11	Beatrice Lundmark	Switzerland	xxo	xxo	xxx					1.80	
12	Karolina Gronau	Poland	o	xxx						1.70	
12	Elena Meuti	Italy	o	xxx						1.70	
12	Michelle Moody	Canada	o	xxx						1.70	
