= Miyuki Fukumoto =

Japanese high jumper (born 1977)

Medal record

Women's athletics

Representing Japan

Asian Championships
Silver medal – second place	2003 Manila	High jump

Asian Indoor Championships
Gold medal – first place	2004 Tehran	High jump

Miyuki Fukumoto (née Aoyama; born 4 January 1977) is a female high jumper from Japan. Her personal best jump is 1.92 metres, achieved in July 2004 in Osaka.

She won the silver medal at the 2003 Asian Championships, and finished fifth at the 2006 Asian Games. She was the Japanese national high jump champion in 2006. She competed at the 2007 World Championships without reaching the final.

== International competitions ==
Representing Japan
Year	Competition	Venue	Position	Event	Notes
2000	Asian Championships	Jakarta, Indonesia	6th	1.75 m	
2003	Asian Championships	Manila, Philippines	2nd	1.84 m	
2004	Asian Indoor Championships	Tehran, Iran	1st	1.83 m	
2005	Asian Championships	Incheon, South Korea	9th	1.80 m	
2006	Asian Indoor Championships	Pattaya, Thailand	4th	1.85 m	
2006	Asian Games	Doha, Qatar	5th	1.84 m	
2007	Asian Championships	Amman, Jordan	4th	1.88 m	
2007	World Championships	Osaka, Japan	29th (q)	1.84 m	
2011	Asian Championships	Kobe, Japan	7th	1.80 m	
2012	Asian Indoor Championships	Hangzhou, China	6th	1.75 m	
2013	Asian Championships	Pune, India	5th	1.86 m	
2013	World Championships	Moscow, Russia	27th (q)	1.78 m	
2014	Asian Games	Incheon, South Korea	9th	1.80 m	
