= 2015 Asian Athletics Championships – Women's high jump =

The women's high jump event at the 2015 Asian Athletics Championships was held on June 3.

== Results ==
Rank	Name	Nationality	1.70	1.75	1.80	1.84	1.88	1.91	1.94	Result	Notes
1st place, gold medalist(s)	Svetlana Radzivil	Uzbekistan	–	o	o	o	o	xo	xxx	1.91	
2nd place, silver medalist(s)	Wang Yang	China	–	o	o	o	xxo	xxx		1.88	
3rd place, bronze medalist(s)	Zheng Xingjuan	China	–	–	xo	o	xxx			1.84	
4	Zhang Luyu	China	o	xxo	xxx					1.75	
5	Yap Sean Yee	Malaysia	o	xxx						1.70	
	Sheriai Tsuda	Japan	xxx							NM	
