= Athletics at the 1998 Asian Games – Women's high jump =

Women's high jump at the 1998 Asian Games
- Venue: Thammasat Stadium
- Dates: 13 December 1998
- Competitors: 7 from 4 nations

Medalists
gold medal	Yoko Ota	Japan
silver medal	Jin Ling	China
bronze medal	Anna Cherntsova	Kyrgyzstan

The women's high jump competition at the 1998 Asian Games in Bangkok, Thailand was held on 13 December at the Thammasat Stadium.

== Schedule ==
All times are Indochina Time (UTC+07:00)

Date	Time	Event
Sunday, 13 December 1998	14:00	Final

== Results ==
Legend

- NM — No mark

Rank	Athlete	Result	Notes
1st place, gold medalist(s)	Yoko Ota (JPN)	1.88	
2nd place, silver medalist(s)	Jin Ling (CHN)	1.88	
3rd place, bronze medalist(s)	Anna Cherntsova (KGZ)	1.84	
4	Tatyana Efimenko (KGZ)	1.84	
4	Miki Imai (JPN)	1.84	
6	Rassamee Taemsri (THA)	1.84	
—	Achalakorn Kerdchang (THA)	NM	
