= 2005 Asian Athletics Championships – Women's high jump =

The women's high jump event at the 2005 Asian Athletics Championships was held in Incheon, South Korea on September 2.

== Results ==
Rank	Name	Nationality	Result	Notes
1st place, gold medalist(s)	Tatyana Efimenko	Kyrgyzstan	1.92	
2nd place, silver medalist(s)	Jing Xuezhu	China	1.92	SB
3rd place, bronze medalist(s)	Anna Ustinova	Kazakhstan	1.84	
4	Bui Thi Nhung	Vietnam	1.84	
5	Svetlana Stavskaya	Kazakhstan	1.80	
5	Nguyen Thi Ngoc Tam	Vietnam	1.80	
7	Netnapa Thaiking	Thailand	1.80	=SB
8	Yoko Hunnicutt	Japan	1.80	
9	Miyuki Fukumoto	Japan	1.80	
10	Yoon Myong-Ja	South Korea	1.70	
11	Park Jin-Hee	South Korea	1.70	
	Shabana Khanum	Malaysia	NM	
