= Uzbekistan at the 2011 World Championships in Athletics =

- WA code: UZB
- National federation: The Athletic Federation of Uzbekistan
- Website: www.uzathletics.org

in Daegu
- Competitors: 7
- Medals: Gold 0 Silver 0 Bronze 0 Total 0

World Championships in Athletics appearances
- 1993; 1995; 1997; 1999; 2001; 2003; 2005; 2007; 2009; 2011; 2013; 2015; 2017; 2019; 2022; 2023

Uzbekistan competed at the 2011 World Championships in Athletics from August 27 to September 4 in Daegu, South Korea. A team of 7 athletes was announced to represent the country in the event.

== Results ==
=== Men ===
Athlete	Event	Preliminaries		Heats		Semifinals		Final	
Athlete	Event	Time Width Height	Rank	Time Width Height	Rank	Time Width Height	Rank	Time Width Height	Rank
Rinat Tarzumanov	Javelin throw	70.32	36					Did not advance	

=== Women ===
Athlete	Event	Preliminaries		Heats		Semifinals		Final	
Athlete	Event	Time Width Height	Rank	Time Width Height	Rank	Time Width Height	Rank	Time Width Height	Rank
Guzel Khubbieva	100 metres			11.45	31	Did not advance			
Yuliya Tarasova	Long jump	6.26	25					Did not advance	
Anastasiya Juravleva	Triple jump	14.00	18					Did not advance	
Valeriya Kanatova	Triple jump	13.86	22					Did not advance	
Aleksandra Kotlyarova	Triple jump	13.78	24					Did not advance	
Svetlana Radzivil	High jump	1.95 SB	9					1.93	8
