= 2002 Asian Athletics Championships – Women's high jump =

The women's high jump event at the 2002 Asian Athletics Championships was held in Colombo, Sri Lanka on 10 August.

== Results ==
Rank	Name	Nationality	Result	Notes
1st place, gold medalist(s)	Tatyana Efimenko	Kyrgyzstan	1.92	
2nd place, silver medalist(s)	Bobby Aloysius	India	1.84	
3rd place, bronze medalist(s)	Marina Aitova	Kazakhstan	1.84	
4	Miki Imai	Japan	1.80	
5	Svetlana Zalevskaya	Kazakhstan	1.80	
6	Yoko Hunnicutt	Japan	1.75	
7	Park Jin-Hee	South Korea	1.70	
8	S.S.K. Poddiwela	Sri Lanka	1.65	PB
9	Kodikara Chathuri	Sri Lanka	1.65	PB
10	Narcisa Atienza	Philippines	1.65	
11	Vinodani Tharanga	Sri Lanka	1.60	PB
