= Bùi Thị Nhung =

Vietnamese high jumper (born 1983)

Medal record

Women's athletics

Representing Vietnam

Asian Championships
Gold medal – first place	2003 Manila	High jump

SEA Games
Gold medal – first place	2005 Manila	High jump
Gold medal – first place	2007 Nakhon Ratchasima	High jump
Silver medal – second place	2003 Hanoi	High jump

Bùi Thị Nhung (born 21 January 1983 in Hải Phòng) is a Vietnamese high jumper. Her personal best jump is 1.94 metres, achieved in June 2005 in Bangkok.

She won the gold medal at the 2003 Asian Championships, and finished fourth at the 2006 Asian Games. She also competed at the 2004 Olympic Games without reaching the final.

== Achievements ==
Year	Competition	Venue	Position	Notes
Representing Vietnam
2003	Asian Championships	Manila, Philippines	1st	1.88 m
2003	Southeast Asian Games	Hanoi, Vietnam	2nd	1.83 m
2004	Olympic Games	Athens, Greece	33rd (q)	1.80 m
2005	Asian Championships	Incheon, South Korea	4th	1.84 m
2005	Southeast Asian Games	Manila, Philippines	1st	1.89 m
2006	Asian Games	Doha, Qatar	4th	1.88 m
2007	Asian Championships	Amman, Jordan	5th	1.88 m
2007	Asian Indoor Games	Macau	4th	1.84 m
2007	Southeast Asian Games	Nakhon Ratchasima, Thailand	1st	1.88 m
2009	World Championships	Berlin, Germany	– (q)	NM
2009	Asian Indoor Games	Hanoi, Vietnam	7th	1.80 m
2009	Asian Championships	Guangzhou, China	5th	1.84 m
2009	Southeast Asian Games	Vientiane, Laos	4th	1.80 m
