= Athletics at the 2005 Summer Universiade – Women's high jump =

International high jump competition

The women's high jump event at the 2005 Summer Universiade was held on 19 August in İzmir, Turkey.

== Results ==
Rank	Athlete	Nationality	1.70	1.80	1.85	1.88	1.90	2.02	Result	Notes
1st place, gold medalist(s)	Anna Chicherova	Russia	–	o	o	o	xo	xxx	1.90	
2nd place, silver medalist(s)	Iryna Kovalenko	Ukraine	o	o	o	o	xxx		1.88	
3rd place, bronze medalist(s)	Ariane Friedrich	Germany	–	xo	xo	xxo	xxx		1.88	
4	Svetlana Shkolina	Russia	o	o	o	xxx			1.85	
5	Maria Papayeoryiou	Greece	o	o	xo	xxx			1.85	
6	Bernadett Bódi	Hungary	o	o	xxx				1.80	
7	Ma Bei	China	o	xo	xxx				1.80	
7	Anna Ustinova	Kazakhstan	o	xo	xxx				1.80	
7	Netnapa Thaiking	Thailand	o	xo	xxx				1.80	=SB
10	Candeğer Kılınçer Oğuz	Turkey	o	xxo	xxx				1.80	
11	Whitney Evans	Canada	o	xxx					1.70	
11	Kristen Matthews	Canada	o	xxx					1.70	
11	Beatrice Lundmark	Switzerland	o	xxx					1.70	
14	Sarah Bouaoudia	Algeria	xo	xxx					1.70	
14	Natālija Čakova	Latvia	xo	xxx					1.70	
