= Uzbekistan at the 2013 World Championships in Athletics =

- WA code: UZB
- National federation: The Athletic Federation of Uzbekistan

in Moscow
- Competitors: 3
- Medals: Gold 0 Silver 0 Bronze 0 Total 0

World Championships in Athletics appearances
- 1993; 1995; 1997; 1999; 2001; 2003; 2005; 2007; 2009; 2011; 2013; 2015; 2017; 2019; 2022; 2023

Uzbekistan competed at the 2013 World Championships in Athletics in Moscow, Russia, from 10–18 August 2013. A team of 3 athletes was announced to represent the country in the event.

== Results ==
(q – qualified, NM – no mark, SB – season best)

=== Men ===
Athlete	Event	Preliminaries		Final	
Athlete	Event	Width Height	Rank	Width Height	Rank
Ivan Zaytsev	Javelin throw				

=== Women ===
Athlete	Event	Preliminaries		Final	
Athlete	Event	Width Height	Rank	Width Height	Rank
Nadiya Dusanova	High jump				
Anastasiya Juravleva	Triple jump				
