= 2003 Asian Athletics Championships – Women's high jump =

The women's high jump event at the 2003 Asian Athletics Championships was held in Manila, Philippines on September 21.

== Results ==
Rank	Name	Nationality	Result	Notes
1st place, gold medalist(s)	Bui Thi Nhung	Vietnam	1.88	NR
2nd place, silver medalist(s)	Miyuki Fukumoto	Japan	1.84	
3rd place, bronze medalist(s)	Noengrothai Chaipetch	Thailand	1.84	
4	Bobby Aloysius	India	1.80	
5	Rassamee Sumethivit	Thailand	1.80	
6	Maiko Iwakiri	Japan	1.75	
6	Svetlana Radzivil	Uzbekistan	1.75	
8	Narcisa Atienza	Philippines	1.70	
9	Lin Shu-Ching	Chinese Taipei	1.70	
