= Yoko Hunnicutt =

Japanese high jumper (born 1975)

Personal information
- Native name: 太田 陽子
- Nationality: (Japan) Japanese
- Born: Yoko Ota; January 14, 1975 (age 51) Amagasaki, Japan

Sport
- Country: Japan
- Sport: Track and field
- Event: High jump

Achievements and titles
- Personal best: high jump: 1.95m (2002)
Medal record
Women's athletics
Representing Japan
Asian Games
Gold medal – first place	1998 Bangkok	high jump
Asian Championships
Gold medal – first place	1991 Kuala Lumpur	high jump
Silver medal – second place	1998 Fukuoka	high jump
- Updated on 14 September 2015

Yoko Hunnicutt, née Ota (born 14 January 1975 in Amagasaki, Hyōgo and raised in Kamakura, Kanagawa) is a Japanese high jumper. Her personal best jump is 1.95 metres, achieved in July 2002 in Sapporo.

She finished fifth at the 1992 World Junior Championships and eleventh at the 2000 Olympics. At the regional level she won the 1991 Asian Championships and the 1998 Asian Games and finished second at the 1998 Asian Championships.

== Achievements ==
Year	Competition	Venue	Position	Event	Notes
Representing Japan
1991	Asian Championships	Kuala Lumpur, Malaysia	1st	High jump	1.83 m
1992	World Junior Championships	Seoul, South Korea	5th	High jump	1.85 m
1994	World Junior Championships	Lisbon, Portugal	12th	High jump	1.80 m
1995	Universiade	Fukuoka, Japan	9th	Triple jump	12.88 m
1998	Asian Championships	Fukuoka, Japan	2nd	High jump	1.91 m
1998	Asian Games	Bangkok, Thailand	1st	High jump	1.88 m
1999	World Championships	Seville, Spain	26th (q)	High jump	1.85 m
2000	Olympic Games	Sydney, Australia	11th	High jump	1.90 m
2002	Asian Championships	Colombo, Sri Lanka	6th	High jump	1.75 m
2002	Asian Games	Busan, South Korea	5th	High jump	1.80 m
2003	World Indoor Championships	Birmingham, United Kingdom	–	High jump	NM
2005	Asian Championships	Incheon, South Korea	8th	High jump	1.80 m
