= 2000 Asian Athletics Championships – Women's high jump =

The women's high jump event at the 2000 Asian Athletics Championships was held in Jakarta, Indonesia on 31 August.

== Results ==
Rank	Name	Nationality	1.65	1.70	1.75	1.80	1.83	1.86	Result	Notes
1st place, gold medalist(s)	Bobby Aloysius	India	–	o	o	o	o	xxx	1.83	
2nd place, silver medalist(s)	Marina Korzhova	Kazakhstan	–	o	o	xo	xxo	xxx	1.83	
3rd place, bronze medalist(s)	Tatyana Efimenko	Kyrgyzstan	–	–	o	o	xxx		1.80	
4	Liang Na	China							1.75	
5	Netnapa Thaiking	Thailand							1.75	
6	Miyuki Aoyama	Japan							1.75	
7	Tang Li-Wen	Chinese Taipei							1.70	
8	Alaa Abdelhadi	Jordan							1.65	
