= Athletics at the 2002 Asian Games – Women's high jump =

Sporting event

Women's high jump at the 2002 Asian Games
- Venue: Busan Asiad Main Stadium
- Date: 13 October 2002
- Competitors: 7 from 6 nations

Medalists
gold medal	Tatyana Efimenko	Kyrgyzstan
silver medal	Bobby Aloysius	India
silver medal	Marina Korzhova	Kazakhstan

The women's high jump competition at the 2002 Asian Games in Busan, South Korea was held on 13 October at the Busan Asiad Main Stadium.

== Schedule ==
All times are Korea Standard Time (UTC+09:00)

Date	Time	Event
Sunday, 13 October 2002	09:30	Final

== Records ==
Prior to this competition, the existing world, Asian and Games records were as follows.

World Record	Stefka Kostadinova (BUL)	2.09	Rome, Italy	30 August 1987
Asian Record	Jin Ling (CHN)	1.97	Hamamatsu, Japan	7 May 1989
Games Record	Megumi Sato (JPN)	1.94	Beijing, China	29 September 1990

== Results ==
Rank	Athlete	Attempt							Result	Notes
Rank	Athlete	1.70	1.75	1.80	1.84	1.88	1.90	1.95	Result	Notes
1st place, gold medalist(s)	Tatyana Efimenko (KGZ)	–	–	O	O	XXO	O	XXX	1.90	
2nd place, silver medalist(s)	Bobby Aloysius (IND)	O	O	O	O	O	XXX		1.88	
2nd place, silver medalist(s)	Marina Korzhova (KAZ)	O	O	O	O	O	XXX		1.88	
4	Netnapa Thaiking (THA)	O	O	O	XXX				1.80	
5	Yoko Ota (JPN)	–	–	XO	XXX				1.80	
6	Park Jin-hee (KOR)	O	O	XXX					1.75	
7	Kim Mi-ok (KOR)	O	XXO	–	XXX				1.75	
