= 2011 Asian Athletics Championships – Women's high jump =

The women's high jump at the 2011 Asian Athletics Championships was held at the Kobe Universiade Memorial Stadium on 1 July.

== Results ==
Rank	Athlete	Nationality	1.70	1.75	1.80	1.85	1.89	1.92	1.95	Result	Notes
1st place, gold medalist(s)	Zheng Xingjuan	China	–	–	o	o	xo	o	xxx	1.92	
2nd place, silver medalist(s)	Svetlana Radzivil	Uzbekistan	–	–	o	o	xxo	xxo	xxx	1.92	
3rd place, bronze medalist(s)	Marina Aitova	Kazakhstan	–	–	o	o	o	xxx		1.89	
4	Anna Ustinova	Kazakhstan	–	o	o	o	xxx			1.85	
5	Noengrothai Chaipetch	Thailand	o	xo	xo	o	xxx			1.85	
6	Wanida Boonwan	Thailand	o	o	o	xo	xxx			1.85	
7	Miyuki Fukumoto	Japan	o	o	o	xxx				1.80	
