= Beatrice Lundmark =

Swiss high jumper

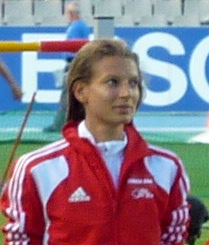
Beatrice Lundmark

Beatrice Lundmark (born 26 April 1980) is a Swiss high jumper. Her personal bests are 1.92 metres outdoors and 1.88 metres indoors.

== International competitions ==
Year	Competition	Venue	Position	Notes
Representing Switzerland
2005	Universiade	İzmir, Turkey	11th	1.70 m
2005	Jeux de la Francophonie	Niamey, Niger	3rd	1.79 m
2007	Universiade	Bangkok, Thailand	11th	1.80 m
2009	Jeux de la Francophonie	Beirut, Lebanon	2nd	1.84 m
2010	European Championships	Barcelona, Spain	10th	1.89 m
2011	European Indoor Championships	Paris, France	21st (q)	1.85 m
