= Wang Xueyi =

Chinese high jumper (born 1991)

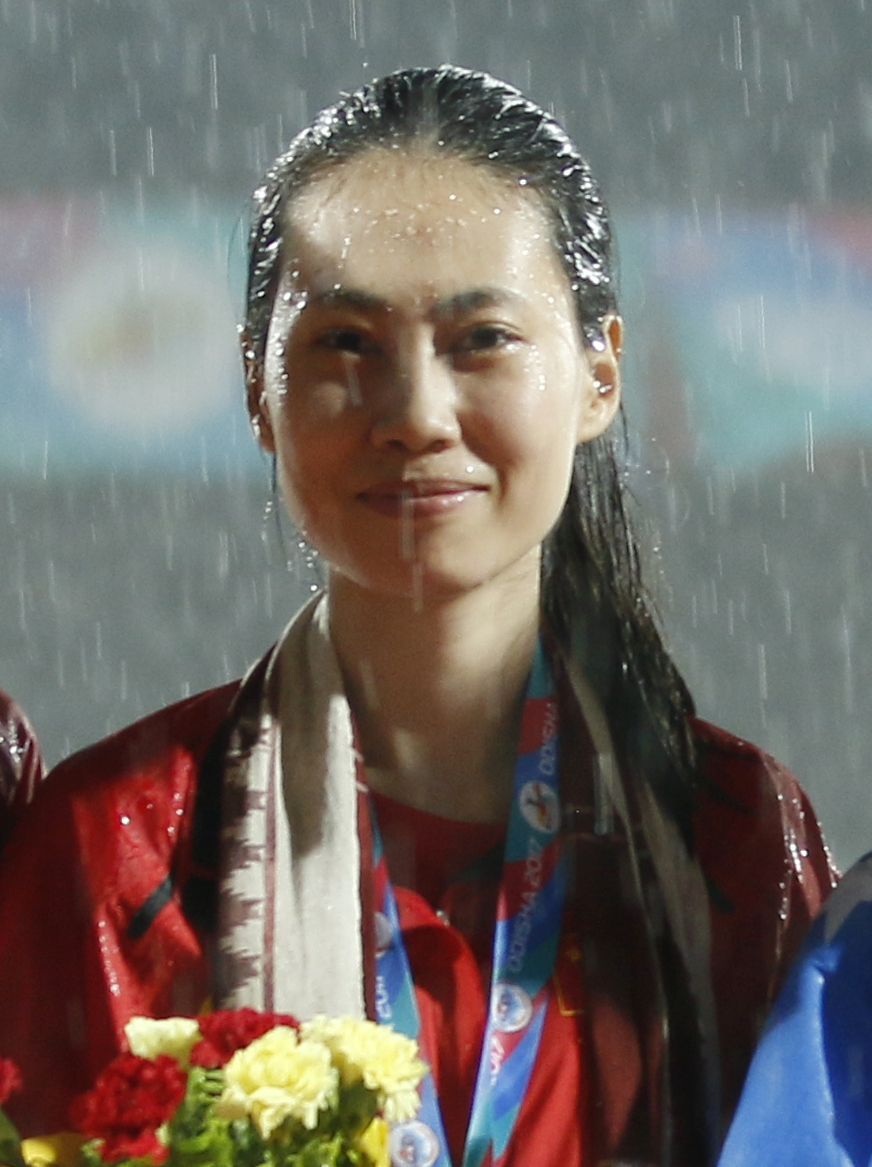
- Wang at the 2017 Asian Championships

Personal information
- Born: 3 August 1991 (age 34)
- Education: East China Normal University
- Height: 180 cm (5 ft 11 in)
- Weight: 58 kg (128 lb)

Sport
- Sport: Athletics
- Event: High jump
- Coached by: Huang Jianmin

Achievements and titles
- Personal best: 1.84 m (2016)
Medal record
Representing China
Asian Athletics Championships
Silver medal – second place	2017 Bhubaneswar	High jump

Wang Xueyi (Chinese: 王雪毅; born 3 August 1991) is a Chinese high jumper. She won a silver medal at the 2017 Asian Championships and placed fourth at the 2018 Asian Games.
