= 2007 Asian Athletics Championships – Women's high jump =

The women's high jump event at the 2007 Asian Athletics Championships was held in Amman, Jordan on July 28.

== Results ==
Rank	Name	Nationality	Result	Notes
1st place, gold medalist(s)	Tatyana Efimenko	Kyrgyzstan	1.94	=CR
2nd place, silver medalist(s)	Yekaterina Yevseyeva	Kazakhstan	1.91	
3rd place, bronze medalist(s)	Anna Ustinova	Kazakhstan	1.91	
4	Miyuki Aoyama	Japan	1.88	
5	Bui Thi Nhung	Vietnam	1.88	
6	Nadiya Dusanova	Uzbekistan	1.88	
7	Zahra Nabizadeh	Iran	1.75	
8	Sng Suat Li Michell	Singapore	1.70	
