= 2006 World Junior Championships in Athletics – Women's high jump =

The women's high jump event at the 2006 World Junior Championships in Athletics was held in Beijing, China, at Chaoyang Sports Centre on 18 and 20 August.

== Medalists ==
| Gold | Svetlana Radzivil; Uzbekistan |
| Silver | Zheng Xingjuan; China |
| Bronze | Annett Engel; Germany |
| Bronze | Yekaterina Yevseyeva; Kazakhstan |

== Results ==
=== Final ===
20 August

| Rank | Name | Nationality | Result | Notes |
|---|---|---|---|---|
| 1st place, gold medalist(s) | Svetlana Radzivil | Uzbekistan | 1.91 | |
| 2nd place, silver medalist(s) | Zheng Xingjuan | China | 1.88 | |
| 3rd place, bronze medalist(s) | Annett Engel | Germany | 1.84 | |
| 3rd place, bronze medalist(s) | Yekaterina Yevseyeva | Kazakhstan | 1.84 | |
| 5 | Ebba Jungmark | Sweden | 1.84 | |
| 6 | Jennifer Klein | Germany | 1.84 | |
| 7 | Viktoria Leks | Estonia | 1.84 | |
| 8 | Erika Viklund | Sweden | 1.80 | |
| 9 | Natalya Gapchuk | Ukraine | 1.80 | |
| 10 | Gema Martín-Pozuelo | Spain | 1.80 | |
| 11 | Nadiya Dusanova | Uzbekistan | 1.80 | |
| | Vikki Hubbard | United Kingdom | NH | |

=== Qualifications ===
18 August

==== Group A ====
| Rank | Name | Nationality | Result | Notes |
|---|---|---|---|---|
| 1 | Viktoria Leks | Estonia | 1.83 | Q |
| 2 | Yekaterina Yevseyeva | Kazakhstan | 1.83 | Q |
| 3 | Erika Viklund | Sweden | 1.83 | Q |
| 4 | Jennifer Klein | Germany | 1.83 | Q |
| 5 | Ebba Jungmark | Sweden | 1.83 | Q |
| 6 | Svetlana Radzivil | Uzbekistan | 1.83 | Q |
| 7 | Marisa Anselmo | Portugal | 1.81 | |
| 8 | Mirela Demireva | Bulgaria | 1.78 | |
| 8 | Jessica Leach | United Kingdom | 1.78 | |
| 8 | Yekaterina Kalyuzhina | Russia | 1.78 | |
| 11 | Tonje Angelsen | Norway | 1.74 | |

==== Group B ====
| Rank | Name | Nationality | Result | Notes |
|---|---|---|---|---|
| 1 | Zheng Xingjuan | China | 1.83 | Q |
| 2 | Annett Engel | Germany | 1.83 | Q |
| 3 | Natalya Gapchuk | Ukraine | 1.83 | Q |
| 4 | Gema Martín-Pozuelo | Spain | 1.83 | Q |
| 5 | Vikki Hubbard | United Kingdom | 1.81 | q |
| 5 | Nadiya Dusanova | Uzbekistan | 1.81 | q |
| 7 | Alesia Herasimava | Belarus | 1.81 | |
| 7 | Esthera Petre | Romania | 1.81 | |
| 9 | Øyunn Grindem Mogstad | Norway | 1.74 | |
| 9 | Rhonda Watkins | Trinidad and Tobago | 1.74 | |
| 9 | Patience Coleman | United States | 1.74 | |

== Participation ==
According to an unofficial count, 22 athletes from 17 countries participated in the event.

- Belarus (1)
- Bulgaria (1)
- China (1)
- Estonia (1)
- Germany (2)
- Kazakhstan (1)
- Norway (2)
- Portugal (1)
- Romania (1)
- Russia (1)
- Spain (1)
- Sweden (2)
- Trinidad and Tobago (1)
- Ukraine (1)
- United Kingdom (2)
- United States (1)
- Uzbekistan (2)
