= Viktoria Leks =

Estonian high jumper

Viktoria Leks (born September 28, 1987) is an Estonian high jumper and National Indoor Champion 2006–2007.

She competed at the 2007 European Indoor Championships without reaching the final round.

Her personal best outdoor jump is 1.89 metres, achieved in June 2007 in Türi and indoor 1.91 (this was the national record this time), achieved in February 2007 in Tallinn.

== Achievements ==
Year	Competition	Venue	Position	Notes
Representing Estonia
2006	World Junior Championships	Beijing, China	7th	1.84 m
2007	European Indoor Championships	Birmingham, United Kingdom	19th (q)	1.84 m
2007	European U23 Championships	Debrecen, Hungary	13th (q)	1.81 m
2007	Universiade	Bangkok, Thailand	5th	1.85 m
