= Athletics at the 1995 Summer Universiade – Women's triple jump =

The women's triple jump event at the 1995 Summer Universiade was held on 1 September at the Hakatanomori Athletic Stadium in Fukuoka, Japan.

== Results ==
| Rank | Athlete | Nationality | #1 | #2 | #3 | #4 | #5 | #6 | Result | Notes |
|---|---|---|---|---|---|---|---|---|---|---|
| 1st place, gold medalist(s) | Šárka Kašpárková | Czech Republic | 14.17 | x | 14.08 | x | 14.20 | x | 14.20 | =UR |
| 2nd place, silver medalist(s) | Lyudmila Dubkova | Russia | x | 13.87 | 12.47 | x | x | x | 13.87 | |
| 3rd place, bronze medalist(s) | Barbara Lah | Italy | 13.53 | x | 13.80 | 13.85 | x | 13.75 | 13.85 | |
| 4 | Olena Khlusovych | Ukraine | 13.65 | x | 13.75 | 13.61 | 13.64 | 13.19 | 13.75 | |
| 5 | Ilona Pazoła | Poland | 12.82 | 13.18 | 12.97 | 13.13 | x | 13.33 | 13.33 | |
| 6 | Silvija Babić | Croatia | x | 12.77 | 13.17 | 12.29 | 13.23 | 13.08 | 13.23 | |
| 7 | Tatyana Matyashova | Russia | x | 11.77 | 13.01 | x | x | x | 13.01 | |
| 8 | Tiombe Hurd | United States | x | 12.83 | 12.95 | x | 12.75 | 12.54 | 12.95 | |
| 9 | Yoko Ota | Japan | 12.85 | 12.88 | 12.45 | | | | 12.88 | |
| 10 | Kelly Dinsmore | Canada | x | 12.63w | x | | | | 12.63w | |
| 11 | Chantal Ouoba | Burkina Faso | 12.46 | 12.43 | 12.00 | | | | 12.46 | |
| 12 | Nicola Martial | Guyana | x | x | 12.36 | | | | 12.36 | |
| 13 | Billor Dulkadir | Turkey | 12.11 | 12.35 | 12.12 | | | | 12.35 | |
| 14 | Carla Shannon | United States | 12.34 | 12.34 | x | | | | 12.34 | |
| 15 | Michelle Hastick | Canada | 11.86 | x | x | | | | 11.86 | |
| | Moré Galetovic | Bolivia | x | x | x | | | | NM | |
| | Luciana dos Santos | Brazil | | | | | | | DNS | |
