= Zheng Xingjuan =

Chinese high jumper (born 1989)

Medal record

Women's athletics

Representing China

Asian Indoor Championships
Gold medal – first place	2012 Hangzhou	High jump
Silver medal – second place	2014 Hangzhou	High jump
Bronze medal – third place	2016 Doha	High jump

Zheng Xingjuan (born March 20, 1989, in Fuqing, Fujian, PR China) is a Chinese high jumper.

== Career ==
She started her international career at the 2005 World Championships without reaching the final. In 2006, she won the silver medal at the World Junior Championships and the bronze medal at the Asian Games.

She won the high jump event at the 2009 Asian Athletics Championships in Guangzhou and again at the 2011 event in Kobe. Further she ended 5th at the 2010 World Indoor Championships in Doha and 6th at the 2011 World Championships in Athletics in Daegu (5th after competitor disqualification).

== Progression ==
She had some progression in her personal best over the last seasons. Her outdoor best is 1.95 m which she crossed first in 2009 in Jinan and again in 2011 at the Daegu world championships. Indoors she has jumped 1.94 m at the world championships in Doha. The Chinese record is currently held by Jin Ling with 1.97 metres.

== Achievements ==
Year	Competition	Venue	Position	Notes
Representing China
2005	World Championships	Helsinki, Finland	25th (q)	1.84 m
2005	East Asian Games	Macau	2nd	1.85 m
2006	Asian Games	Doha, Qatar	2nd	1.91 m
2006	World Junior Championships	Beijing, China	2nd	1.88 m
2008	World Indoor Championships	Valencia, Spain	11th (q)	1.90 m
2008	Olympic Games	Beijing, China	22nd (q)	1.89 m
2009	Asian Indoor Games	Hanoi, Vietnam	4th	1.89 m
2009	Asian Championships	Guangzhou, China	1st	1.93 m
2009	East Asian Games	Hong Kong	1st	1.88 m
2010	World Indoor Championships	Doha, Qatar	5th	1.94 m
2010	Asian Games	Guangzhou, China	3rd	1.90 m
2011	Asian Championships	Kobe, Japan	1st	1.92 m
2011	World Championships	Daegu, South Korea	5th	1.93 m
2012	Asian Indoor Championships	Hangzhou, China	1st	1.92 m
2012	World Indoor Championships	Istanbul, Turkey	13th (q)	1.88 m
2013	World Championships	Moscow, Russia	9th	1.93 m
2014	Asian Indoor Championships	Hangzhou, China	2nd	1.91 m
2014	Asian Games	Incheon, South Korea	2nd	1.92 m
2015	Asian Championships	Wuhan, China	3rd	1.84 m
2015	World Championships	Beijing, China	26th (q)	1.80 m
2016	Asian Indoor Championships	Doha, Qatar	3rd	1.84 m
