= Someshwar, Karkala taluk =

Someshwara
- village
- Location in Karnataka, India
- Coordinates: 13.5°N 75.07°E
- Country: India
- State: Karnataka
- District: Udupi
- Elevation: 338 m (1,109 ft)

Population (1000)
  - Total: 1,500

Languages
  - Official: Kannada
- Time zone: UTC+5:30 (IST)

Someshwara is a village in Karkala taluk in the Indian state of Karnataka.

== Geography ==
Someshwara, in Karnataka, is a village in Hebri taluk, at the foothills of Agumbe ghat section and about 11 km from Hebri town. Name can be traced by the Somanath temple in the town. There is also a Maha Ganapathi temple right opposite to the bus stand in the town.

It is a main junction for Mangalore, Udupi, Hebri, Kundapur and Shimoga.

== Noted people ==
Noted social worker and Karnataka Rajyotsava awardee Gururaj Hebbar is from Someshwara.
