= Noengrothai Chaipetch =

Thai high jumper (born 1982)

Personal information
- Nationality: Thai
- Born: 1 December 1982 (age 43)

Sport
- Sport: Track and Field
- Event: High jump

Achievements and titles
- Personal bests: Outdoor: High jump: 1.94 m (2009) Indoor: High jump: 1.93 m (2009)
Medal record
Women's athletics
Representing Thailand
Asian Championships
Bronze medal – third place	2003 Manila	1.84 m
Asian Indoor Games
Gold medal – first place	2005 Bangkok	1.88 m
Gold medal – first place	2007 Macau
Southeast Asian Games
Bronze medal – third place	2005 Manila	1.83 m
Silver medal – second place	2007 Nakhon Ratchasima	1.86 m
Gold medal – first place	2009 Vientiane	1.94 m

Noengrothai Chaipetch (Thai: หนึ่งฤทัย ไชยเพชร; RTGS: Nueng-rue-thai Chaipet, born 1 December 1982) is a female high jumper from Thailand. Her personal best jump is 1.94 metres, achieved in December 2009 in Vientiane, Laos.

She won the bronze medal at the 2003 Asian Championships. She also competed at the 2004 and 2008 Summer Olympics without reaching the final.

== International competitions ==
Year	Competition	Venue	Position	Notes
Representing Thailand
2003	Asian Championships	Manila, Philippines	3rd	1.84 m
2004	Olympic Games	Athens, Greece	21st (q)	1.89 m
2005	Asian Indoor Games	Bangkok, Thailand	1st	1.88 m
2005	Southeast Asian Games	Manila, Philippines	3rd	1.83 m
2006	Asian Games	Doha, Qatar	8th	1.84 m
2007	Universiade	Bangkok, Thailand	15th (q)	1.70 m
2007	Asian Indoor Games	Macau	1st	1.91 m
2007	Southeast Asian Games	Nakhon Ratchasima, Thailand	2nd	1.86 m
2008	Olympic Games	Beijing, China	29th (q)	1.80 m
2009	Universiade	Belgrade, Serbia	6th	1.85 m
2009	World Championships	Berlin, Germany	26th (q)	1.89 m
2009	Asian Championships	Guangzhou, China	6th	1.84 m
2009	Southeast Asian Games	Vientiane, Laos	1st	1.94 m
2010	Asian Games	Guangzhou, China	5th	1.87 m
2011	Asian Championships	Kobe, Japan	5th	1.85 m
