= Cecilia Yeung Man-wai =

Hong Kong high jumper (born 1994)

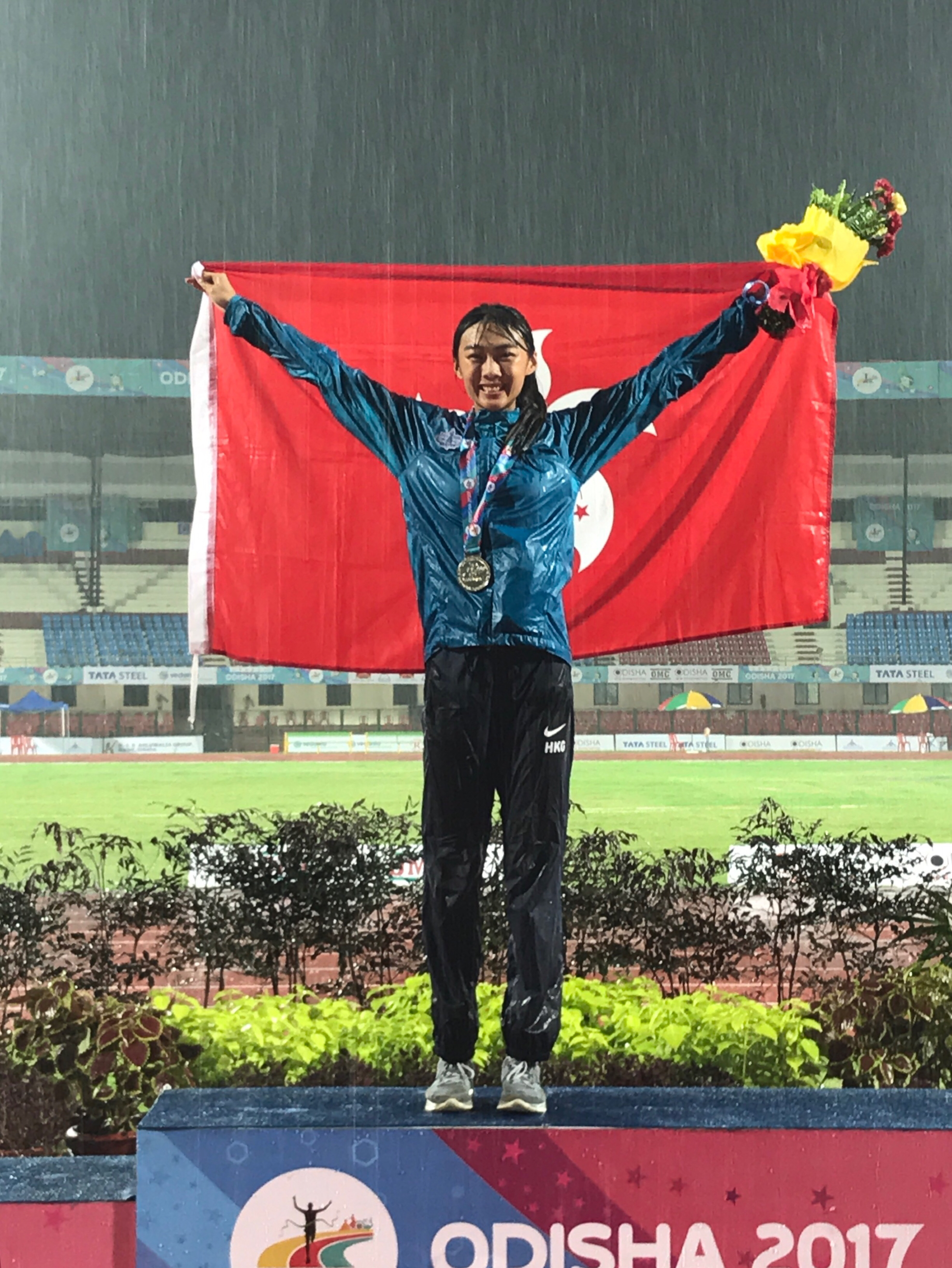
- Yeung at the 2017 Asian Championships

Personal information
- Native name: 楊文蔚
- Born: Cecilia Yeung Man-wai; 18 September 1994 (age 31) Tai Wai, British Hong Kong
- Education: University of Hong Kong
- Height: 173 cm (5 ft 8 in)
- Weight: 56 kg (123 lb)

Sport
- Sport: Athletics
- Event: High jump
- Coached by: Wen Da Yong

Achievements and titles
- Personal best: 1.88 m (2017)
Medal record
Representing Hong Kong
Asian Athletics Championships
Silver medal – second place	2017 Bhubaneswar	High jump

Cecilia Yeung Man-wai (楊文蔚; born 18 September 1994) is a high jumper from Hong Kong. She won a silver medal at the 2017 Asian Championships and placed fifth at the 2018 Asian Games.
