= Tatyana Efimenko =

Kyrgyzstani high jumper (born 1981)

Personal information
- Born: 2 January 1981 (age 45) Frunze, Kyrgyz SSR, Soviet Union

Sport
- Sport: Track and field
Medal record
Representing Kyrgyzstan
Asian Games
Gold medal – first place	2002 Busan	High jump
Silver medal – second place	2006 Doha	High jump
Asian Championships
Gold medal – first place	2002 Colombo	High jump
Gold medal – first place	2005 Incheon	High jump
Gold medal – first place	2007 Amman	High jump
Bronze medal – third place	2000 Jakarta	High jump
Asian Indoor Championships
Gold medal – first place	2008 Doha	High jump
Silver medal – second place	2006 Pattaya	High jump

Tatyana Efimenko (Russian: Татьяна Александровна Ефименко; born 2 January 1981 in ) is a female high jumper from Kyrgyzstan. Her personal best jump is 1.97 metres, achieved in July 2003 in Rome.

She won the bronze medal at the 1998 World Junior Championships and finished fifth at the 2002 IAAF World Cup. She competed at the World Championships in 1999 and 2005 without reaching the finals there. At the Olympic Games she exited in the qualifying round in 2000 and 2004, failing to clear the opening height in the former. On the regional level she won the Asian Championships in 2002 and 2005 as well as the 2002 Asian Games. She took the silver medal at the 2006 Asian Games.

== Achievements ==
Year	Competition	Venue	Position	Notes
Representing Kyrgyzstan
1997	Asian Junior Championships	Bangkok, Thailand	1st	1.77 m
1998	World Junior Championships	Annecy, France	3rd	1.84 m
1998	Asian Games	Bangkok, Thailand	4th	1.84 m
1999	World Championships	Seville, Spain	32nd (q)	1.80 m
1999	Asian Junior Championships	Singapore	1st	1.88 m
2000	Asian Championships	Jakarta, Indonesia	3rd	1.80 m
2000	Olympic Games	Sydney, Australia	– (q)	NM
2002	Asian Championships	Colombo, Sri Lanka	1st	1.92 m
2002	Asian Games	Busan, South Korea	1st	1.90 m
2003	World Indoor Championships	Birmingham, United Kingdom	12th (q)	1.90 m
2004	Olympic Games	Athens, Greece	23rd (q)	1.89 m
2005	World Championships	Helsinki, Finland	– (q)	NM
2005	Asian Championships	Incheon, South Korea	1st	1.92 m
2006	Asian Indoor Championships	Pattaya, Thailand	2nd	1.91 m
2006	World Indoor Championships	Moscow, Russia	16th (q)	1.86 m
2006	Asian Games	Doha, Qatar	2nd	1.91 m
2007	Asian Championships	Amman, Jordan	1st	1.94 m
2008	Asian Indoor Championships	Doha, Qatar	1st	1.91 m
2008	World Indoor Championships	Valencia, Spain	17th (q)	1.81 m
2008	Olympic Games	Beijing, China	– (q)	NM
2009	Asian Championships	Guangzhou, China	4th	1.87 m
2010	Asian Games	Guangzhou, China	5th	1.87 m
