= Uzbekistan at the 2023 World Athletics Championships =

- Flag of Uzbekistan
- WA code: UZB

in Budapest, Hungary 19 August 2023 – 27 August 2023
- Competitors: 5 (1 man and 4 women)
- Medals: Gold 0 Silver 0 Bronze 0 Total 0

World Athletics Championships appearances
- 1993; 1995; 1997; 1999; 2001; 2003; 2005; 2007; 2009; 2011; 2013; 2015; 2017; 2019; 2022; 2023

Uzbekistan competed at the 2023 World Athletics Championships in Budapest, Hungary, from 19 to 27 August 2023.

== Results ==
Uzbekistan entered 5 athletes.

Key

- Q = Qualified for the next round
- q = Qualified for the next round as a fastest loser or, in field events, by position without achieving the qualifying target
- NR = National record
- PB = Personal best
- SB = Season best
- N/A = Round not applicable for the event

=== Men ===
Field events

Athlete	Event	Qualification		Final	
Athlete	Event	Distance	Position	Distance	Position
Anvar Anvarov	Long jump	NM		Did not advance	

=== Women ===
Field events

Athlete	Event	Qualification		Final	
Athlete	Event	Distance	Position	Distance	Position
Safina Sadullayeva	High jump	1.80	=29	Did not advance	
Sharifa Davronova	Triple jump	13.66	24	Did not advance	

Combined events – Heptathlon

Athlete	Event	100H	HJ	SP	200 m	LJ	JT	800 m	Final	Rank
Ekaterina Voronina	Result	14.77	1.77	13.15	25.48	5.71	50.02	2:14.03	5922	16
Ekaterina Voronina	Points	872	941	737	843	762	861	906	5922	16
