= Bobby Aloysius =

Indian high jumper

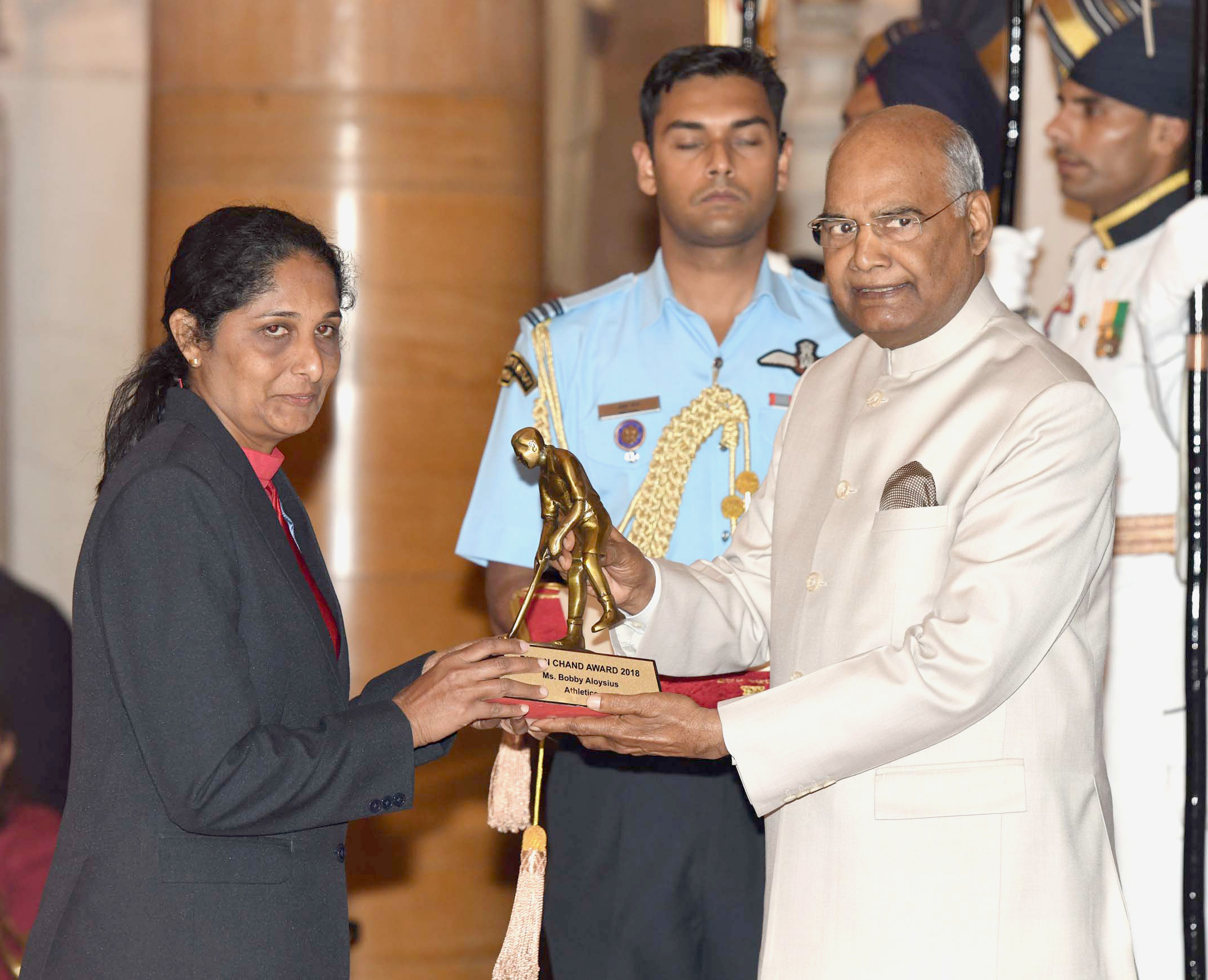
- The President, Shri Ram Nath Kovind presenting the Dhyan Chand Award, 2018 to Bobby Aloysius

Personal information
- Nationality: Indian
- Born: June 22, 1974 (age 52) Chemperi, Kannur, Kerala, India

Sport
- Country: India
- Sport: Athletics
Medal record
Women's athletics
Representing India
Asian Games
Silver medal – second place	2002 Busan	High jump
Asian Championships
Gold medal – first place	2000 Jakarta	High jump
Silver medal – second place	2002 Colombo	High jump
Asian Indoor Championships
Silver medal – second place	2004 Tehran	High jump

Bobby Aloysius (born 22 June 1974) is an Indian athlete from Kerala, who competes in the high jump event. Currently, she is residing in Thiruvananthapuram, Kerala. She held the Indian and South Asian records in high jump between 1995 and 2012 of 1.91m. Bobby participated in the 2004 Athens Olympics, won silver in 2002 Busan Asian Games and won gold in the Jakarta Asian Championships.

== Personal life ==
Bobby was born in Chemperi, Kannur, Kerala, India. Bobby travelled around the world several times and eventually lived in Shrewsbury, United Kingdom until 2009. She had also worked as the Assistant Secretary (Technical) of Kerala State Sports Council in Thiruvananthapuram till 2013. She is married to Shajan Skariah, who is the founder and chief newsreader of an online channel named Marunadan TV. They have three children, Stefan Holm Skariah, Gangotri Skariah and Ritwik Skariah. She is an alumnus of Calicut University.

== Career ==
Bobby established the national record of 1.91m in women's high jump during the Olympic qualifications in 2004 in Chennai. “I badly wanted to qualify for the Olympics and I put everything into that jump in Chennai and cleared 1.91m," she said in an interview at the Maharaja's Stadium in 2011. Her national record remained unbeaten till 2012, when Sahana Kumari cleared 1.92 m for the London Olympics. Bobby also won the women's High Jump event at the National Domestic Circuit Meet held in 2003 in Chennai, in addition to her international wins.

Year	Competition	Venue	Position	Notes
Representing India
2000	Asian Championships	Jakarta, Indonesia	1st	1.83 m
2002	Commonwealth Games	Manchester, United Kingdom	4th	1.87 m
2002	Asian Championships	Colombo, Sri Lanka	2nd	1.84 m
2002	Asian Games	Busan, South Korea	2nd	1.88 m
2003	Asian Championships	Manila, Philippines	4th	1.80 m
2003	Afro-Asian Games	Hyderabad, India	2nd	1.88 m
2004	Asian Indoor Championships	Tehran, Iran	2nd	1.81 m
2004	Olympic Games	Athens, Greece	28th (q)	1.85 m

Bobby has also worked with the Kerala state government to improve sports development in her state. Serving as the Assistant Secretary (Technical) of Kerala State Sports Council, Bobby organised the Sports Council's High Jump Carnival, held at Thiruvananthapuram with the athletes performing to heavy music in 2011. She aimed to implement the higher secondary sports quota online allotment scheme during her service. In 2013, she submitted her resignation letter to KSSC as she claimed that they had denied her the opportunity to get appointed to the National Games Office by holding back the order.

== Awards ==
After applying for the Dhyan Chand Award multiple times and losing the chance to receive it, Bobby was finally awarded with it in 2018. She was presented the award on 25 September by the President of India Ram Nath Kovind at Rashtrapati Bhawan. In one of her interviews, she said "I'm lucky to win it this time. I've been applying for this honour ever since Dhyan Chand Award was instituted in 2002.The honour will motivate me to take coaching seriously. After Nayana James left me after just one year of training under me, I stopped coaching. Now, I am planning to make a comeback to serious coaching."
