= Wanida Boonwan =

Thai high jumper

Wanida Boonwan (Thai: วนิดา บุญวรรณ; born 30 August 1986 in Ubon Ratchathani) is a Thai athlete competing in the high jump. She competed at the 2012 Summer Olympics failing to qualify for the final.

Her personal bests in the event are 1.92 metres outdoors (Kunshan 2011) and 1.91 metres indoors (Hanoi 2009).

== International competitions ==
Year	Competition	Venue	Position	Notes
Representing Thailand
2002	Asian Junior Championships	Bangkok, Thailand	5th	1.65 m
2007	Universiade	Bangkok, Thailand	7th	1.85 m
2007	Asian Indoor Games	Macau	5th	1.80 m
2007	Southeast Asian Games	Nakhon Ratchasima, Thailand	3rd	1.84 m
2009	Asian Indoor Games	Hanoi, Vietnam	3rd	1.91 m
2009	Southeast Asian Games	Vientiane, Laos	2nd	1.88 m
2010	Asian Games	Guangzhou, China	7th	1.84 m
2011	Asian Championships	Kobe, Japan	6th	1.85 m
2011	Universiade	Shenzhen, China	7th	1.86 m
2011	World Championships	Daegu, South Korea	22nd (q)	1.85 m
2011	Southeast Asian Games	Palembang, Indonesia	2nd	1.87 m
2012	Olympic Games	London, United Kingdom	29th (q)	1.80 m
2013	Asian Championships	Pune, India	8th	1.81 m
2013	Southeast Asian Games	Naypyidaw, Myanmar	2nd	1.80 m
2014	Asian Games	Incheon, South Korea	5th	1.85 m
2015	Southeast Asian Games	Singapore	1st	1.85 m
2017	Asian Championships	Bhubaneswar, India	5th	1.80 m
2017	Southeast Asian Games	Kuala Lumpur, Malaysia	4th	1.83 m
2017	Asian Indoor and Martial Arts Games	Ashgabat, Turkmenistan	4th	1.79 m
2018	Asian Games	Jakarta, Indonesia	9th	1.75 m
