= Phạm Thị Diễm =

Vietnamese high jumper

Personal information
- Born: 24 January 1990 (age 36)

Sport
- Sport: Athletics
- Event: High jump
Medal record
Women's athletics
Representing Vietnam
Southeast Asian Games
Bronze medal – third place	2011 Palembang	High jump

Phạm Thị Diễm (born 24 January 1990 in Thạnh Phú, Bến Tre) is a Vietnamese high jumper.

She finished seventh at the 2014 Asian Games.

Her personal best jump is 1.91 metres, achieved in May 2013 in Taipei.
