= Sitora Hamidova =

Uzbekistani long-distance runner

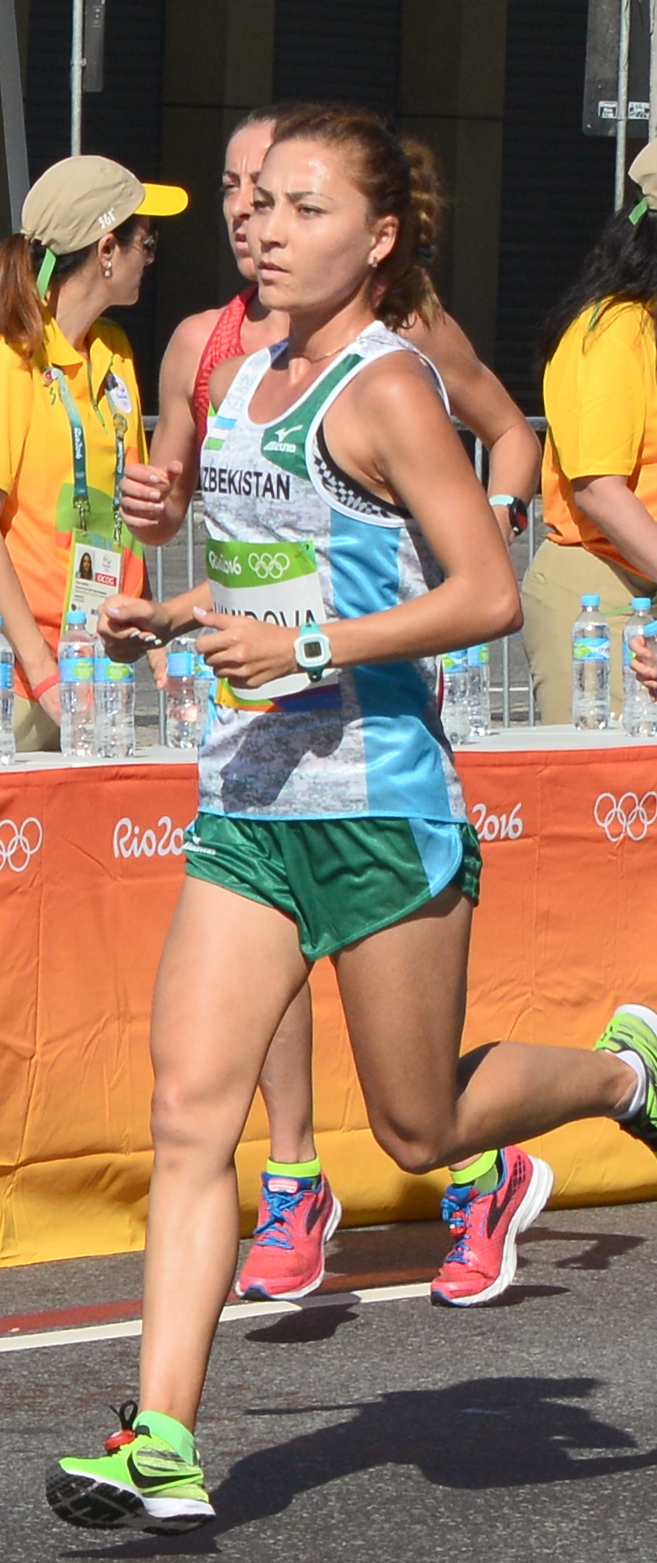
- Hamidova at the 2016 Olympics

Personal information
- Born: 12 May 1989 (age 37) Termez, Uzbek SSR, Soviet Union
- Education: Termez State University
- Height: 164 cm (5 ft 5 in)
- Weight: 50 kg (110 lb)

Sport
- Country: Uzbekistan
- Sport: Track and field
- Event: 5000 m – marathon

Achievements and titles
- Personal best(s): 5000 m – 15:50.26 (2011); 10,000 m – 31:57.77 (2016); HM – 1:15:12 (2011) marathon – 2:39:45 (2016)
- Updated on 2 September 2015

Sitora Jumanazarovna Hamidova (Uzbek Cyrillic: Ситора Жуманазаровна Ҳамидова; born 12 May 1989) is an Uzbekistani long-distance runner. She competed in the marathon at the 2015 World Championships and 2016 Olympics.

== Biography ==
Sitora Hamidova was born on May 12, 1989 in the city of Termez, Surkhandarya region. Sje graduated from Termez State University.

In 2015, Sitora became the winner of the Uzbekistan Championship in 10,000 meters, and in 2016, the Uzbekistan Championship in cross.

She became part of the Uzbekistan national team at the 2016 Summer Olympic Games in Rio de Janeiro. In the 10,000-meter run, she was 2 minutes 40.32 seconds slower than Ethiopian Almaz Ayana, who won the gold medal, and took 24th place with Uzbekistan's record - 31 minutes 57.77 seconds. In the marathon, Sitora Hamidova took the 54th place among 133 participants who showed the best personal result with 2 hours 39 minutes 45 seconds. Hamidova lost to the winner - Kenyan Jemima Sumgong with 15 minutes and 41 seconds.

She participated in world championships three times. In 2015-2019, she could not reach the finish line in the marathon, in 2017 she took 18th place in the 10,000 meters race (with the result of 31.57.42 seconds) which is the record of Uzbekistan.

Hamidova took 8th place in the 5000 and 10000 meters at the 2018 Summer Asian Games in Jakarta.

She became the current record holder of Uzbekistan in 10,000 meters (with a result of 31.57.42) and half marathon (with a result of 1:13.10).

Master of sports of international category in Uzbekistan.
