= Sahana Kumari =

Indian high jumper (born 1981)

Personal information
- Full name: Sahana Kumari Nagaraj Gobbargumpi
- Born: 6 March 1981 (age 45) Kotekar, Karnataka, India

Sport
- Sport: Track and field
- Event: High jump

Achievements and titles
- Personal bests: 1.92 m NR (2012)
Medal record
Women's athletics
Representing India
South Asian Games
Gold medal – first place	2016 Guwahati	High jump
Silver medal – second place	2004 Islamabad	High jump
Silver medal – second place	2010 Dhaka	High jump
Asian Indoor Championships
Bronze medal – third place	2004 Tehran	High jump

Sahana Kumari Nagaraj Gobbargumpi (born 6 March 1982) is an Indian former high jumper. She represented India in women's high jump event at the 2012 London Olympics. Kumari holds the high jump national record of 1.92 m, set in 2012.

== Personal life ==
Sahana was born in Kotekar, Karnataka. She attended Anandashram High School in Someshwar, where she actively participated in sports such as kabaddi, kho-kho, and high jump. She credits her school for encouraging her to pursue athletics. She graduated from Sri Gokarnanatheshwara College, Mangaluru, in 2002.

Her father, who served in the Indian Air Force, coached her in high jump during her early years. Her elder sister, Harshini, is a former athlete, and her brother played volleyball.

Sahana was previously employed as a senior clerk with the South Western Railway Zone of Indian Railways and later became a coach with the Sports Authority of India. She is married to national-level athlete B. G. Nagaraj, and their daughter, Pavana Nagaraj, is a heptathlete.

== 2012 Summer Olympics ==
Sahana was the last Indian athlete to qualify for the London Games. She earned the B standard Olympic berth at the 52nd National Inter-State Senior Athletics Championships held in G. M. C. Balayogi Athletic Stadium, Hyderabad, from 23 to 26 June 2012. She broke an eight-year-old national record of 1.91 m set by Keralite Bobby Aloysius.

My coach will offer valuable feedback about my competitors and help me train. I need him to accompany me. But I am a central government employee, with a salary of Rs 25,000. I can’t afford the burden of five lakh.

— Sahana Kumari

Sahana had wanted her Ukrainian coach Nikhil Evgeny to accompany her to the Games but the National Olympic Committee of India, Indian Olympic Association, had only sanctioned a quota of five athletic coaches. The Athletics Federation of India approved chief national athletic coach Bahadur Singh Chouhan, R.K. Gandhi, recommended by three qualified racewalkers, and the personal coaches of Tintu Luka, Vikas Gowda, and Krishna Poonia.

Sahana was unable to reimburse the travelling expenses of her coach. A non-governmental organisation, Ek Aur Prayaas contributed funds for her coach to travel to London.

On 8 August 2012, Sahana was eliminated from the women's high jump competition at the Olympic Games when she failed to clear 1.85 m.
