= Svetlana Radzivil =

Uzbek high jumper (born 1987)

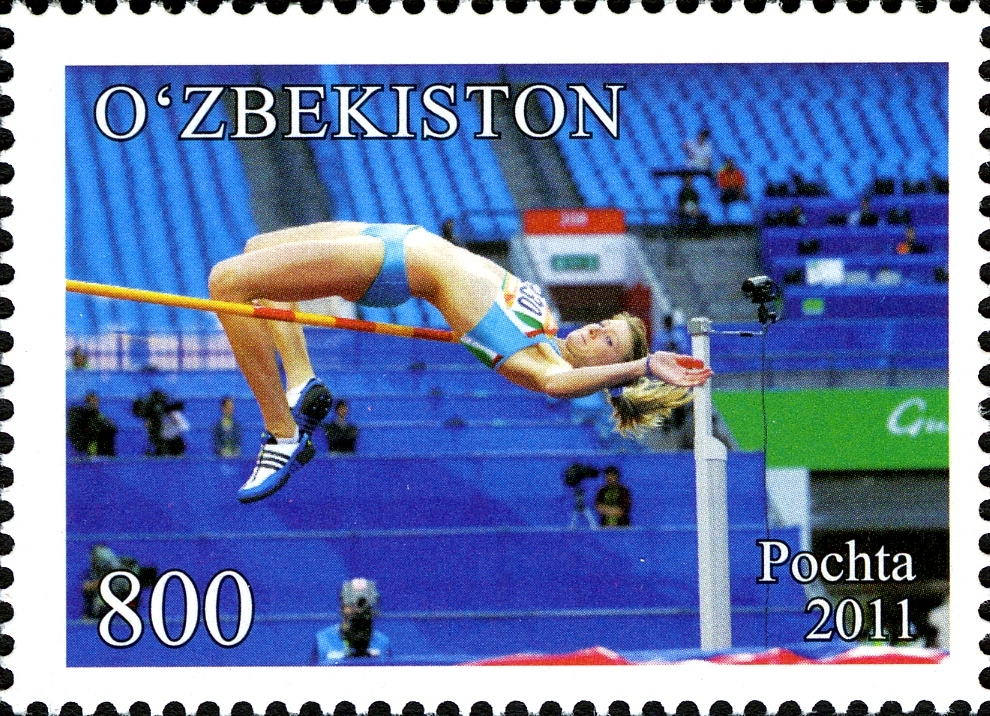
- Radzivil on a 2011 postage stamp of Uzbekistan

Personal information
- Born: January 17, 1987 (age 39) Tashkent, Uzbek SSR, Soviet Union (now Uzbekistan)
- Height: 1.86 m (6 ft 1 in)
- Weight: 61 kg (134 lb)

Sport
- Country: Uzbekistan
- Sport: Athletics
- Event: High jump
Medal record
Women's athletics
Representing Uzbekistan
Asian Games
Gold medal – first place	2010 Guangzhou	High jump
Gold medal – first place	2014 Incheon	High jump
Gold medal – first place	2018 Jakarta-Palembang	High jump
Silver medal – second place	2022 Hangzhou	High jump
Asian Indoor Championships
Gold medal – first place	2014 Hangzhou	High jump
Gold medal – first place	2016 Doha	High jump
Bronze medal – third place	2006 Pattaya	High jump
World U20 Championships
Gold medal – first place	2006 Beijing	High jump

Svetlana Mikhaylovna Radzivil (Russian: Светлана Михайловна Радзивил; born 17 January 1987 in Tashkent, Uzbek SSR) is an Uzbekistani former high jumper. She is among Asia's top female high jumpers. She won the Asian Games title three times running (2010 to 2018) and was the Asian champion in 2015. She has also won two silver and one bronze medal at the Asian Athletics Championships. She is a two-time champion at the Asian Indoor Athletics Championships (2006 and 2014). She is a four-time Olympian (2008, 2012, 2016 and 2021).

== Career ==
She was born in Tashkent. She finished ninth at the 2003 World Youth Championships and thirteenth at the 2004 World Junior Championships. In 2006, she won the 2006 World Junior Championships, in a new personal best jump of 1.91 metres, and finished seventh at the 2006 Asian Games. She jumped 1.91 again in 2007. In 2008, she competed at the Olympic Games. She won the gold medal at the 17th Asian Games with a jump of 1.94 metres ahead of China's Xingjuan Zheng who claimed silver with her season's best jump of 1.92 m and Uzbekistan's Nadiya Dusanova who took home the bronze with a best leap of 1.89 m. She won gold medal in Asian Games 2018, with games record of 1.96 meters beating Nadiya Dusanova 1.94 m.

Her personal best jump is 1.97 metres, achieved in August 2012 in London and in April 2021 in Mersin.

On December 22, 2019, Svetlana Radzivil was elected to the Tashkent City Kengash of People's Deputies.

== International competitions ==
Year	Competition	Venue	Position	Notes
Representing Uzbekistan
2002	World Junior Championships	Kingston, Jamaica	19th (q)	1.70 m
2002	Asian Junior Championships	Bangkok, Thailand	4th	1.76 m
2003	World Youth Championships	Sherbrooke, Canada	9th	1.75 m
2003	Asian Championships	Manila, Philippines	6th	1.75 m
2004	Asian Junior Championships	Ipoh, Malaysia	2nd	1.80 m
2004	World Junior Championships	Grosseto, Italy	13th	1.75 m
2006	Asian Indoor Championships	Pattaya, Thailand	1st	1.91 m
2006	Asian Junior Championships	Macau	1st	1.90 m
2006	World Junior Championships	Beijing, China	1st	1.91 m
2006	Asian Games	Doha, Qatar	7th	1.84 m
2008	Olympic Games	Beijing, China	18th (q)	1.89 m
2009	World Championships	Berlin, Germany	21st (q)	1.89 m
2009	Asian Indoor Games	Hanoi, Vietnam	4th	1.87 m
2009	Asian Championships	Guangzhou, China	3rd	1.87 m
2010	Asian Games	Guangzhou, China	1st	1.95 m
2011	Asian Championships	Kobe, Japan	2nd	1.92 m
2011	World Championships	Daegu, South Korea	7th	1.93 m
2012	World Indoor Championships	Istanbul, Turkey	8th	1.92 m
2012	Olympic Games	London, United Kingdom	7th	1.97 m
2013	Asian Championships	Pune, India	2nd	1.88 m
2014	Asian Indoor Championships	Hangzhou, China	1st	1.96 m
2014	World Indoor Championships	Sopot, Poland	14th (q)	1.88 m
2014	Asian Games	Incheon, South Korea	1st	1.94 m
2015	Asian Championships	Wuhan, China	1st	1.91 m
2015	World Championships	Beijing, China	9th	1.88 m
2016	Asian Indoor Championships	Doha, Qatar	1st	1.92 m
2016	Olympic Games	Rio de Janeiro, Brazil	13th	1.88 m
2018	Asian Games	Jakarta-Palembang, Indonesia	1st	1.96 m
2019	Asian Championships	Doha, Qatar	3rd	1.88 m
2019	World Championships	Doha, Qatar	12th	1.89 m
2021	Olympic Games	Tokyo, Japan	20th (q)	1.90 m
2022	World Indoor Championships	Belgrade, Serbia	10th	1.84 m
2022	Islamic Solidarity Games	Konya, Turkey	2nd	1.87 m
2023	Asian Championships	Bangkok, Thailand	3rd	1.83 m
2023	Asian Games	Hangzhou, China	2nd	1.86 m
2024	Asian Indoor Championships	Tehran, Iran	5th	1.80 m
