= Marina Aitova =

Kazakhstani high jumper (born 1982)

Maria Aitova
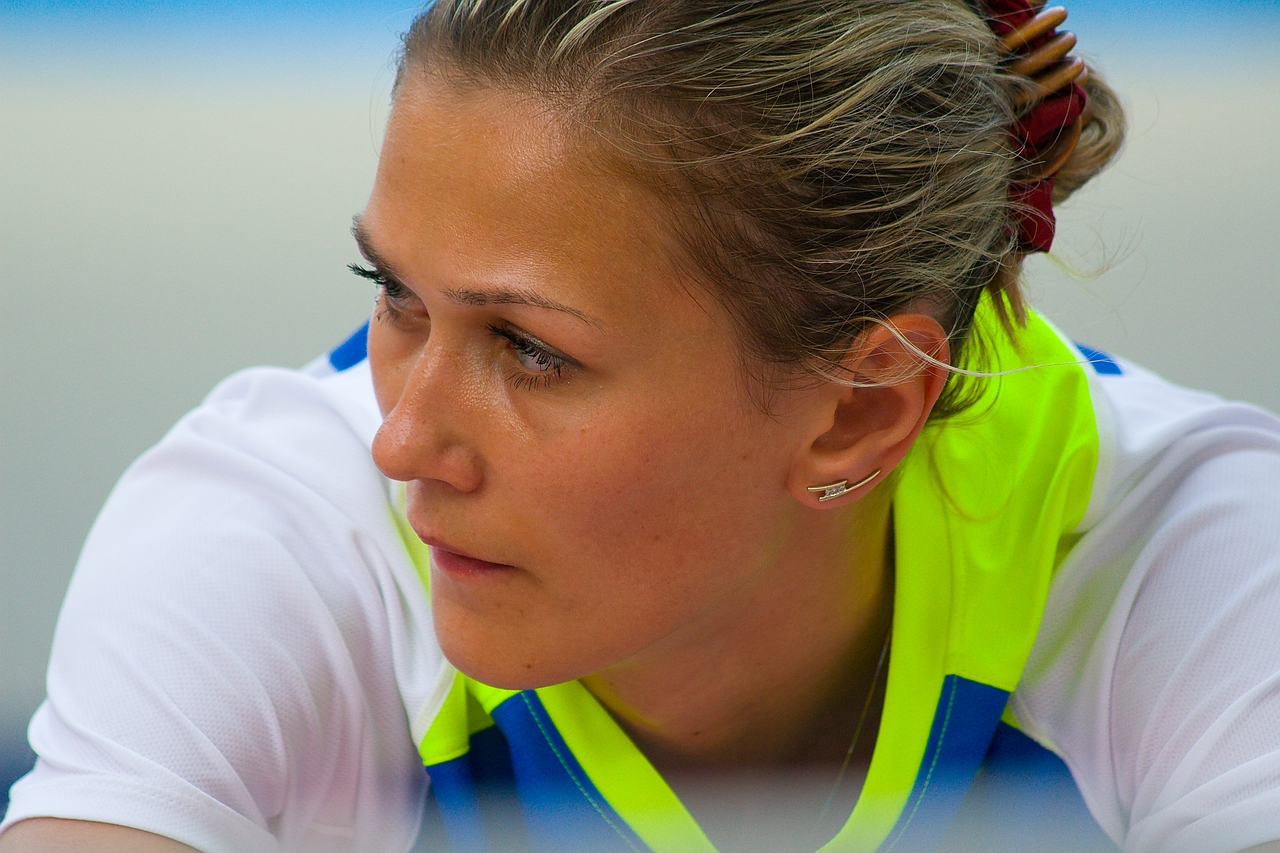
- Aitova in 2008

Personal information
- Full name: Marina Aleksandrovna Aitova (Korzhova-)
- Born: Марина Александровна Аитова (Коржова-); September 13, 1982 (age 43) Karaganda, Kazakh SSR, Soviet Union
- Education: Karaganda Economic University
- Height: 178 cm (5 ft 10 in)
- Weight: 59 kg (130 lb)

Sport
- Country: Kazakhstan
- Sport: Athletics
- Event: High Jump
- Coached by: Mikhail Frolov
Medal record
Women's athletics
Representing Kazakhstan
Asian Championships
Silver medal – second place	2000 Jakarta	High jump
Bronze medal – third place	2002 Colombo	High jump
Bronze medal – third place	2011 Kobe	High jump
Bronze medal – third place	2013 Pune	High jump
Asian Indoor Championships
Gold medal – first place	2006 Pattaya	High jump
Gold medal – first place	2010 Teheran	High jump

Marina Aleksandrovna Aitova, née Korzhova (born 13 September 1982) is a Kazakhstani high jumper. Her personal best jump is 1.99 metres, achieved in July 2009 in Athens.

== Biography ==
Born in Karaganda, Kazakh SSR, Soviet Union, Aitova made her first appearances on the world stage in 2003, competing at the 2003 IAAF World Indoor Championships and the 2003 World Championships in Athletics, but she did not get beyond the qualifiers in either competition. Aitova represented her country at the 2004 Summer Olympics, but again she failed to progress beyond the qualifying round. She competed at the 2007 World Championships and finished seventh in the final. In 2008, she took fifth place in the IAAF World Indoor Championships in Athletics and attended the 2008 Beijing Olympics, finishing tenth overall. She made her second World Championships appearance at 2009 World Championships in Athletics, but did not make the final cut. She won the gold at the 2010 Asian Indoor Athletics Championships, equalling the championship record of 1.93 metres.

== Achievements ==
Year	Competition	Venue	Position	Notes
1999	World Youth Championships	Bydgoszcz, Poland	4th	1.79 m
1999	Asian Junior Championships	Singapore	4th	1.79 m
2000	World Junior Championships	Santiago, Chile	9th	1.80 m
2000	Asian Championships	Djakarta, Indonesia	2nd	1.83 m
2001	Asian Junior Championships	Bandar Seri Begawan, Brunei	1st	1.85 m
2002	Asian Championships	Colombo, Sri Lanka	3rd	1.84 m
2002	Asian Games	Busan, South Korea	=2nd	1.88 m
2003	World Indoor Championships	Birmingham, United Kingdom	17th (q)	1.87 m
2003	World Championships	Paris, France	23rd (q)	1.80 m
2003	Afro-Asian Games	Hyderabad, India	1st	1.88 m
2004	Olympic Games	Athens, Greece	31st (q)	1.85 m
2006	Asian Indoor Championships	Pattaya, Thailand	1st	1.93 m
2006	World Cup	Athens, Greece	3rd	1.94 m
2006	Asian Games	Doha, Qatar	1st	1.93 m
2007	Universiade	Bangkok, Thailand	1st	1.92 m
2007	World Championships	Osaka, Japan	7th	1.94 m
2008	World Indoor Championships	Valencia, Spain	5th	1.95 m
2008	Olympic Games	Beijing, China	7th	1.93 m
2009	World Championships	Berlin, Germany	13th (q)	1.92 m
2010	Asian Indoor Championships	Tehran, Iran	1st	1.93 m
2010	World Indoor Championships	Doha, Qatar	7th	1.91 m
2011	Asian Championships	Kobe, Japan	3rd	1.89 m
2011	World Championships	Daegu, South Korea	19th (q)	1.89 m
2012	Olympic Games	London, United Kingdom	–	NM
2013	Asian Championships	Pune, India	3rd	1.88 m
2013	World Championships	Moscow, Russia	25th (q)	1.83 m
2014	Asian Games	Incheon, South Korea	4th	1.85 m
