= Nadiya Dusanova =

Uzbekistani high jumper (born 1987)

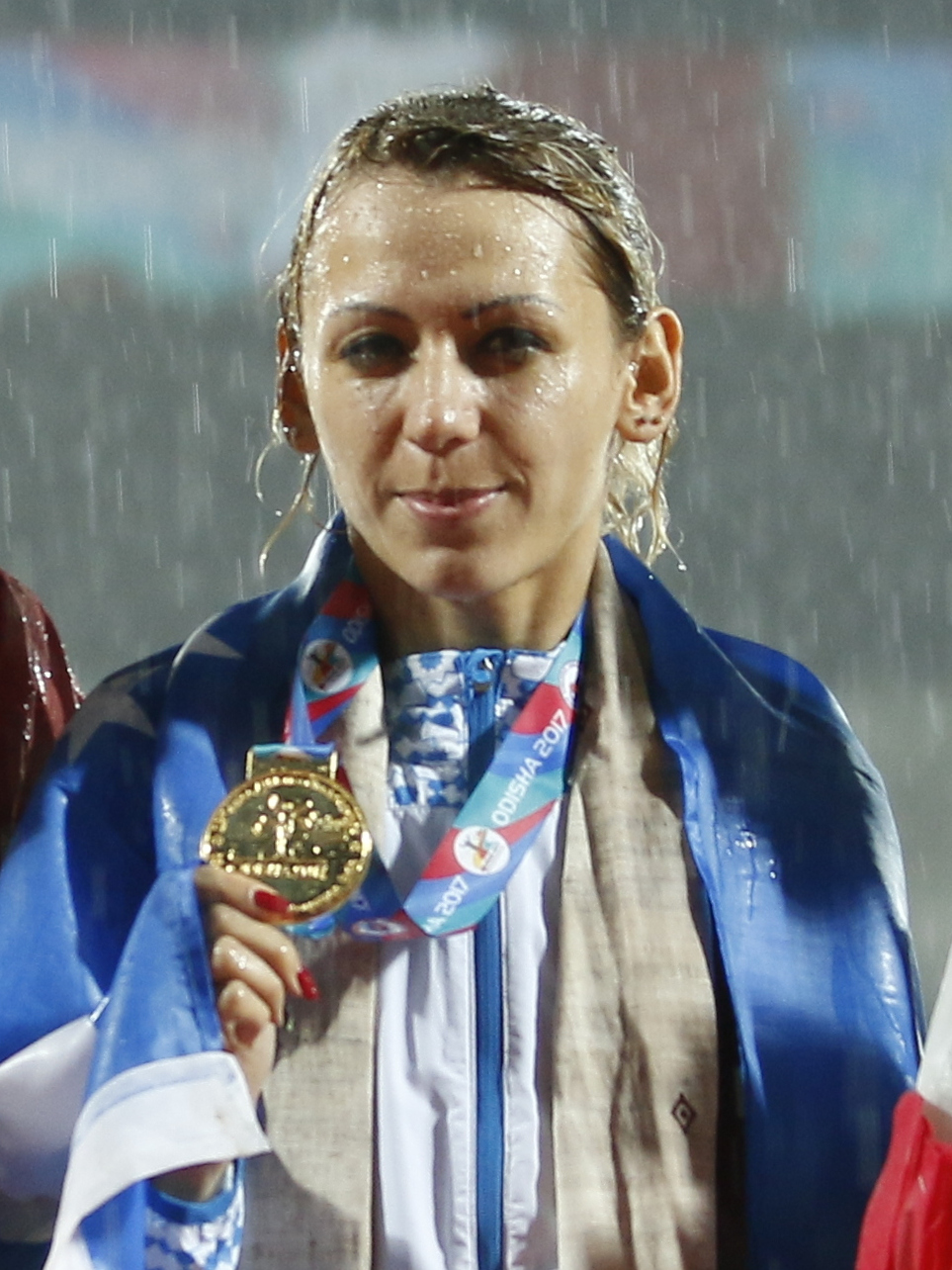
- Gold in 2017

Personal information
- Born: November 17, 1987 (age 38) Tashkent, Uzbek SSR, Soviet Union
- Height: 1.74 m (5 ft 8 1/2 in)
- Weight: 56 kg (123 lb)

Sport
- Country: Uzbekistan
- Sport: Athletics
- Event: High jump
Medal record
Women's athletics
Representing Uzbekistan
Asian Indoor Championships
Gold medal – first place	2018 Tehran	High jump
Silver medal – second place	2016 Doha	High jump

Nadiya Yusupovna Dusanova (Надия Юсуповна Дусанова; born 17 November 1987 in Tashkent, Uzbekistan) is an Uzbekistani high jumper.

She competed at the 2008, 2012 and 2016 Olympic Games without reaching the final. At the 2017 Asian Athletics Championships she won the gold medal jumping 1.84 metres. She won silver medal at 2018 Asian games with 1.94 m. which is her personal best in Asian games.

Her personal best jump is 1.98 metres, achieved in July 2008 in Tashkent. At the time, this was the Asian record.

== Career ==
She began training with Andrey Popov at the Pakhtakor Stadium (Tashkent), then continued with Valentina Lebedinskaya, Alim Akhmedzhanov, an honorable coach who has worked in Uzbekistan since 2014. Since 2006, she has successfully participated in the international arena. In that year at Asian Athletics Championships, she finished being fifth at the Asian Indoor Athletics Championships in Pattaya, Thailand, with a height of 1.78m. At the Asian Junior Athletics Championships held in Macau, she won the bronze medal in the junior category with a result of 1.84m. And at the athletics world championship in Beijing (China), the juniors took eleventh place with a result of 1.80 m.

She participated in the 2008 Summer Olympics in Beijing, China, but she failed to perform and finished 26th with a height of 1.85 m. In the same year, at the Cup of Uzbekistan in athletics, she jumped to a height of 1.98 m and repeated the Asian record.

In 2009, she won the silver medal at the Asian Championship held in Guangzhou (China) with a result of 1.90. In the same year, she won the gold medal at the Asian Indoor Games in Hanoi (Vietnam) with a result of 1.93 m. But at the World Athletics Championships held in Berlin (Germany) she took 24th place with a height of 1.89 m and failed to reach the finals. In 2010, she won the silver medal at the Asian Summer Games in Guangzhou (China) with a result of 1.93 m. At the World Indoor Athletics Championships held in Doha (Qatar), she took seventh place with 1.91 points. That year, she competed in the first IAAF Continental Cup in Split, winning a bronze medal resulting 1.88m.

At the 2012 Summer Olympics in London (Great Britain), she jumped only 1.85 m and took 20th place in qualification. In 2013, she won the title of the continental champion at the Asian Athletics Championships held in Pune (India) with a result of 1.90 m. In the same year, Nadiya Dusanova won the bronze medal of the IAAF World Challenge Series in athletics in Beijing (China).

In 2014, she won a bronze medal at the Summer Asian Games held in Incheon (Republic of Korea) with a result of 1.89 m. In 2016, she won the silver medal at the Asian Indoor Athletics Championships in Doha (Qatar) with a result of 1.88 m. At the Summer Olympics in Rio de Janeiro, Brazil that year, she finished 20th in qualifying with a 1.92.

In 2017, she won the gold medal at the Asian Athletics Championships held in Bhubaneswar (India) with a result of 1.84 m. She took the first place in the Asian Indoor Games held in Ashgabat (Turkmenistan) with a result of 1.86 m, and also took the first place in the Islamic Solidarity Games held in Baku (Azerbaijan). However, at the World Championships in Athletics in London, she finished only 21st with a height of 1.85 m and failed to reach the finals of the tournament. In the same year, she was awarded the "Golden Mongoose" international sports award for her great contribution to the development of physical education and sports.

In 2017, she won the gold medal at the Asian Athletics Championships held in Bhubaneswar (India) with a result of 1.84 m. She took the first place in the Asian Indoor Games held in Ashgabat (Turkmenistan) with a result of 1.86 m, and also took the first place in the Islamic Solidarity Games held in Baku (Azerbaijan). However, at the World Championships in Athletics in London, she finished only 21st with a height of 1.85 m and failed to reach the finals of the tournament. In the same year, she was awarded the "Golden Mongoose" international sports award for his great contribution to the development of physical education and sports.

At the 2018 Summer Asian Games in Jakarta, Indonesia, she won a silver medal with a height of 1.94 m. In the same year, she won the gold medal at the Asian Indoor Athletics Championships in Tehran (Iran) with a result of 1.87 m.

In 2019, she won the title of champion at the Asian Athletics Championships held in Doha (Qatar) with a height of 1.90 m. But at the World Athletics Championships held in Doha (Qatar), she showed only the 26th result in qualification and did not reach the finals of the tournament. She won a gold medal at the Asian Grand Prix stage held in Beijing (China) with a result of 1.89 m and also a gold medal at the stage in Chongqing (China).

== Competition record ==
Year	Competition	Venue	Position	Notes
Representing Uzbekistan
2006	Asian Indoor Championships	Pattaya, Thailand	5th	1.78 m
2006	Asian Junior Championships	Macau	3rd	1.84 m
2006	World Junior Championships	Beijing, China	11th	1.80 m
2007	Asian Championships	Amman, Jordan	6th	1.88 m
2008	Olympic Games	Beijing, China	26th (q)	1.85 m
2009	World Championships	Berlin, Germany	24th (q)	1.89 m
2009	Asian Indoor Games	Hanoi, Vietnam	1st	1.93 m
2009	Asian Championships	Guangzhou, China	2nd	1.90 m
2010	World Indoor Championships	Doha, Qatar	7th	1.91 m
2010	Asian Games	Guangzhou, China	2nd	1.93 m
2012	Olympic Games	London, United Kingdom	20th (q)	1.85 m
2013	Asian Championships	Pune, India	1st	1.90 m
2013	World Championships	Moscow, Russia	14th (q)	1.88 m
2014	World Indoor Championships	Sopot, Poland	17th (q)	1.84 m
2014	Asian Games	Incheon, South Korea	3rd	1.89 m
2016	Asian Indoor Championships	Doha, Qatar	2nd	1.88 m
2016	Olympic Games	Rio de Janeiro, Brazil	20th (q)	1.92 m
2017	Islamic Solidarity Games	Baku, Azerbaijan	1st	1.80 m
2017	Asian Championships	Bhubaneswar, India	1st	1.84 m
2017	World Championships	London, United Kingdom	21st (q)	1.85 m
2017	Asian Indoor and Martial Arts Games	Ashgabat, Turkmenistan	1st	1.86 m
2018	Asian Indoor Championships	Tehran, Iran	1st	1.87 m
2018	Asian Games	Jakarta, Indonesia	2nd	1.94 m
2019	Asian Championships	Doha, Qatar	1st	1.90 m
2019	World Championships	Doha, Qatar	26th (q)	1.80 m
