= 2002 European Athletics Indoor Championships – Women's high jump =

The women's high jump event at the 2002 European Athletics Indoor Championships was held on March 1–2.

== Medalists ==
Gold	Silver	Bronze
Marina Kuptsova; Russia	Kajsa Bergqvist; Sweden; Dóra Győrffy; Hungary	

== Results ==
=== Qualification ===
Qualification: Qualification Performance 1.94 (Q) or at least 8 best performers advanced to the final.

Rank	Athlete	Nationality	1.79	1.84	1.89	1.92	1.94	Result	Notes
1	Dóra Győrffy	Hungary	o	o	o	o	o	1.94	Q
1	Marina Kuptsova	Russia	o	o	o	o	o	1.94	Q
1	Oana Pantelimon	Romania	–	o	o	o	o	1.94	Q
4	Yelena Sivushenko	Russia	o	o	o	xo	o	1.94	Q
5	Anna Ksok	Poland	o	xxo	o	xx–	o	1.94	Q, PB
6	Kajsa Bergqvist	Sweden	o	o	xo	xo	xo	1.94	Q
7	Kathryn Holinski	Germany	o	o	o	o	xxx	1.92	q
7	Susan Jones	Great Britain	o	o	o	o	xxx	1.92	q
9	Iryna Mykhalchenko	Ukraine	o	xo	o	o	xxx	1.92	
10	Blanka Vlašić	Croatia	o	o	xxo	o	xxx	1.92	
11	Viktoriya Seryogina	Russia	o	o	o	xxo	xxx	1.92	
12	Mária Melová	Slovakia	o	xo	o	xxx		1.89	
12	Venelina Veneva	Bulgaria	o	xo	o	xxx		1.89	
14	Ina Gliznutsa	Moldova	o	xxo	o	xxx		1.89	
15	Ruth Beitia	Spain	o	xo	xxo	xxx		1.89	
16	Elena Herzenberg	Germany	o	o	xxx			1.84	
16	Marta Mendía	Spain	o	o	xxx			1.84	
16	Renáta Medgyesová	Slovakia	o	o	xxx			1.84	
16	Ramona Pop	Romania	o	o	xxx			1.84	
20	Barbora Lalakova	Czech Republic	o	xo	xxx			1.84	
20	Candeger Kilincer	Turkey	o	xo	xxx			1.84	
22	Deirdre Ryan	Ireland	xo	xxo	xxx			1.84	
23	Diana Láznicková	Slovakia	o	xxx				1.79	
24	Agni Charalambous	Cyprus	xo	xxx				1.79	
24	Marianne Mattas	Finland	xo	xxx				1.79	
26	Nevena Lenđel	Croatia	xxo	xxx				1.79	

=== Final ===
Rank	Athlete	Nationality	1.85	1.90	1.93	1.95	1.97	1.99	2.01	2.03	Result	Notes
1st place, gold medalist(s)	Marina Kuptsova	Russia	o	o	o	o	o	o	o	xo	2.03	=NR
2nd place, silver medalist(s)	Kajsa Bergqvist	Sweden	o	o	o	o	x–	–	xx		1.95	
2nd place, silver medalist(s)	Dóra Győrffy	Hungary	o	o	o	o	x–	x–	x		1.95	
4	Kathryn Holinski	Germany	o	o	xo	xxx					1.93	
5	Susan Jones	Great Britain	o	o	xxx						1.90	
5	Anna Ksok	Poland	o	o	xx–	x					1.90	
5	Yelena Sivushenko	Russia	o	o	xxx						1.90	
8	Oana Pantelimon	Romania	o	xo	xxx						1.90	
