= Athletics at the 1999 Summer Universiade – Women's high jump =

The women's high jump event at the 1999 Summer Universiade was held on 8 and 9 July at the Estadio Son Moix in Palma de Mallorca, Spain.

== Medalists ==
Gold	Silver	Bronze
Monica Dinescu-Iagăr; Romania	Svetlana Lapina; Russia	Solange Witteveen; Argentina

== Results ==
=== Qualification ===
Qualification: 1.93 (Q) or at least 12 best performers (q) advance to the final

Rank	Group	Athlete	Nationality	1.70	1.75	1.80	1.85	1.88	Result	Notes
1	A	Dóra Győrffy	Hungary						1.88	q
2	A	Iryna Mykhalchenko	Ukraine						1.88	q
3	A	Nevena Lenđel	Croatia						1.85	q
3	A	Yekaterina Aleksandrova	Russia						1.85	q
3	A	Marta Mendía	Spain	o	o	o	o	xxx	1.85	q
6	A	Lee McConnell	Great Britain						1.80	
6	A	Agnieszka Giedrojć-Juraha	Poland						1.80	
8	A	Tatyana Efimenko	Kyrgyzstan						1.80	
8	A	Lisa Bruty	Australia						1.80	
10	A	Luciane Dambacher	Brazil						1.80	
11	A	Adriane Sims	United States						1.75	
12	A	Analía Santos	Argentina						1.75	
1	B	Svetlana Lapina	Russia						1.88	q
2	B	Kärt Siilats	Estonia						1.88	q
3	B	Solange Witteveen	Argentina						1.88	q
4	B	Monica Dinescu-Iagăr	Romania						1.88	q
5	B	Susan Jones	Great Britain						1.88	q
6	B	Inna Gliznuta	Moldova						1.88	q
7	B	Erin Aldrich	United States						1.85	q
7	B	Francesca Bradamante	Italy						1.85	q
9	B	Tia Hellebaut	Belgium						1.80	
10	B	Romana Bělocká	Czech Republic						1.80	
	B	Nicole Forrester	Canada						NM	
	B	Kajsa Bergquist	Sweden						DNS	

=== Final ===
Rank	Athlete	Nationality	1.80	1.85	1.88	1.91	1.93	1.95	1.97	Result	Notes
1st place, gold medalist(s)	Monica Dinescu-Iagăr	Romania	o	o	o	o	xo	xxo	xx	1.95	
2nd place, silver medalist(s)	Svetlana Lapina	Russia								1.93	
3rd place, bronze medalist(s)	Solange Witteveen	Argentina								1.93	
4	Dóra Győrffy	Hungary								1.91	
5	Yekaterina Aleksandrova	Russia								1.88	
6	Iryna Mykhalchenko	Ukraine								1.88	
6	Marta Mendía	Spain	o	o	xxo	xxx				1.88	
8	Kärt Siilats	Estonia								1.88	
9	Inna Gliznuta	Moldova								1.85	
10	Susan Jones	Great Britain								1.85	
11	Erin Aldrich	United States								1.85	
12	Francesca Bradamante	Italy								1.80	
13	Nevena Lenđel	Croatia								1.80	
