= 1998 European Athletics Championships – Women's high jump =

Women's high jump at the European Athletics Championships

The women's high jump at the 1998 European Athletics Championships was held at the Népstadion on 20 and 23 August.

== Medalists ==
| Gold | Monica Dinescu; Romania |
| Silver | Donata Jancewicz; Poland |
| Bronze | Alina Astafei; Germany |

== Results ==
| KEY: | q | Better non-qualifiers | Q | Qualified | NR | National record | PB | Personal best | SB | Seasonal best |

=== Qualification ===
Qualification: Qualification Performance 1.93 (Q) or at least 12 best performers advance to the final.

| Rank | Group | Athlete | Nationality | Result | Notes |
|---|---|---|---|---|---|
| 1 | A | Vita Styopina | Ukraine | 1.93 | Q |
| 1 | A | Yelena Gulyayeva | Russia | 1.93 | Q |
| 1 | A | Viktoriya Fyodorova | Russia | 1.93 | Q |
| 1 | A | Donata Jancewicz | Poland | 1.93 | Q, SB |
| 1 | B | Sigrid Kirchmann | Austria | 1.93 | Q |
| 1 | B | Monica Dinescu | Romania | 1.93 | Q |
| 1 | B | Yuliya Lyakhova | Russia | 1.93 | Q |
| 8 | A | Venelina Veneva | Bulgaria | 1.90 | q |
| 8 | A | Alina Astafei | Germany | 1.90 | q |
| 8 | A | Pia Zinck | Denmark | 1.90 | q |
| 8 | B | Zuzana Kováčiková | Czech Republic | 1.90 | q |
| 8 | B | Niki Bakoyianni | Greece | 1.90 | q |
| 13 | A | Kajsa Bergqvist | Sweden | 1.90 | |
| 13 | A | Tatsiana Sheuchyk | Belarus | 1.90 | |
| 13 | B | Iryna Mykhalchenko | Ukraine | 1.90 | |
| 16 | A | Olga Bolşova | Moldova | 1.87 | |
| 16 | A | Dóra Győrffy | Hungary | 1.87 | |
| 16 | A | Monika Gollner | Austria | 1.87 | |
| 16 | B | Khristina Kalcheva | Bulgaria | 1.87 | |
| 16 | B | Nelė Žilinskienė | Lithuania | 1.87 | |
| 21 | B | Francesca Bradamante | Italy | 1.83 | |
| 21 | B | Daniela Rath | Germany | 1.83 | |
| 21 | B | Çigdem Arslan | Turkey | 1.83 | |
| 21 | B | Inna Gliznuta | Moldova | 1.83 | |
| 21 | B | Tatyana Gulevich | Belarus | 1.83 | |
| 26 | B | Mimi Storm-Hansen | Norway | 1.78 | |

=== Final ===
| Rank | Athlete | Nationality | 1.80 | 1.85 | 1.89 | 1.92 | 1.95 | 1.97 | 2.03 | Result | Notes |
|---|---|---|---|---|---|---|---|---|---|---|---|
| 1st place, gold medalist(s) | Monica Dinescu | Romania | o | o | o | o | o | xo | xxx | 1.97 | |
| 2nd place, silver medalist(s) | Donata Jancewicz | Poland | – | o | – | xo | o | xxx | | 1.95 | PB |
| 3rd place, bronze medalist(s) | Alina Astafei | Germany | o | o | o | xxo | o | xxx | | 1.95 | |
| 4 | Sigrid Kirchmann | Austria | – | o | xxo | o | xxx | | | 1.92 | |
| 5 | Venelina Veneva | Bulgaria | – | o | – | xo | xxx | | | 1.92 | |
| 6 | Yelena Gulyayeva | Russia | o | o | xxo | xo | xxx | | | 1.92 | |
| 7 | Vita Styopina | Ukraine | o | xo | o | xxo | xxx | | | 1.92 | |
| 8 | Pia Zinck | Denmark | o | o | o | xxx | | | | 1.89 | |
| 9 | Niki Bakoyianni | Greece | o | o | xxo | xxx | | | | 1.89 | |
| 10 | Viktoriya Fyodorova | Russia | o | o | xxx | | | | | 1.85 | |
| 11 | Zuzana Kováčiková | Czech Republic | xo | o | xxx | | | | | 1.85 | |
| 12 | Yuliya Lyakhova | Russia | xo | xo | xxx | | | | | 1.85 | |
