= 2005 European Athletics Indoor Championships – Women's high jump =

The Women's high jump event at the 2005 European Athletics Indoor Championships was held on March 4–5.

== Medalists ==
Gold	Silver	Bronze
Anna Chicherova; Russia	Ruth Beitia; Spain	Venelina Veneva; Bulgaria

== Results ==
=== Qualification ===
Qualification: Qualification Performance 1.95 (Q) or at least 8 best performers advanced to the final.

Rank	Athlete	Nationality	1.78	1.83	1.88	1.92	Result	Notes
1	Yekaterina Aleksandrova	Russia	o	o	o	o	1.92	q
1	Anna Chicherova	Russia	o	o	o	o	1.92	q
1	Tatyana Kivimyagi	Russia	o	o	o	o	1.92	q
1	Marta Mendía	Spain	o	o	o	o	1.92	q, =SB
1	Oana Pantelimon	Romania	–	o	o	o	1.92	q
1	Venelina Veneva	Bulgaria	o	o	o	o	1.92	q
7	Ruth Beitia	Spain	o	o	o	xo	1.92	q
8	Emma Green	Sweden	o	o	o	xxo	1.92	q, PB
9	Iva Straková	Czech Republic	o	o	xxo	xxo	1.92	q
10	Monica Iagăr	Romania	o	o	o	xxx	1.88	
11	Iryna Kovalenko	Ukraine	o	o	xo	xxx	1.88	
11	Corinne Müller	Switzerland	o	o	xo	xxx	1.88	
13	Susan Jones	Great Britain	o	o	xxo	xxx	1.88	
14	Julie Crane	Great Britain	o	o	xxx		1.83	
14	Deirdre Ryan	Ireland	o	o	xxx		1.83	
14	Anna Visigalli	Italy	o	o	xxx		1.83	
17	Maria Papageorgiou	Greece	o	xxo	xxx		1.83	
18	Diana Láznicková	Slovakia	xo	xxo	xxx		1.83	

=== Final ===
Rank	Athlete	Nationality	1.80	1.85	1.89	1.92	1.95	1.97	1.99	2.01	Result	Notes
1st place, gold medalist(s)	Anna Chicherova	Russia	o	o	o	o	o	o	xo	xxo	2.01	WL
2nd place, silver medalist(s)	Ruth Beitia	Spain	o	o	o	o	o	o	o	xxx	1.99	SB
3rd place, bronze medalist(s)	Venelina Veneva	Bulgaria	–	o	o	xo	o	xo	xxx		1.97	SB
4	Marta Mendía	Spain	o	o	o	o	xo	xxx			1.95	SB
5	Tatyana Kivimyagi	Russia	o	o	o	o	xxx				1.92	
6	Yekaterina Aleksandrova	Russia	o	o	o	xo	xxx				1.92	
7	Iva Straková	Czech Republic	o	xxo	o	xxx					1.89	
8	Emma Green	Sweden	o	o	xo	xxx					1.89	
9	Oana Pantelimon	Romania	o	o	xxx						1.85	
