= 2002 European Athletics Championships – Women's high jump =

Women's high jump at the European Athletics Championships

The women's high jump at the 2002 European Athletics Championships were held at the Olympic Stadium on August 9–11.

== Medalists ==
Gold	Silver	Bronze
Kajsa Bergqvist; Sweden	Marina Kuptsova; Russia	Olga Kaliturina; Russia

== Results ==
=== Qualification ===
Qualification: Qualifying Performance 1.92 (Q) or at least 12 best performers (q) advance to the final.

==== Group A ====
Rank	Name	Nationality	1.78	1.83	1.87	1.90	Result	Notes
1	Kajsa Bergqvist	Sweden	o	o	o	o	1.90	q
1	Irina Mikhalchenko	Ukraine	o	o	o	o	1.90	q
1	Viktoriya Seryogina	Russia	o	o	o	o	1.90	q
4	Kathryn Holinski	Germany					1.90	q
4	Anna Ksok	Poland					1.90	q
6	Dóra Győrffy	Hungary					1.90	q
7	Blanka Vlašić	Croatia					1.90	q
7	Olga Kaliturina	Russia					1.90	q
9	Marta Mendía	Spain	o	o	xo	xxx	1.87	
10	Iva Straková	Czech Republic					1.87	
11	Lucie Finez	France					1.78	

==== Group B ====
Rank	Name	Nationality	1.78	1.83	1.87	1.90	Result	Notes
1	Ruth Beitia	Spain	o	o	o	o	1.90	q
2	Susan Jones	Great Britain					1.90	q
2	Oana Pantelimon	Romania					1.90	q
4	Marina Kuptsova	Russia					1.90	q
5	Nevena Lenđel	Croatia					1.87	
6	Elena Herzenberg	Germany					1.87	
7	Inna Gliznuta	Moldova					1.87	
8	Mária Melová	Slovakia					1.83	
9	Barbora Laláková	Czech Republic					1.83	
10	Candeğer Kılınçer	Turkey					1.78	

=== Final ===
Rank	Name	Nationality	1.80	1.85	1.89	1.92	1.94	1.96	1.98	2.00	Result	Notes
1st place, gold medalist(s)	Kajsa Bergqvist	Sweden	–	o	o	o	o	o	xxo	x–	1.98	
2nd place, silver medalist(s)	Marina Kuptsova	Russia	o	o	o	xxo	–	–	xx–	x	1.92	
3rd place, bronze medalist(s)	Olga Kaliturina	Russia	o	o	o	xxx					1.89	
4	Oana Pantelimon	Romania	o	xo	o	xxx					1.89	
5	Anna Ksok	Poland	o	o	xo	xxx					1.89	
5	Blanka Vlašić	Croatia	o	o	xo	xxx					1.89	
7	Susan Jones	Great Britain	o	o	xxo	xxx					1.89	
7	Kathryn Holinski	Germany	o	o	xxo	xxx					1.89	
9	Irina Mikhalchenko	Ukraine	xo	o	xxo	xxx					1.89	
10	Viktoriya Seryogina	Russia	o	xo	xxx						1.85	
11	Ruth Beitia	Spain	o	xxo	xxx						1.85	
12	Dóra Győrffy	Hungary	xo	xxx							1.80	
