= 2005 World Championships in Athletics – Women's high jump =

The Women's High Jump event at the 2005 World Championships in Athletics was held at the Helsinki Olympic Stadium on August 6 and August 8.

== Medalists ==
Gold	Kajsa Bergqvist; Sweden (SWE)
Silver	Chaunte Howard; United States (USA)
Bronze	Emma Green; Sweden (SWE)

== Records ==
World Record	Stefka Kostadinova (BUL)	2.09 m	Rome, Italy	30 August 1987
Championship Record	Stefka Kostadinova (BUL)	2.09 m	Rome, Italy	30 August 1987

== Results ==
=== Qualification ===
Qualification: 1.93 m (Q) or best 12 performances (q)

Rank	Group	Name	Nationality	1.80	1.84	1.88	1.91	1.93	Result	Notes
1	B	Vita Palamar	Ukraine	–	o	o	o	o	1.93	Q
1	B	Tia Hellebaut	Belgium	o	o	o	xo	o	1.93	Q, SB
3	A	Anna Chicherova	Russia	o	o	o	xxo	o	1.93	Q
4	A	Chaunte Howard	United States	o	xo	xo	xo	xo	1.93	Q
4	A	Iryna Mykhalchenko	Ukraine	o	xo	xo	xxo	xo	1.93	Q
6	A	Emma Green	Sweden	–	o	o	o	–	1.91	q
6	A	Iva Straková	Czech Republic	o	o	o	o	xxx	1.91	q
6	A	Viktoriya Styopina	Ukraine	o	o	o	o	xxx	1.91	q
6	B	Dóra Győrffy	Hungary	o	o	o	o	–	1.91	q
6	B	Kajsa Bergqvist	Sweden	–	o	o	o	–	1.91	q
11	B	Venelina Veneva	Bulgaria	o	o	o	xo	xxx	1.91	q
11	B	Amy Acuff	United States	o	xo	o	xo	xxx	1.91	q
13	B	Oana Pantelimon	Romania	o	o	o	xxo	xxx	1.91	
14	A	Corinne Müller	Switzerland	o	o	xo	xxo	xxx	1.91	
15	A	Melanie Skotnik	France	o	o	o	xxx		1.88	
15	A	Marta Mendía	Spain	o	o	o	xxx		1.88	
17	B	Erin Aldrich	United States	o	xo	o	xxx		1.88	
18	B	Tatyana Kivimyagi	Russia	o	o	xo	xxx		1.88	
19	B	Ruth Beitia	Spain	o	o	xxo	xxx		1.88	
19	B	Blanka Vlašić	Croatia	o	o	xxo	xxx		1.88	
21	A	Inna Gliznutsa	Moldova	o	o	xxx			1.84	
22	B	Levern Spencer	Saint Lucia	xo	o	xxx			1.84	
23	A	Caterine Ibargüen	Colombia	o	xo	xxx			1.84	
23	B	Romary Rifka	Mexico	o	xo	xxx			1.84	SB
25	B	Zheng Xingjuan	China	xo	xo	xxx			1.84	
26	A	Monica Iagăr	Romania	o	xxo	xxx			1.84	
27	A	Hanna Mikkonen	Finland	o	xxx				1.80	
28	B	Juana Arrendel	Dominican Republic	o	xxx				1.80	
	A	Tatiana Efimenko	Kyrgyzstan	x					NM	
	A	Yelena Slesarenko	Russia						DNS	

=== Final ===
Rank	Name	Nationality	1.80	1.85	1.89	1.93	1.96	1.98	2.00	2.02	2.10	Result	Notes
1st place, gold medalist(s)	Kajsa Bergqvist	Sweden	—	o	o	o	o	o	xo	o	xxx	2.02	WL
2nd place, silver medalist(s)	Chaunte Howard	United States	o	o	o	o	xo	xo	xxo	xxx		2.00	=PB
3rd place, bronze medalist(s)	Emma Green	Sweden	o	o	o	xo	xo	xxx				1.96	PB
4	Anna Chicherova	Russia	o	o	o	o	xxo	xxx				1.96	
5	Vita Palamar	Ukraine	—	o	o	o	xxx					1.93	
6	Tia Hellebaut	Belgium	o	o	xxo	o	xxx					1.93	SB
7	Vita Styopina	Ukraine	o	o	o	xxo	xxx					1.93	SB
8	Amy Acuff	United States	o	xo	o	xxx						1.89	
9	Dóra Győrffy	Hungary	o	o	xxo	xxx						1.89	
10	Venelina Veneva-Mateeva	Bulgaria	o	o	xxx							1.85	
11	Iva Strakova	Czech Republic	xo	o	xxx							1.85	
12	Iryna Mykhalchenko	Ukraine	o	xo	xxx							1.85	
