= Athletics at the 2001 Summer Universiade – Women's high jump =

The women's high jump event at the 2001 Summer Universiade was held at the Workers Stadium in Beijing, China on 29 and 31 August.

== Medalists ==
Gold	Silver	Bronze
Vita Palamar; Ukraine	Nicole Forrester; Canada	Nevena Lenđel; Croatia

== Results ==
=== Qualification ===
Rank	Group	Athlete	Nationality	Result	Notes
1	A	Nicole Forrester	Canada	1.88	q
1	A	Inna Gliznuta	Moldova	1.88	q
3	A	Anna Chicherova	Russia	1.88	q
4	A	Erin Aldrich	United States	1.88	q
5	A	Michelle Dunkley	Great Britain	1.85	
6	A	Nicolize Steyn	South Africa	1.80	
7	A	Luciane Dambacher	Brazil	1.80	
8	A	Deirdre Ryan	Ireland	1.80	
9	A	Marina Aitova	Kazakhstan	1.80	
1	B	Vita Palamar	Ukraine	1.88	q
2	B	Candeğer Kılınçer	Turkey	1.88	q
3	B	Susan Jones	Great Britain	1.88	q
4	B	Marizca Gertenbach	South Africa	1.85	q
4	B	Marina Kuptsova	Russia	1.85	q
6	B	Carri Long	United States	1.85	q
7	B	Antonietta Di Martino	Italy	1.85	q
7	B	Nevena Lenđel	Croatia	1.85	q
9	B	Corinne Müller	Switzerland	1.85	
10	B	Lu Jieming	China	1.80	
11	B	Kärt Siilats	Estonia	1.80	

=== Final ===
Rank	Athlete	Nationality	Result	Notes
1st place, gold medalist(s)	Vita Palamar	Ukraine	1.96	
2nd place, silver medalist(s)	Nicole Forrester	Canada	1.94	
3rd place, bronze medalist(s)	Nevena Lenđel	Croatia	1.91	
4	Erin Aldrich	United States	1.88	
4	Susan Jones	Great Britain	1.88	
4	Inna Gliznuta	Moldova	1.88	
7	Marina Kuptsova	Russia	1.88	
8	Anna Chicherova	Russia	1.85	
8	Candeğer Kılınçer	Turkey	1.85	
10	Marizca Gertenbach	South Africa	1.85	
11	Carri Long	United States	1.80	
	Antonietta Di Martino	Italy	NM	
