= Athletics at the 1997 Summer Universiade – Women's high jump =

The women's high jump event at the 1997 Summer Universiade was held on 29 and 31 August at the Stadio Cibali in Catania, Italy.

== Medalists ==
Gold	Silver	Bronze
Amy Acuff; United States	Monica Iagăr; Romania	Marie Collonvillé; France

== Results ==
=== Qualification ===
Rank	Group	Athlete	Nationality	Result	Notes
?	?	Amy Acuff	United States	1.88	
?	?	Francesca Bradamante	Italy	1.88	
?	?	Marie Collonvillé	France	1.88	
?	?	Dóra Győrffy	Hungary	1.88	
?	?	Monica Iagăr	Romania	1.88	
?	?	Miki Imai	Japan	1.88	
?	?	Karol Jenkins	United States	1.88	
?	?	Susan Jones	Great Britain	1.88	
?	?	Zuzana Kováčiková	Czech Republic	1.88	
?	?	Yoko Ota	Japan	1.88	
?	?	Vita Styopina	Ukraine	1.88	
?	?	Solange Witteveen	Argentina	1.88	
?	?	Corinne Müller	Switzerland	1.85	
?	?	Iryna Mykhalchenko	Ukraine	1.85	
?	?	Thaís de Andrade	Brazil	1.80	
?	?	Liina Põldots	Estonia	1.80	
?	?	Kim Mi-ok	South Korea	1.80	
?	?	Sherryl Morrow	Australia	1.75	
?	?	Nicole Forrester	Canada	1.75	
?	?	Marieke van der Heijden	Netherlands	1.75	
?	?	Linda Horvath	Austria	1.75	
?	?	Marloes Strooper-Lammerts	Netherlands	1.75	
?	?	Sherryl Purcell	Australia	1.75	
?	?	Viktoriya Fedorova	Russia	DNS	

=== Final ===
Rank	Athlete	Nationality	Result	Notes
1st place, gold medalist(s)	Amy Acuff	United States	1.98	
2nd place, silver medalist(s)	Monica Iagăr	Romania	1.96	
3rd place, bronze medalist(s)	Marie Collonvillé	France	1.94	
4	Vita Styopina	Ukraine	1.91	
5	Karol Jenkins	United States	1.91	
6	Zuzana Kováčiková	Czech Republic	1.91	
6	Susan Jones	Great Britain	1.91	
6	Solange Witteveen	Argentina	1.91	
9	Francesca Bradamante	Italy	1.91	
10	Dóra Győrffy	Hungary	1.88	
11	Miki Imai	Japan	1.80	
12	Yoko Ota	Japan	1.80	
