= 2003 World Championships in Athletics – Women's high jump =

These are the official results of the Women's High Jump event at the 2003 World Championships in Paris, France. There was a total of 25 participating athletes, with the final being held on Sunday, 31 August 2003.

== Medalists ==
Gold	Hestrie Cloete; South Africa (RSA)
Silver	Marina Kuptsova; Russia (RUS)
Bronze	Kajsa Bergqvist; Sweden (SWE)

== Schedule ==
- All times are Central European Time (UTC+1)

Qualification Round
Group A	Group B
29.08.2003 – 18:45h	29.08.2003 – 18:45h
Final Round
31.08.2003 – 16:45h

== Abbreviations ==
- All results shown are in metres

Q	automatic qualification
q	qualification by rank
DNS	did not start
NM	no mark
WR	world record
AR	area record
NR	national record
PB	personal best
SB	season best

== Results ==
=== Qualification ===
Qualification: 1.93 m (Q) or best 12 performances (q)

Rank	Group	Name	Nationality	1.80	1.85	1.88	1.91	1.93	Result	Notes
1	A	Hestrie Cloete	South Africa	–	o	o	o	o	1.93	Q
1	A	Vita Palamar	Ukraine	–	o	o	o	o	1.93	Q
1	A	Vita Styopina	Ukraine	o	o	o	o	o	1.93	Q
1	B	Kajsa Bergqvist	Sweden	–	o	o	o	o	1.93	Q
5	B	Ruth Beitia	Spain	xo	o	o	o	o	1.93	Q
6	B	Blanka Vlašić	Croatia	–	o	–	xxo	o	1.93	Q
7	A	Amy Acuff	United States	o	o	o	o	xo	1.93	Q
7	A	Juana Arrendel	Dominican Republic	o	o	o	o	xo	1.93	Q
7	A	Marina Kuptsova	Russia	o	o	o	o	xo	1.93	Q
10	A	Venelina Veneva	Bulgaria	xo	o	o	o	xo	1.93	Q
11	B	Olga Kaliturina	Russia	o	o	o	o	xxx	1.91	q
12	B	Anna Chicherova	Russia	xo	o	xo	o	xxx	1.91	q
13	A	Marta Mendía	Spain	o	o	xo	xxo	xxx	1.91	
14	B	Oana Pantelimon	Romania	o	o	o	xxx		1.88	
15	B	Inha Babakova	Ukraine	o	o	xxo	xxx		1.88	
16	B	Daniela Rath	Germany	–	xo	xxo	xxx		1.88	
17	B	Antonella Bevilacqua	Italy	o	o	xxx			1.85	
18	A	Gaëlle Niaré	France	o	xo	xxx			1.85	
18	B	Solange Witteveen	Argentina	o	xo	xxx			1.85	
20	A	Anne Gerd Eieland	Norway	o	xxo	xxx			1.85	
21	B	Romary Rifka	Mexico	o	xxx				1.80	
22	A	Iva Straková	Czech Republic	xo	xxx				1.80	
22	B	Marina Aitova	Kazakhstan	xo	xxx				1.80	
	A	Miki Imai	Japan	xxx					NM	
	B	Gwen Wentland	United States						DNS	

=== Final ===
Rank	Name	Nationality	1.85	1.90	1.95	1.98	2.00	2.02	2.04	2.06	2.10	Result	Notes
1st place, gold medalist(s)	Hestrie Cloete	South Africa	o	o	o	o	o	o	o	o	xxx	2.06	WL, AR
2nd place, silver medalist(s)	Marina Kuptsova	Russia	o	o	xo	o	o	x–	x–	x		2.00	
3rd place, bronze medalist(s)	Kajsa Bergqvist	Sweden	o	o	o	xxo	xo	x–	xx			2.00	
4	Venelina Veneva	Bulgaria	o	o	o	xo	xxx					1.98	SB
5	Vita Palamar	Ukraine	o	o	o	xxx						1.95	
6	Anna Chicherova	Russia	o	xo	o	xxx						1.95	
7	Blanka Vlašić	Croatia	–	o	xo	xxx						1.95	
8	Juana Arrendel	Dominican Republic	o	xo	xo	xxx						1.95	SB
9	Amy Acuff	United States	o	o	xxx							1.90	
9	Vita Styopina	Ukraine	o	o	xxx							1.90	
11	Olga Kaliturina	Russia	o	xo	xxx							1.90	
11	Ruth Beitia	Spain	o	xo	xxx							1.90	

== See also ==
- 2003 High Jump Year Ranking
- Athletics at the 2003 Pan American Games – Women's high jump
