= 2001 World Championships in Athletics – Women's high jump =

These are the results of the Women's High Jump event at the 2001 World Championships in Athletics in Edmonton, Alberta, Canada.

== Medalists ==
Gold	Hestrie Cloete; South Africa (RSA)
Silver	Inha Babakova; Ukraine (UKR)
Bronze	Kajsa Bergqvist; Sweden (SWE)

== Schedule ==
- All times are Mountain Standard Time (UTC-7)

Qualification Round
Group A	Group B
10.08.2001 – 19:30	10.08.2001 – 19:30
Final Round
12.08.2001 – 14:30

== Results ==
=== Qualification ===
5 August

Qualification standard: 1.93 m or at least 12 best.

Rank	Group	Name	1.80	1.85	1.88	1.91	Result	Notes
1	A	Vita Palamar (UKR)	o	o	o	o	1.91	q
1	A	Hestrie Cloete (RSA)	o	o	o	o	1.91	q
1	B	Amy Acuff (USA)	o	o	o	o	1.91	q
1	B	Inha Babakova (UKR)	o	o	o	o	1.91	q
5	A	Venelina Veneva (BUL)	o	o	xo	o	1.91	q
5	B	Antonietta Di Martino (ITA)	o	xo	o	o	1.91	q
7	A	Yelena Gulyayeva (RUS)	o	o	o	xo	1.91	q
7	A	Monica Iagăr-Dinescu (ROM)	o	o	o	xo	1.91	q
9	A	Kajsa Bergqvist (SWE)	o	o	xo	xo	1.91	q
10	B	Oana Musunoiu-Pantelimon (ROM)	xo	o	o	xxo	1.91	q
11	B	Dóra Győrffy (HUN)	o	o	o	xxx	1.88	q
12	B	Blanka Vlašić (CRO)	o	xo	o	xxx	1.88	q
13	B	Susan Jones (GBR)	o	o	xo	xxx	1.88	
13	B	Yelena Yelesina (RUS)	o	o	xo	xxx	1.88	
14	B	Wanita May (CAN)	o	xo	xo	xxx	1.88	
15	A	Nele Zilinskiene (LTU)	o	o	xxo	xxx	1.88	
15	B	Yekaterina Aleksandrova (RUS)	o	o	xxo	xxx	1.88	
17	B	Juana Rosario Arrendel (DOM)	o	xxo	xxo	xxx	1.88	
18	A	Miki Imai (JPN)	o	o	xxx		1.85	
19	B	Svetlana Zalevskaya (KAZ)	xo	o	xxx		1.85	
20	B	Marta Mendia (ESP)	o	xxo	xxx		1.85	
21	A	Līga Kļaviņa (LAT)	xo	xxx			1.80	
	A	Erin Aldrich (USA)	xxx				NM	

=== Final ===
12 August

Rank	Name	1.85	1.90	1.94	1.97	2.00	2.02	Result	Notes
Gold medal	Hestrie Cloete (RSA)	o	o	o	o	xo	xxx	2.00	SB
Silver medal	Inha Babakova (UKR)	o	xo	o	xo	xo	xxx	2.00	
Bronze medal	Kajsa Bergqvist (SWE)	o	o	o	o	xxx		1.97	
4	Venelina Veneva (BUL)	xo	o	xxo	xo	xxx		1.97	
5	Vita Palamar (UKR)	o	xo	o	xxx			1.94	
6	Blanka Vlašić (CRO)	xxo	xo	o	xxx			1.94	
7	Monica Iagăr-Dinescu (ROM)	o	o	xxx				1.90	
7	Dóra Győrffy (HUN)	o	o	xxx				1.90	
9	Oana Musunoiu-Pantelimon (ROM)	xxo	o	xxx				1.90	
10	Amy Acuff (USA)	o	xo	xxx				1.90	
10	Yelena Gulyayeva (RUS)	o	xo	xxx				1.90	
12	Antonietta Di Martino (ITA)	xo	xxx					1.85	
