= 2003 IAAF World Indoor Championships – Women's high jump =

The women's high jump event at the 2003 IAAF World Indoor Championships was held on March 15–16.

== Medalists ==
Gold	Silver	Bronze
Kajsa Bergqvist; Sweden	Yelena Yelesina; Russia	Anna Chicherova; Russia

== Results ==
=== Qualification ===
Qualification: Qualification Performance 1.95 (Q) or at least 8 best performers advanced to the final.

Rank	Group	Athlete	Nationality	1.87	1.90	1.93	1.95	Result	Notes
1	A	Inha Babakova	Ukraine	o	xo	o	o	1.95	Q, SB
1	B	Yelena Yelesina	Russia	o	xo	o	o	1.95	Q
1	B	Tisha Waller	United States	o	o	xo	o	1.95	Q
1	B	Iryna Mykhalchenko	Ukraine	o	o	xo	o	1.95	Q
5	A	Oana Pantelimon	Romania	xo	xo	xxo	o	1.95	Q, PB
6	B	Ruth Beitia	Spain	o	o	o	xo	1.95	Q
7	B	Blanka Vlašić	Croatia	o	xo	o	xo	1.95	Q
8	B	Anna Chicherova	Russia	o	xo	xo	xo	1.95	Q
9	B	Kajsa Bergqvist	Sweden	o	o	o	xxo	1.95	Q
10	A	Amy Acuff	United States	o	xo	xo	xxo	1.95	Q, SB
11	A	Susan Moncrieff	Great Britain	xo	xo	xxo	xxx	1.93	PB
12	A	Tatyana Efimenko	Kyrgyzstan	o	o	xxx		1.90	
13	B	Dóra Győrffy	Hungary	xo	o	xxx		1.90	
13	B	Iva Straková	Czech Republic	xo	o	xxx		1.90	
15	A	Anna Ksok	Poland	xx–	o	xx–	x	1.90	
16	A	Elena Herzenberg	Germany	o	xo	xxx		1.90	
17	A	Marina Aitova	Kazakhstan	xxo	xxx			1.87	PB
	A	Yoko Hunnicutt	Japan	xxx				NM	

=== Final ===
Rank	Athlete	Nationality	1.88	1.92	1.96	1.99	2.01	Result	Notes
1st place, gold medalist(s)	Kajsa Bergqvist	Sweden	o	o	o	o	o	2.01	
2nd place, silver medalist(s)	Yelena Yelesina	Russia	o	xxo	o	xo	xxx	1.99	
3rd place, bronze medalist(s)	Anna Chicherova	Russia	o	xo	xxo	xo	xxx	1.99	
4	Blanka Vlašić	Croatia	o	o	o	xx–	x	1.96	
5	Iryna Mykhalchenko	Ukraine	o	xo	o	xxx		1.96	
5	Ruth Beitia	Spain	o	xo	o	xxx		1.96	NR
7	Tisha Waller	United States	o	o	xxo	xxx		1.96	
8	Inha Babakova	Ukraine	o	o	xxx			1.92	
9	Oana Pantelimon	Romania	xo	o	xxx			1.92	
10	Amy Acuff	United States	o	xxo	xxx			1.92	
