= 2002 European Cup (athletics) =

- Dates: 22–23 June
- Host city: Annecy, France
- Level: Senior
- Type: Outdoor
- Events: 40

The 2002 European Cup was the 23rd edition of the European Cup of athletics.

The Super League Finals were held in Annecy, France.

It was the first edition to feature women's 3000 metres steeplechase equalising the number of events for men and women.

== Super League ==
Held on 22 and 23 June in Annecy, France

=== Team standings ===
Men
Pos.	Nation	Points
1	Germany	109
2	France	107
3	Russia	96
4	Great Britain	95
5	Italy	91.5
6	Poland	87
7	Ukraine	64.5
8	Finland	61

Women
Pos.	Nation	Points
1	Russia	122.5
2	Germany	103
3	France	89
4	Romania	88
5	Great Britain	80.5
6	Poland	75.5
7	Ukraine	73.5
8	Italy	73

Italy kept its position in the women's Super League as the host of the next edition. Top six teams qualified for the 2003 European Indoor Cup.

=== Results summary ===
==== Men's events ====
Event	Gold		Silver		Bronze	
100 m (Wind: +0.2 m/s)	Issa-Aimé Nthépé; France	10.27	Konstantin Rurak; Ukraine	10.31	Francesco Scuderi; Italy	10.35
200 m (Wind: -0.4 m/s)	Marlon Devonish; Great Britain	20.27	Marcin Urbaś; Poland	20.45	Marco Torrieri; Italy	20.65
400 m	Daniel Caines; Great Britain	45.14	Ingo Schultz; Germany	45.33	Marek Plawgo; Poland	45.35
800 m	Yuriy Borzakovskiy; Russia	1:46.58	Nils Schumann; Germany	1:46.99	Paweł Czapiewski; Poland	1:47.92
1500 m	Mehdi Baala; France	3:47.21	Michael East; Great Britain	3:48.26	Paweł Czapiewski; Poland	3:48.77
3000 m	Driss Maazouzi; France	7:53.41	Mikhail Yeginov; Russia	7:54.05	Jan Fitschen; Germany	7:54.92
5000 m	Dmitriy Maksimov; Russia	14:09.92	Sam Haughian; Great Britain	14:11.60	Ismaïl Sghyr; France	14:14.00
3000 m steeplechase	Bouabdellah Tahri; France	8:30.22	Damian Kallabis; Germany	8:32.04	Roman Usov; Russia	8:34.10
110 m hurdles (Wind: +0.7 m/s)	Colin Jackson; Great Britain	13.15	Mike Fenner; Germany	13.33	Andrea Giaconi; Italy	13.35
400 m hurdles	Fabrizio Mori; Italy	48.41	Stéphane Diagana; France	48.45	Chris Rawlinson; Great Britain	48.87
4 × 100 m	Germany; Ronny Ostwald; Alexander Kosenkow; Marc Blume; Thomas Müller	38.88	Italy; Francesco Scuderi; Alessandro Cavallaro; Marco Torrieri; Stefano Dacastello	38.89	Poland; Piotr Balcerzak; Marcin Jędrusiński; Marcin Urbaś; Zbigniew Tulin	39.08
4 × 400 m	Great Britain; Jared Deacon; Timothy Benjamin; Jamie Baulch; Daniel Caines	3:00.57	Germany; Ingo Schultz; Jens Dautzenberg; Ruwen Faller; Bastian Swillims	3:00.80	France; Leslie Djhone; Stéphane Diagana; Naman Keïta; Marc Raquil	3:00.92
High jump	Grégory Gabella; France	2.30	Yaroslav Rybakov; Russia	2.28	Grzegorz Sposób; Poland	2.25
Pole vault	Tim Lobinger; Germany	5.75	Giuseppe Gibilisco; Italy; Denis Yurchenko; Ukraine	5.70		
Long jump	Chris Tomlinson; Great Britain	8.17	Nicola Trentin; Italy	8.15	Salim Sdiri; France	8.03
Triple jump	Jonathan Edwards; Great Britain	17.19	Fabrizio Donato; Italy	17.17	Charles Friedek; Germany	17.11
Shot put	Yuriy Bilonog; Ukraine	20.55	Ville Tiisanoja; Finland	20.29	Paolo Dal Soglio; Italy	19.87
Discus throw	Michael Möllenbeck; Germany	66.82	Dmitriy Shevchenko; Russia	62.03	Olgierd Stański; Poland	60.88
Hammer throw	Olli-Pekka Karjalainen; Finland	79.25	Andrey Skvaruk; Ukraine	79.04	Maciej Pałyszko; Poland	78.25
Javelin throw	Sergey Makarov; Russia	88:24.	Steve Backley; Great Britain	85.03	Boris Henry; Germany	83.90
WR world record | AR area record | CR championship record | GR games record | NR national record | OR Olympic record | PB personal best | SB season best | WL world leading (in a given season)

==== Women's events ====
Event	Gold		Silver		Bronze	
100 m (Wind: +0.4 m/s)	Muriel Hurtis; France	10.96	Manuela Levorato; Italy	11.20	Yuliya Tabakova; Russia	11.24
200 m (Wind: +0.6 m/s)	Muriel Hurtis; France	22.51	Manuela Levorato; Italy	22.76	Sina Schielke; Germany	22.91
400 m	Antonina Yefremova; Ukraine	50.70	Grażyna Prokopek; Poland	51.34	Francine Landre; France	51.78
800 m	Irina Mistyukevich; Russia	1:59.76	Elisabeth Grousselle; France	1:59.95	Ivonne Teichmann; Germany	2:00.07
1500 m	Maria Cioncan; Romania	4:03.74	Lidia Chojecka; Poland	4:04.84	Tatyana Tomashova; Russia	4:05.14
3000 m	Gabriela Szabo; Romania	8:38.03	Yelena Zadorozhnaya; Russia	8:39.84	Lidia Chojecka; Poland	8:49.95
5000 m	Olga Yegorova; Russia	16:04.26	Joanne Pavey; Great Britain	16:06.65	Fatima Yvelain; France	16:08.21
3000 m steeplechase	Justyna Bąk; Poland	9:43.38	Cristina Casandra; Romania	9:49.51	Melanie Schulz; Germany	9:49.79
100 m hurdles (Wind: -0.2 m/s)	Patricia Girard; France	12.64	Kirsten Bolm; Germany	12.85	Mariya Koroteyeva; Russia	12.94
400 m hurdles	Yuliya Pechonkina; Russia	53.38; CR	Anna Olichwierczuk; Poland	55.11	Natasha Danvers; Great Britain	55.68
4 × 100 m	France; Patricia Girard; Muriel Hurtis; Sylviane Félix; Odiah Sidibé	42.41	Germany; Melanie Paschke; Gabriele Rockmeier; Sina Schielke; Marion Wagner	42.49	Russia; Natalya Ignatova; Irina Khabarova; Marina Kislova; Yuliya Tabakova	43.11
4 × 400 m	Great Britain; Catherine Murphy; Helen Frost; Helen Karagounis; Lee McConnell	3:27.87	Germany; Nicole Marahrens; Claudia Marx; Birgit Rockmeier; Florence Ekpo-Umoh	3:28.72	Italy; Daniela Reina; Daniela Graglia; Manuela Levorato; Danielle Perpoli	3:29.14
High jump	Irina Mikhalchenko; Ukraine	1.95	Oana Pantelimon; Romania	1.93	Kathryn Holinski; Germany	1.93
Pole vault	Svetlana Feofanova; Russia	4.70; CR	Yvonne Buschbaum; Germany	4.60	Vanessa Boslak; France	4.45
Long jump	Tatyana Kotova; Russia	7.42; CR	Cristina Nicolau; Romania	6.65	Bianca Kappler; Germany	6.64
Triple jump	Anna Pyatykh; Russia	14.67	Ashia Hansen; Great Britain	14.62	Magdelín Martínez; Italy	14.54
Shot put	Svetlana Krivelyova; Russia	19.63	Astrid Kumbernuss; Germany	19.61	Krystyna Zabawska; Poland	18.52
Discus throw	Natalya Sadova; Russia	65.91	Nicoleta Grasu; Romania	63.05	Franka Dietzsch; Germany	59.30
Hammer throw	Olga Kuzenkova; Russia	73.07	Manuela Montebrun; France	68.53	Irina Sekachova; Ukraine	66.88
Javelin throw	Tatyana Shikolenko; Russia	64.81	Felicia Moldovan; Romania	61.59	Steffi Nerius; Germany	59.98
WR world record | AR area record | CR championship record | GR games record | NR national record | OR Olympic record | PB personal best | SB season best | WL world leading (in a given season)

== First League ==
The First League was held on 22 and 23 June

=== Men ===
Group A
Held in Banská Bystrica, Slovakia

Pos.	Nation	Points
1	Greece	124
2	Czech Republic	107
3	Hungary	101
4	Belgium	85
5	Slovakia	82
6	Norway	79
7	Romania	74
8	Lithuania	61

Group B
Held in Seville, Spain

Pos.	Nation	Points
1	Spain	132
2	Sweden	122
3	Netherlands	100
4	Portugal	91
5	Slovenia	77
6	Denmark	77
7	Switzerland	70
8	Austria	48

=== Women ===
Group A
Held in Banská Bystrica, Slovakia

Pos.	Nation	Points
1	Greece	133
2	Hungary	107
3	Czech Republic	107
4	Bulgaria	104.5
5	Finland	99.5
6	Slovakia	63
7	Norway	59
8	Turkey	46

Group B
Held in Seville, Spain

Pos.	Nation	Points
1	Spain	128
2	Sweden	111
3	Belarus	106.5
4	Portugal	88.5
5	Slovenia	88
6	Netherlands	73
7	Switzerland	72.5
8	Latvia	51.5

The winner of each group also qualified for the 2003 European Indoor Cup.

== Second League ==
The Second League was held on 22 and 23 June

=== Men ===
Group A
Held in Tallinn, Estonia

Pos.	Nation	Points
1	Belarus	127
2	Estonia	118
3	Ireland	114.5
4	Latvia	94
5	Cyprus	87.5
6	Iceland	74
7	Georgia	48
8	Luxembourg	47

Group B
Held in Belgrade, Yugoslavia

Pos.	Nation	Points
1	Bulgaria	173
2	Israel	167.5
3	Croatia	157
4	Moldova	150
5	Turkey	149.5
6	Yugoslavia	140
7	Bosnia and Herzegovina	111
8	Armenia	83
9	AASSE	62
10	Macedonia	59
11	Albania	49

=== Women ===
Group A
Held in Tallinn, Estonia

Pos.	Nation	Points
1	Ireland	129
2	Lithuania	124
3	Estonia	112
4	Denmark	106
5	Cyprus	95
6	Iceland	75
7	Georgia	40
8	Luxembourg	35

Group B
Held in Belgrade, Yugoslavia

Pos.	Nation	Points
1	Belgium	173
2	Yugoslavia	163
3	Austria	145.5
4	Croatia	136
5	Moldova	117
6	Israel	107
7	Albania	82.5
8	Bosnia and Herzegovina	52
9	Macedonia	44
10	AASSE	38
