= Renáta Medgyesová =

Slovak athlete (born 1983)

Renáta Medgyesová (born 28 January 1983 in Komárno) is a former Slovak athlete, competing in the long jump, triple jump and high jump.

== Achievements ==
Year	Competition	Venue	Position	Event	Notes
Representing Slovakia
1997	European Junior Championships	Ljubljana, Slovenia	6th	High jump	1.85 m
1998	World Junior Championships	Annecy, France	13th (q)	High jump	1.81 m
1999	World Youth Championships	Bydgoszcz, Poland	2nd	High jump	1.83 m
1999	World Youth Championships	Bydgoszcz, Poland	5th	Triple jump	13.22 m
1999	European Junior Championships	Riga, Latvia	7th	High jump	1.82 m
2000	European Indoor Championships	Ghent, Belgium	17th (q)	High jump	1.80 m
2000	World Junior Championships	Santiago, Chile	17th (q)	High jump	1.80 m
2001	European Junior Championships	Grosseto, Italy	11th	High jump	1.83 m
2002	European Indoor Championships	Vienna, Austria	16th (q)	High jump	1.84 m
2002	World Junior Championships	Kingston, Jamaica	5th	High jump	1.85 m
2010	European Championships	Barcelona, Spain	7th	Long jump	6.71 m
2011	European Indoor Championships	Paris, France	16th (q)	Long jump	6.37 m
2012	European Championships	Helsinki, Finland	27th (q)	Long jump	5.95 m
2013	European Indoor Championships	Gothenburg, Sweden	12th (q)	Long jump	6.35 m
2015	European Indoor Championships	Prague, Czech Republic	20th (q)	Long jump	6.04 m
