= 2001 IAAF World Indoor Championships – Women's high jump =

The women's high jump event at the 2001 IAAF World Indoor Championships was held on March 9.

== Results ==
| Rank | Athlete | Nationality | 1.80 | 1.85 | 1.90 | 1.93 | 1.96 | 1.98 | 2.00 | 2.02 | Result | Notes |
|---|---|---|---|---|---|---|---|---|---|---|---|---|
| 1st place, gold medalist(s) | Kajsa Bergqvist | Sweden | o | o | o | xo | o | o | o | xxx | 2.00 | WL |
| 2nd place, silver medalist(s) | Inga Babakova | Ukraine | o | o | o | o | o | o | xxo | xxx | 2.00 | =WL |
| 3rd place, bronze medalist(s) | Venelina Veneva | Bulgaria | – | o | o | o | o | xxx | | | 1.96 | |
| 4 | Amy Acuff | United States | o | o | o | xo | o | x– | xx | | 1.96 | PB |
| 5 | Dóra Győrffy | Hungary | o | o | o | o | xxx | | | | 1.93 | |
| 5 | Viktoriya Palamar | Ukraine | o | o | o | o | xxx | | | | 1.93 | |
| 7 | Ruth Beitia | Spain | o | o | xxo | o | xxx | | | | 1.93 | |
| 8 | Monica Iagăr-Dinescu | Romania | o | o | o | xxo | xxx | | | | 1.93 | |
| 9 | Svetlana Zalevskaya | Kazakhstan | o | o | o | xxx | | | | | 1.90 | |
| 10 | Marta Mendía | Spain | o | xo | o | xxx | | | | | 1.90 | |
| 11 | Yelena Gulyayeva | Russia | xxo | xxo | xxo | xxx | | | | | 1.90 | |
| 12 | Yuliya Lyakhova | Russia | o | o | xxx | | | | | | 1.85 | |
| 13 | Elena Herzenberg | Germany | o | xxx | | | | | | | 1.80 | |
