= Athletics at the 2003 Summer Universiade – Women's high jump =

The women's high jump event at the 2003 Summer Universiade was held on 29 August in Daegu, South Korea.

== Results ==
Rank	Athlete	Nationality	1.60	1.70	1.80	1.85	1.88	1.91	1.94	1.96	Result	Notes
1st place, gold medalist(s)	Dóra Győrffy	Hungary	–	–	o	o	o	o	o	xxx	1.94	
2nd place, silver medalist(s)	Anna Ksok	Poland	–	o	o	o	o	xo	o	xxx	1.94	
3rd place, bronze medalist(s)	Yelena Slesarenko	Russia	–	–	o	o	o	o	xxo	xxx	1.94	
4	Candeğer Kılınçer	Turkey	–	o	o	xxo	o	o	xxx		1.91	
5	Kärt Siilats	Estonia	–	o	o	xo	o	xxx			1.88	
6	Olena Holosha	Ukraine	–	o	o	o	xxo	xxx			1.88	
7	Corinne Müller	Switzerland	–	–	xo	xo	xxx				1.85	
8	Sónia Carvalho	Portugal	–	o	o	xxo	xxx				1.85	
9	Marizca Gertenbach	South Africa	–	o	o	xxx					1.80	
9	Barbora Laláková	Czech Republic	–	o	o	xxx					1.80	
11	Zhao Ning	China	–	o	xo	xxx					1.80	
12	Jing Xuezhu	China	–	o	xxo	xxx					1.80	
13	Son Yang-mi	South Korea	–	xo	xxx						1.70	
14	Mama Gassama	Gambia	o	xxx							1.60	
	Veera Baranova	Estonia									DNS	
	Jane Jamieson	Australia									DNS	
