= 1997 IAAF World Indoor Championships – Women's high jump =

The women's high jump event at the 1997 IAAF World Indoor Championships was held on March 7–8.

== Medalists ==
Gold	Silver	Bronze
Stefka Kostadinova; Bulgaria	Inha Babakova; Ukraine	Hanne Haugland; Norway

== Results ==
=== Qualification ===
Qualification: 1.95 (Q) or at least 12 best performers (q) qualified for the final.

Rank	Group	Athlete	Nationality	1.75	1.80	1.85	1.90	1.93	1.95	Result	Notes
1	A	Inha Babakova	Ukraine	–	–	o	o	o	xo	1.95	Q
2	A	Alina Astafei	Germany	–	–	o	o	o	–	1.93	q
2	A	Yuliya Lyakhova	Russia	–	o	o	o	o	–	1.93	q
2	B	Stefka Kostadinova	Bulgaria	–	–	o	o	o	–	1.93	q
2	B	Ioamnet Quintero	Cuba	–	o	o	o	o	–	1.93	q
6	B	Britta Bilač	Slovenia	–	o	o	xo	o	–	1.93	q
7	B	Viktoriya Fyodorova	Russia	–	o	xxo	o	o	–	1.93	q
8	A	Kajsa Bergqvist	Sweden	–	xo	o	o	xxo	xxx	1.93	q
8	A	Olga Bolşova	Moldova	–	o	o	xo	xxo	xxx	1.93	q
8	B	Nelė Žilinskienė	Lithuania	–	o	o	xo	xxo	–	1.93	q
11	B	Hanne Haugland	Norway	–	o	o	xxo	xxo	–	1.93	q
12	A	Monica Iagăr	Romania	–	o	xo	o	xxx		1.90	q
12	B	Debbie Marti	Great Britain	xo	o	o	o	xxx		1.90	q
14	A	Zuzana Kováčiková	Czech Republic	o	o	xxo	o	xxx		1.90	
15	B	Angela Bradburn	United States	–	o	o	xo	xxx		1.90	
16	B	Pia Zinck	Denmark	–	o	xo	xxo	xxx		1.90	NR
17	A	Zhang Liwen	China	o	o	o	xxx			1.85	SB
17	B	Mária Melová	Slovakia	–	o	o	xxx			1.85	
19	A	Sieglinde Cadusch	Switzerland	–	o	xo	xxx			1.85	
20	A	Svetlana Zalevskaya	Kazakhstan	–	xo	xo	xxx			1.85	
21	A	Michelle Dunkley	Great Britain	o	o	xxx				1.80	
21	A	Karol Jenkins	United States	–	o	xxx				1.80	
21	A	Solange Witteveen	Argentina	o	o	xxx				1.80	
21	B	Iryna Mykhalchenko	Ukraine	o	o	xxx				1.80	
25	B	Dóra Győrffy	Hungary	o	xo	xxx				1.80	

=== Final ===
Rank	Name	Nationality	1.85	1.90	1.95	1.98	2.00	2.02	2.08	Result	Notes
1st place, gold medalist(s)	Stefka Kostadinova	Bulgaria	o	o	o	o	o	o	xxx	2.02	WL
2nd place, silver medalist(s)	Inha Babakova	Ukraine	o	o	o	o	o	xxx		2.00	NR
3rd place, bronze medalist(s)	Hanne Haugland	Norway	o	xo	o	xxo	o	xxx		2.00	NR
4	Alina Astafei	Germany	o	o	o	xxx				1.95	SB
5	Ioamnet Quintero	Cuba	xo	o	o	xxx				1.95	SB
6	Nelė Žilinskienė	Lithuania	o	o	xo	xxx				1.95	NR
7	Viktoriya Fyodorova	Russia	o	o	xxo	xxx				1.95	SB
8	Kajsa Bergqvist	Sweden	o	xo	xxo	xxx				1.95	NR
9	Olga Bolşova	Moldova	o	o	xxx					1.90	
9	Monica Iagăr	Romania	o	o	xxx					1.90	
9	Yuliya Lyakhova	Russia	o	o	xxx					1.90	
12	Britta Bilač	Slovenia	xo	o	xxx					1.90	
13	Debbie Marti	Great Britain	o	xxx						1.85	
