= 1998 World Junior Championships in Athletics – Women's high jump =

The women's high jump event at the 1998 World Junior Championships in Athletics was held in Annecy, France, at Parc des Sports on 31 July and 1 August.

== Medalists ==
Gold	Marina Kuptsova; Russia
Silver	Marie Norrman; Sweden
Bronze	Nevena Lenđel; Croatia
Bronze	Tatyana Yefimenko; Kyrgyzstan

== Results ==
=== Final ===
1 August

Rank	Name	Nationality	Result	Notes
1st place, gold medalist(s)	Marina Kuptsova	Russia	1.88	
2nd place, silver medalist(s)	Marie Norrman	Sweden	1.88	
3rd place, bronze medalist(s)	Nevena Lenđel	Croatia	1.84	
3rd place, bronze medalist(s)	Tatyana Yefimenko	Kyrgyzstan	1.84	
5	Whitney Evans	Canada	1.80	
5	Viktoriya Slivka	Russia	1.80	
7	Kärt Siilats	Estonia	1.80	
8	Ruth Beitía	Spain	1.80	
9	Kathleen Kirst	Germany	1.80	
9	Jenny Isgren	Sweden	1.80	
11	Stefania Cadamuro	Italy	1.75	
	Jacqueline Fourie	South Africa	NH	

=== Qualifications ===
31 Jul

==== Group A ====
Rank	Name	Nationality	Result	Notes
1	Tatyana Yefimenko	Kyrgyzstan	1.84	Q
1	Viktoriya Slivka	Russia	1.84	Q
3	Kärt Siilats	Estonia	1.84	Q
4	Kathleen Kirst	Germany	1.81	q
5	Jenny Isgren	Sweden	1.81	q
6	Jacqueline Fourie	South Africa	1.81	q
7	Renáta Medgyesová	Slovakia	1.81	
8	Delfina Blaquier	Argentina	1.78	
9	Marina Shafran	Israel	1.78	
10	Nakeitra Jones	United States	1.78	
11	Marianne Mattas	Finland	1.78	
12	Anne-Gaëlle Jardin	France	1.75	

==== Group B ====
Rank	Name	Nationality	Result	Notes
1	Marina Kuptsova	Russia	1.84	Q
2	Ruth Beitía	Spain	1.84	Q
3	Stefania Cadamuro	Italy	1.81	q
3	Marie Norrman	Sweden	1.81	q
5	Nevena Lenđel	Croatia	1.81	q
6	Whitney Evans	Canada	1.81	q
7	Henrike Ripken	Germany	1.81	
8	Hanna Mikkonen	Finland	1.78	
9	Gaëlle Niaré	France	1.78	
10	Robin Burkhardt	United States	1.78	
11	Nicolize Steyn	South Africa	1.78	
12	Barbora Laláková	Czech Republic	1.70	

== Participation ==
According to an unofficial count, 24 athletes from 17 countries participated in the event.

- Argentina (1)
- Canada (1)
- Croatia (1)
- Czech Republic (1)
- Estonia (1)
- Finland (2)
- France (2)
- Germany (2)
- Israel (1)
- Italy (1)
- Kyrgyzstan (1)
- Russia (2)
- Slovakia (1)
- South Africa (2)
- Spain (1)
- Sweden (2)
- United States (2)
