= Athletics at the 2000 Summer Olympics – Women's high jump =

Women's high jump at the Games of the XXVII Olympiad
- Pictogram for athletics
- Venue: Stadium Australia
- Date: 28 September 2000 (qualifications); 30 September 2000 (final)
- Competitors: 37 from 27 nations
- Winning height: 2.01

Medalists
1st place, gold medalist(s)		Yelena Yelesina; Russia
2nd place, silver medalist(s)		Hestrie Cloete; South Africa
3rd place, bronze medalist(s)		Kajsa Bergqvist; Sweden
3rd place, bronze medalist(s)		Oana Pantelimon; Romania

The women's high jump at the 2000 Summer Olympics as part of the athletics program was held at the Stadium Australia on Thursday, 28 September and Saturday, 30 September.

== Medalists ==
Gold	Yelena Yelesina; Russia
Silver	Hestrie Cloete; South Africa
Bronze	Kajsa Bergqvist; Sweden
Bronze	Oana Pantelimon; Romania

== Schedule ==
- All times are Australian Eastern Standard Time (UTC+10)

Qualification Round
Group A	Group B
28.09.2000 – 09:45h	28.09.2000 – 09:45h
Final Round
30.09.2000 – 19:00h

== Records ==
Standing records prior to the 2000 Summer Olympics
World Record	Stefka Kostadinova (BUL)	2.09 m	30 August 1987	Rome, Italy
Olympic Record	Stefka Kostadinova (BUL)	2.05 m	3 August 1996	Atlanta, United States

== Results ==
All distances shown are in meters.

- DNS denotes did not start.
- DNF denotes did not finish.
- DQ denotes disqualification.
- NR denotes national record.
- AR denotes area/continental record.
- OR denotes Olympic record.
- WR denotes world record.
- PB denotes personal best.
- SB denotes season best

=== Qualifying round ===
Rank	Group	Name	Nationality	1.80	1.85	1.89	1.92	1.94	Result	Notes
1	A	Kajsa Bergqvist	Sweden	–	o	o	o	o	1.94	Q
1	A	Viktoriya Palamar	Ukraine	o	o	o	o	o	1.94	Q
1	A	Yelena Yelesina	Russia	o	o	o	o	o	1.94	Q
1	A	Svetlana Zalevskaya	Kazakhstan	o	o	o	o	o	1.94	Q
1	B	Inha Babakova	Ukraine	o	o	o	o	o	1.94	Q
1	B	Hestrie Cloete	South Africa	o	o	o	o	o	1.94	Q
1	B	Amewu Mensah	Germany	o	o	o	o	o	1.94	Q
1	B	Eleonora Milusheva	Bulgaria	o	o	o	o	o	1.94	Q
9	A	Venelina Veneva	Bulgaria	o	o	o	xxo	o	1.94	Q
10	B	Zuzana Hlavoňová	Czech Republic	xxo	o	o	xo	o	1.94	Q
10	B	Monica Iagăr	Romania	o	o	xo	xxo	o	1.94	Q
12	A	Oana Pantelimon	Romania	o	xxo	xo	o	xxo	1.94	Q, SB
12	B	Yoko Ota	Japan	xo	o	xo	xo	xxo	1.94	Q
14	A	Ioamnet Quintero	Cuba	o	o	o	o	xxx	1.92	
15	A	Svetlana Lapina	Russia	o	o	xo	xo	xxx	1.92	
16	A	Miki Imai	Japan	o	o	xxo	xo	xxx	1.92	
17	B	Blanka Vlašić	Croatia	o	o	o	xxo	xxx	1.92	
18	A	Dóra Győrffy	Hungary	o	o	o	xxx		1.89	
18	B	Hanne Haugland	Norway	o	o	o	xxx		1.89	
20	B	Solange Witteveen	Argentina	o	xo	o	xxx		1.89	
21	A	Nelė Žilinskienė	Lithuania	o	o	xo	xxx		1.89	
22	A	Marta Mendía	Spain	o	xo	xo	xxx		1.89	
23	A	Inna Gliznutsa	Moldova	o	xo	xxo	xxx		1.89	
24	B	Karol Damon	United States	o	xxo	xxo	xxx		1.89	
25	B	Linda Horvath	Austria	xo	xxo	xxo	xxx		1.89	
26	A	Erin Aldrich	United States	o	o	xxx			1.85	
26	B	Marina Kuptsova	Russia	o	o	xxx			1.85	
28	B	Olga Bolşova	Moldova	o	xo	xxx			1.85	
29	B	Iryna Mykhalchenko	Ukraine	o	xxo	xxx			1.85	
30	B	Tatyana Shevchik	Belarus	xo	xxo	xxx			1.85	
31	B	Amy Acuff	United States	o	xxx				1.80	
32	A	Alison Inverarity	Australia	xo	xxx				1.80	
33	A	Agni Charalambous	Cyprus	xxo	xxx				1.80	
33	B	Niki Bakogianni	Greece	xxo	xxx				1.80	
	A	Hristina Kalcheva	Bulgaria	xxx					NM	
	A	Karen Beautle	Jamaica	xxx					NM	
	A	Līga Kļaviņa	Latvia	xxx					NM	
	B	Tatyana Efimenko	Kyrgyzstan	xxx					NM	

- NM = no mark
- All four athletes who failed to register a height, had three failures at 1.80 m.

=== Final ===
Rank	Name	Nationality	1.85	1.90	1.93	1.96	1.99	2.01	2.03	Result	Notes
1st place, gold medalist(s)	Yelena Yelesina	Russia	o	o	o	o	o	xo	xxx	2.01	SB
2nd place, silver medalist(s)	Hestrie Cloete	South Africa	o	o	o	xo	o	xo	xxx	2.01	SB
3rd place, bronze medalist(s)	Kajsa Bergqvist	Sweden	o	o	o	o	xo	x–	xx	1.99	
3rd place, bronze medalist(s)	Oana Pantelimon	Romania	o	o	o	o	xo	xxx		1.99	PB
5	Inha Babakova	Ukraine	o	o	xo	o	xxx			1.96	
6	Svetlana Zalevskaya	Kazakhstan	xo	xo	o	o	xxx			1.96	
7	Viktoriya Palamar	Ukraine	o	o	xo	xxo	xxx			1.96	
8	Amewu Mensah	Germany	o	o	o	xxx				1.93	
9	Venelina Veneva	Bulgaria	o	o	xo	xxx				1.93	
9	Monica Iagăr	Romania	o	o	xo	xxx				1.93	
11	Yoko Ota	Japan	o	xo	–	xxx				1.90	
11	Zuzana Hlavoňová	Czech Republic	o	xo	xxx					1.90	
13	Eleonora Milusheva	Bulgaria	xo	xo	xxx					1.90	
