= Marta Mendía =

Spanish high jumper (born 1975)

Personal information
- Born: 18 May 1975 (age 51) Burlada, Navarra, Spain

Sport
- Sport: Track and field
Medal record
Representing Spain
Mediterranean Games
Bronze medal – third place	2005 Almeria	High jump

Marta Mendía Valencia (born 18 May 1975) is a former high jumper from Spain. Her personal best jumps are 1.95 metres outdoors and 1.96 metres indoors.

== Competition record ==
Year	Competition	Venue	Position	Notes
Representing Spain
1994	World Junior Championships	Lisbon, Portugal	19th (q)	1.75 m
1997	European U23 Championships	Turku, Finland	8th	1.80 m
1998	European Indoor Championships	Valencia, Spain	8th	1.85 m
1998	Ibero-American Championships	Lisbon, Portugal	3rd	1.81 m
1999	Universiade	Palma de Mallorca, Spain	6th	1.88 m
1999	World Championships	Seville, Spain	19th (q)	1.89 m
2000	European Indoor Championships	Ghent, Belgium	12th (q)	1.85 m
2000	Ibero-American Championships	Rio de Janeiro, Brazil	2nd	1.84 m
2000	Olympic Games	Athens, Greece	22nd (q)	1.89 m
2001	World Indoor Championships	Lisbon, Portugal	10th	1.90 m
2001	World Championships	Edmonton, Canada	21st (q)	1.85 m
2002	European Indoor Championships	Vienna, Austria	16th (q)	1.84 m
2002	European Championships	Munich, Germany	14th (q)	1.87 m
2003	World Championships	Paris, France	13th (q)	1.91 m
2004	World Indoor Championships	Budapest, Hungary	6th	1.94 m
2004	Ibero-American Championships	Huelva, Spain	2nd	1.94 m
2004	Olympic Games	Athens, Greece	10th	1.93 m
2005	European Indoor Championships	Madrid, Spain	4th	1.95 m
2005	Mediterranean Games	Almería, Spain	3rd	1.89 m
2005	World Championships	Helsinki, Finland	15th (q)	1.88 m
2006	World Indoor Championships	Gothenburg, Sweden	9th (q)	1.93 m
2006	Ibero-American Championships	Ponce, Puerto Rico	1st	1.84 m
2006	European Championships	Gothenburg, Sweden	15th (q)	1.90 m
2007	European Indoor Championships	Birmingham, United Kingdom	7th	1.87 m
2007	World Championships	Osaka, Japan	22nd (q)	1.88 m
