= Anna Ksok =

Polish high jumper

Anna Ksok (born 29 September 1983 in Wrocław) is a retired Polish athlete specialising in the high jump. She won the silver at the 2003 Summer Universiade.

Her personal best jump is 1.94 metres, both indoors and outdoors.

== Competition record ==
Year	Competition	Venue	Position	Notes
Representing Poland
1999	World Youth Championships	Bydgoszcz, Poland	9th	1.75 m
2000	World Junior Championships	Santiago, Chile	15th (q)	1.80 m
2001	European Junior Championships	Amsterdam, Netherlands	3rd	1.90 m
2002	European Indoor Championships	Vienna, Austria	5th	1.90 m
2002	World Junior Championships	Kingston, Jamaica	2nd	1.87 m
2002	European Championships	Munich, Germany	5th	1.89 m
2003	World Indoor Championships	Birmingham, United Kingdom	15th (q)	1.90 m
2003	European U23 Championships	Bydgoszcz, Poland	3rd	1.92 m
2003	Universiade	Daegu, South Korea	2nd	1.94 m
2005	European U23 Championships	Erfurt, Germany	4th	1.87 m
