= Iryna Mykhalchenko =

Ukrainian high jumper (born 1972)

Personal information
- Born: 20 January 1972 (age 54) Novokuznetsk, Soviet Union

Sport
- Sport: Track and field
Medal record
Representing Ukraine
European Cup
Gold medal – first place	2002 Annecy	High jump
Silver medal – second place	2004 Bydgoszcz	High jump
World Athletics Final
Silver medal – second place	2005 Monte Carlo	High jump

Iryna Mykhalchenko (Ukrainian: Ірина Михальченко; born 20 January 1972) is a Ukrainian high jumper.

== Biography ==
Mykhalchenko competed in two Olympic Games, finishing fifth in the high jump contest at the 2004 Summer Olympics. She then finished second at the 2004 IAAF World Athletics Final, third at the 2005 IAAF World Athletics Final and sixth in the 2006 European Athletics Championships.

Her personal best performance is 2.01 metres, achieved in July 2004 at the Internationales Hochsprung-Meeting Eberstadt, placing her in the elite Female two metres club.

== Competition record ==
Year	Competition	Venue	Position	Notes
Representing Ukraine
1996	European Indoor Championships	Stockholm, Sweden	13th (q)	1.88 m
1997	World Indoor Championships	Paris, France	21st (q)	1.80 m
1997	Universiade	Catania, Italy	13th (q)	1.85 m
1998	European Championships	Budapest, Hungary	13th (q)	1.90 m
1999	Universiade	Palma de Mallorca, Spain	6th	1.88 m
1999	World Championships	Seville, Spain	14th (q)	1.89 m
2000	Olympic Games	Sydney, Australia	29th (q)	1.85 m
2002	European Indoor Championships	Vienna, Austria	9th (q)	1.92 m
2002	European Championships	Munich, Germany	9th	1.89 m
2003	World Indoor Championships	Birmingham, United Kingdom	5th	1.96 m
2004	Olympic Games	Athens, Greece	5th	1.96 m
2005	World Championships	Helsinki, Finland	12th	1.85 m
2006	European Championships	Gothenburg, Sweden	6th	1.95 m

== See also ==
- Female two metres club
