= Athletics at the 2003 Pan American Games – Women's high jump =

Women's high jump at the Pan American Games

The final of the Women's High Jump event at the 2003 Pan American Games took place on Friday August 8, 2003.

== Medalists ==
Gold	Juana Arrendel; Dominican Republic
Silver	Romary Rifka; Mexico
Bronze	Yarianny Argüelles; Cuba

== Records ==
World Record	Stefka Kostadinova (BUL)	2.09 m	August 30, 1987	Rome, Italy
Pan Am Record	Coleen Sommer (USA)	1.96 m	August 13, 1987	Indianapolis, United States

== Results ==
Rank	Athlete	Jumps								Final
Rank	Athlete	1	2	3	4	5	6	7	8	Result
1	Juana Arrendel (DOM)	1.80-O	1.83-O	1.86-O	1.89-O	1.92-XO	1.94-XO	1.96-XXX		1.94 m
2	Romary Rifka (MEX)	1.75-O	1.80-O	1.83-XO	1.86-O	1.89-XO	1.92-O	1.94-XO	1.96-XXX	1.94 m
3	Yarianny Argüelles (CUB)	1.80-O	1.83-O	1.86-O	1.89-O	1.92-XXX				1.89 m
4	Stacy Ann Grant (USA)	1.70-O	1.75-O	1.80-O	1.83-O	1.86-XXO	1.89-XXX			1.86 m
5	Levern Spencer (LCA)	1.65-O	1.75-O	1.80-O	1.83-XXO	1.86-XXX				1.83 m
6	Ifoma Jones (USA)	1.75-O	1.80-XO	1.83-XXO	1.86-XXX					1.83 m
7	Solange Witteveen (ARG)	1.75-O	1.80-O	1.83-XXX						1.80 m
7	Nicole Forrester (CAN)	1.80-O	1.83-XXX							1.80 m
9	Peaches Roach (JAM)	1.65-O	1.70-O	1.75-O	1.80-XO	1.83-XXX				1.80 m
10	Luciane Dambacher (BRA)	1.65-O	1.70-O	1.75-O	1.80-XXX					1.75 m
11	Desiree Crichlow (BAR)	1.65-O	1.75-XO	1.80-XXX						1.75 m

== See also ==
- 2003 World Championships in Athletics – Women's high jump
- 2003 High Jump Year Ranking
- Athletics at the 2004 Summer Olympics – Women's high jump
