= 2001 European Athletics U23 Championships – Women's high jump =

The women's high jump event at the 2001 European Athletics U23 Championships was held in Amsterdam, Netherlands, at Olympisch Stadion on 13 and 15 July.

== Medalists ==
Gold	Ruth Beitia; Spain
Silver	Marina Kuptsova; Russia
Silver	Candeğer Kılınçer; Turkey

== Results ==
=== Final ===
15 July

Rank	Name	Nationality	Attempts					Result	Notes
Rank	Name	Nationality	1.78	1.81	1.84	1.87	1.90	Result	Notes
1st place, gold medalist(s)	Ruth Beitia	Spain	o	o	o	xo	xxx	1.87	
2nd place, silver medalist(s)	Marina Kuptsova	Russia	o	o	xo	xo	xxx	1.87	
2nd place, silver medalist(s)	Candeğer Kılınçer	Turkey	o	xo	o	xo	xxx	1.87	
4	Elena Herzenberg	Germany	o	xo	xo	xo	xxx	1.87	
5	Hanna Mikkonen	Finland	o	xxo	o	xxx		1.84	
6	Katja Schötz	Germany	xo	xo	xxo	xxx		1.84	
7	Heike Siener	Germany	o	o	xxx			1.81	
8	Barbora Laláková	Czech Republic	o	xo	xxx			1.81	
8	Olga Shedova	Belarus	o	xo	xxx			1.81	
10	Marianne Mattas	Finland	o	xxo	xxx			1.81	
11	Nevena Lenđel	Croatia	o	xxx				1.78	
12	Bernadett Bódi	Hungary	xxo	xxx				1.78	

=== Qualifications ===
13 July
Qualifying 1.87 or 12 best to the Final

==== Group A ====
Rank	Name	Nationality	Result	Notes
1	Hanna Mikkonen	Finland	1.84	q
2	Elena Herzenberg	Germany	1.84	q
3	Marina Kuptsova	Russia	1.84	q
4	Bernadett Bódi	Hungary	1.84	q
5	Barbora Laláková	Czech Republic	1.81	q
6	Kärt Siilats	Estonia	1.81	
7	Nadezhda Pekhlivanova	Bulgaria	1.81	
8	Anna Visigalli	Italy	1.81	
9	Christelle Préau	France	1.75	

==== Group B ====
Rank	Name	Nationality	Result	Notes
1	Nevena Lenđel	Croatia	1.84	q
1	Katja Schötz	Germany	1.84	q
1	Candeğer Kılınçer	Turkey	1.84	q
4	Marianne Mattas	Finland	1.84	q
5	Olga Shedova	Belarus	1.84	q
6	Ruth Beitia	Spain	1.84	q
7	Heike Siener	Germany	1.81	q
8	Sarah Bettoso	Italy	1.81	
	Līga Kļaviņa	Latvia	DNS	

== Participation ==
According to an unofficial count, 17 athletes from 13 countries participated in the event.

- Belarus (1)
- Bulgaria (1)
- Croatia (1)
- Czech Republic (1)
- Estonia (1)
- Finland (2)
- France (1)
- Germany (3)
- Hungary (1)
- Italy (2)
- Russia (1)
- Spain (1)
- Turkey (1)
