= Athletics at the 2004 Summer Olympics – Women's high jump =

Women's high jump at the Games of the XXVIII Olympiad
- Venue: Olympic Stadium
- Date: 26–28 August
- Competitors: 35 from 28 nations
- Winning height: 2.06 OR

Medalists
1st place, gold medalist(s)		Yelena Slesarenko	Russia
2nd place, silver medalist(s)		Hestrie Cloete	South Africa
3rd place, bronze medalist(s)		Vita Styopina	Ukraine

The women's high jump competition at the 2004 Summer Olympics in Athens was held at the Olympic Stadium on 26–28 August.

== Competition format ==
The competition consisted of two rounds, qualification and final. Athletes start with a qualifying round. Jumping in turn, each athlete attempts to achieve the qualifying height. If they fail at three jumps in a row, they are eliminated. After a successful jump, they receive three more attempts to achieve the next height. Once all jumps have been completed, all athletes who have achieved the qualifying height go through to the final. If fewer than 12 athletes achieve the qualifying standard, the best 12 athletes go through. Cleared heights reset for the final, which followed the same format until all athletes fail three consecutive jumps.

== Schedule ==
All times are Greece Standard Time (UTC+2)

Date	Time	Round
Thursday, 26 August 2004	20:00	Qualification
Saturday, 28 August 2004	19:00	Final

== Records ==
Prior to the competition, the existing world record, Olympic record, and world leading jump were as follows:

World record	Stefka Kostadinova (BUL)	2.09 m	Rome, Italy	30 August 1987
Olympic record	Stefka Kostadinova (BUL)	2.05 m	Atlanta, United States	3 August 1996
World Leading	Anna Chicherova (RUS)	2.04	Arnstadt, Germany	7 February 2004

The following record was established during the competition:

Date	Event	Name	Nationality	Result	Record
28 August	Final	Yelena Slesarenko	Russia	2.06 m	OR

== Results ==
=== Qualifying round ===
Rule: Qualifying standard 1.95 (Q) or at least best 12 qualified (q).

Rank	Group	Name	Nationality	1.75	1.80	1.85	1.89	1.92	1.95	Result	Notes
1	A	Hestrie Cloete	South Africa			o	o	o	o	1.95	Q
1	A	Vita Styopina	Ukraine		o	o	o	o	o	1.95	Q
1	B	Iryna Mykhalchenko	Ukraine		o	o	o	o	o	1.95	Q
4	A	Tia Hellebaut	Belgium	o	o	o	xo	o	o	1.95	Q, =NR
4	B	Anna Chicherova	Russia		o	o	o	xo	o	1.95	Q
4	B	Yelena Slesarenko	Russia		o	o	o	xo	o	1.95	Q
7	A	Blanka Vlašić	Croatia			xxo	xo	o	o	1.95	Q
8	B	Monica Iagăr	Romania		o	o	o	xo	xo	1.95	Q, =SB
8	B	Amy Acuff	United States		o	o	o	xo	xo	1.95	Q
10	A	Inha Babakova	Ukraine		o	o	o	o	xxx	1.92	q
11	B	Marta Mendía	Spain		o	o	xo	o	xxx	1.92	q
12	A	Oana Pantelimon	Romania		o	o	xxo	o	xxx	1.92	q, SB
13	A	Tatyana Novoseltseva	Russia		o	o	o	xo	xxx	1.92	
14	B	Romary Rifka	Mexico		o	o	xo	xxo	xxx	1.92	
15	B	Venelina Veneva	Bulgaria		o	o	xxo	xxo	xxx	1.92	
16	A	Ruth Beitia	Spain	o	o	o	o	xxx		1.89	
16	B	Tisha Waller	United States		o	o	o	xxx		1.89	
16	B	Jing Xuezhu	China	o	o	o	o	xxx		1.89	
16	B	Juana Arrendel	Dominican Republic		o	o	o	xxx		1.89	SB
16	B	Iva Straková	Czech Republic	o	o	o	o	xxx		1.89	
21	B	Noengrothai Chaipetch	Thailand	o	o	xo	o	xxx		1.89	
22	A	Candeğer Kilinçer	Turkey		o	o	xo	xxx		1.89	
23	A	Corinne Müller	Switzerland		o	o	xxo	xxx		1.89	
23	A	Solange Witteveen	Argentina	o	o	o	xxo	xxx		1.89	
23	B	Tatyana Efimenko	Kyrgyzstan		o	o	xxo	xxx		1.89	
26	A	Zuzana Hlavoňová	Czech Republic		o	o	xxx			1.85	
26	B	Inna Gliznuta	Moldova	o	o	o	xxx			1.85	
28	A	Bobby Aloysius	India	o	o	xo	xxx			1.85	
28	A	Chaunte Howard	United States		o	xo	xxx			1.85	
30	B	Caterine Ibargüen	Colombia		xo	xxo	xxx			1.85	
31	A	Marina Aitova	Kazakhstan	o	xxo	xxo	xxx			1.85	
31	B	Nikolia Mitropoulou	Greece		xxo	xxo	xxx			1.85	
33	A	Bùi Thị Nhung	Vietnam	o	o	xxx				1.80	
34	A	Petrina Price	Australia		xxo	xxx				1.80	

=== Final ===
Rank	Name	Nationality	1.85	1.89	1.93	1.96	1.99	2.02	2.04	2.06	2.10	Result	Notes
1st place, gold medalist(s)	Yelena Slesarenko	Russia	o	o	o	o	o	o	o	o	xxx	2.06	OR
2nd place, silver medalist(s)	Hestrie Cloete	South Africa	o	o	o	o	o	o	xx-	x		2.02	
3rd place, bronze medalist(s)	Vita Styopina	Ukraine	o	o	o	xxo	xxo	o	xxx			2.02	PB
4	Amy Acuff	United States	o	o	o	xo	o	-	xxx			1.99	
5	Iryna Mykhalchenko	Ukraine	o	o	o	xo	xxx					1.96	
6	Anna Chicherova	Russia	xo	o	o	xxo	xxx					1.96	
7	Oana Pantelimon	Romania	o	o	o	xxx						1.93	SB
8	Monica Iagăr	Romania	o	o	xo	xxx						1.93	
9	Inha Babakova	Ukraine	o	xo	xo	xxx						1.93	
10	Marta Mendía	Spain	o	o	xxo	xxx						1.93	
11	Blanka Vlašić	Croatia	o	o	xxx							1.89	
12	Tia Hellebaut	Belgium	o	xxx								1.85	
