= Bengt Jönsson (athletics coach) =

Swedish athletics coach

Bengt Jönsson (born August 29, 1958 in Klippan, Sweden) is a trainer in athletics. He trained world champion high jumper Kajsa Bergqvist in Turebergs FK for many years, and Jönsson influenced her to focus on high jump only.
