= Elena Herzenberg =

German high jumper

Elena Herzenberg (born 24 June 1979) is a retired German high jumper.

She finished fourth at the 2001 European U23 Championships and thirteenth at the 2001 World Indoor Championships. She also competed at the 2002 European Indoor Championships, the 2002 European Championships and the 2003 World Indoor Championships without reaching the final.

She became German champion in 2002 and German indoor champion in 2001 and 2003; here she also won silver medals in 1999 and 2002. She represented the club ABC Ludwigshafen.

Her personal best jump was 1.91 metres, achieved in May 2002 in Zweibrücken.
