= Diana Lázničková =

Slovak high jumper

Personal information
- Born: 14 August 1974 (age 51)

Sport
- Country: Slovakia
- Sport: Athletics
- Event: High jump

Diana Lázničková (born 14 August 1974) is a retired Slovak high jumper.

She competed at the 2002 European Indoor Championships and the 2005 European Indoor Championships without reaching the final.

She became Slovak champion in 2002, 2003, 2004 and 2005 and Slovak indoor champion in 2001, 2003, 2004, 2005 and 2008.

Her personal best jump was 1.87 metres, achieved in June 2001 in Bratislava. Indoors she managed 1.92 metres, in February 2005 in Bratislava.
