= Candeğer Kılınçer Oğuz =

Turkish high jumper (born 1980)

Personal information
- Nationality: Turkish
- Born: Kılınçer; 16 July 1980 (age 45)
- Height: 1.77 m (5.8 ft)
- Weight: 59 kg (130 lb)

Sport
- Country: Turkey
- Sport: Athletics
- Event: High jump
- Club: Enkaspor
- Coached by: Tayfun Aygün

Achievements and titles
- Personal best(s): outdoor: 1.93 m (2004) indoor:1.90 m (2002)
Medal record
Women's Athletics
Representing Turkey
European U23 Championships
Silver medal – second place	2001 Amsterdam	high jump

Candeğer Kılınçer Oğuz (née Kılınçer; born 16 July 1980) is a Turkish female high jumper.

She studied at Dokuz Eylül University. She is a member of Enkaspor. Her coach is Tayfun Aygün, who contributed to the establishment of a special school for high jump in 2005.

In 2002, she transferred from Beşiktaş J.K. Athletics Team to Fenerbahçe Athletics, before she finally entered Enkaspor. Candeğer Kılınçer Oğuz broke the national record in 2004 with 1.93 m.

She studied labor economics and industrial relations at the Dokuz Eylül University in İzmir. She is married to her former coach, Turkish-Cypriot sprinter Reşat Oğuz.

== Achievements ==
Year	Competition	Venue	Position	Notes
Representing Turkey
2001	European U23 Championships	Amsterdam, Netherlands	2nd	1.87 m
2001	Universiade	Beijing, China	8th	1.85 m
2001	Mediterranean Games	Radès, Tunisia	8th	1.79 m
2002	European Indoor Championships	Vienna, Austria	20th (q)	1.78 m
2002	European Championships	Munich, Germany	10th	1.78 m
2003	Universiade	Daegu, South Korea	4th	1.91 m
2004	Olympic Games	Athens, Greece	9th	1.89 m
2005	Mediterranean Games	Almería, Spain	5th	1.82 m
2005	Universiade	İzmir, Turkey	10th	1.80 m
2006	European Cup First League Group B	Thessaloniki, Greece	6th	1.80 m
