= Inha Babakova =

Ukrainian high jumper (born 1967)

Inha Alvidasivna Babakova
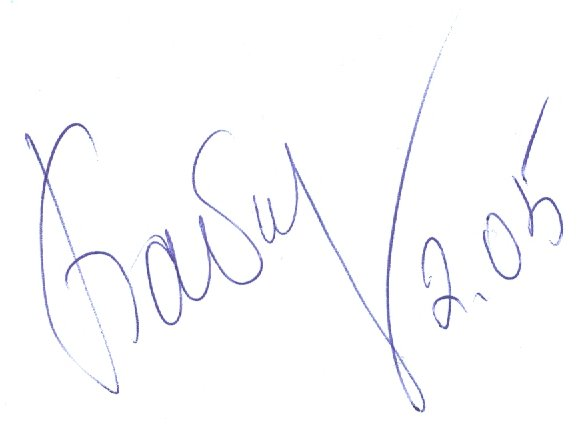

Personal information
- Full name: Інга Альвідасівна Бабакова
- Nationality: Ukraine
- Born: 26 June 1967 (age 59) Aşgabat, Turkmen SSR, Soviet Union
- Height: 1.80 m (5 ft 11 in)
- Weight: 60 kg (132 lb)

Sport
- Sport: Track and field
- Event: High jump

Achievements and titles
- Personal bests: High jump (outdoor): 2.05 m High jump (indoor): 2.00 m
Medal record
Women's athletics
Representing Soviet Union
World Championships
| Bronze medal – third place | 1991 Tokyo | High jump |
Representing Ukraine
Olympic Games
| Bronze medal – third place | 1996 Atlanta | High jump |
World Championships
| Gold medal – first place | 1999 Seville | High jump |
| Silver medal – second place | 1997 Athens | High jump |
| Silver medal – second place | 2001 Edmonton | High jump |
| Bronze medal – third place | 1995 Gothenburg | High jump |
World Indoor Championships
| Silver medal – second place | 1997 Paris | High Jump |
| Silver medal – second place | 2001 Lisbon | High Jump |
| Bronze medal – third place | 1993 Toronto | High Jump |
IAAF Grand Prix Final
| Gold medal – first place | 1995 Fontvielle | High jump |
| Gold medal – first place | 1997 Fukuoka | High jump |
| Silver medal – second place | 1999 Munich | High jump |
| Silver medal – second place | 2001 Melbourne | High jump |

Inha Babakova, née Inha Butkus, (Ukrainian: Інга Бабакова; born 26 June 1967) is a former Ukrainian high jumper who represented the Soviet Union and later Ukraine. She was born in Asgabat, Turkmen SSR. Her personal best is 2.05 metres.

== Career ==
Babakova won an Olympic bronze medal in Atlanta 1996 and became World Champion in Seville 1999. She also won four other World Championship medals, with bronzes in 1991 and 1995 and silvers in 1997 and 2001. Track and Field News magazine ranked her in the world's top ten in their annual merit rankings for 13 out of 14 seasons (1991–2004), the exception being 1998. She was in the top five ten times. Only Stefka Kostadinova, among other female high jumpers, has more top ten rankings. Her 2.01 m clearance in Oslo on her 36th birthday in 2003 is the women's W35 World Record.

== Achievements ==
| Year | Competition | Venue | Position | Notes |
Representing Soviet Union
| 1991 | World Championships | Tokyo, Japan | 3rd | 1.96 m |
Representing Ukraine
| 1993 | World Indoor Championships | Toronto, Canada | 3rd | 2.00 m |
| 1994 | European Championships | Helsinki, Finland | 4th | 1.93 m |
| 1995 | World Championships | Gothenburg, Sweden | 3rd | 1.99 m |
| 1996 | Olympic Games | Atlanta, United States | 3rd | 2.01 m |
| 1997 | World Indoor Championships | Paris, France | 2nd | 2.00 m |
| 1997 | World Championships | Athens, Greece | 2nd | 1.96 m |
| 1999 | World Championships | Seville, Spain | 1st | 1.99 m |
| 2000 | Olympic Games | Sydney, Australia | 5th | 1.96 m |
| 2001 | World Indoor Championships | Lisbon, Portugal | 2nd | 2.00 m |
| 2001 | World Championships | Edmonton, Canada | 2nd | 2.00 m |
| 2003 | World Indoor Championships | Birmingham, United Kingdom | 8th | 1.92 m |
| 2003 | World Championships | Paris, France | 15th q | 1.88 m |
| 2004 | Olympic Games | Athens, Greece | 9th | 1.93 m |

Note: Results with a q, indicate overall position in qualifying round.

== See also ==
- Female two metres club

Sporting positions
| Preceded by (Bulgaria) Stefka Kostadinova | Women's High Jump Best Year Performance; 1994 – 1995 | Succeeded by (Bulgaria) Stefka Kostadinova |
| Preceded by (Bulgaria) Stefka Kostadinova | Women's High Jump Best Year Performance alongside (Bulgaria) Stefka Kostadinova; 1997 | Succeeded by (Bulgaria) Venelina Veneva |
