= Nevena Lenđel =

Croatian high jumper (born 1979)

Personal information
- Born: 18 July 1979 (age 47)

Sport
- Sport: Track and field
Medal record
Representing Croatia
Mediterranean Games
Silver medal – second place	2001 Tunis	High jump
Summer Universiade
Bronze medal – third place	2001 Beijing	High jump

Nevena Lenđel (born 18 July 1979) is a retired Croatian high jumper.

She won the bronze medal at the 1998 World Junior Championships and the 2001 Summer Universiade. She also competed at the 1999 World Championships, the 2000 and 2002 European Indoor Championships and the 2002 European Championships without reaching the final.

Competing for the SMU Mustangs track and field team, Lenđel won the 2003 high jump at the NCAA Division I Indoor Track and Field Championships with a mark of 1.89 metres.

Her personal best jump was 1.91 metres, achieved in August 1999 in Gothenburg.

== Competition record ==
Year	Competition	Venue	Position	Notes
Representing Croatia
1995	European Junior Championships	Nyíregyháza, Hungary	12th	1.75 m
1996	World Junior Championships	Sydney, Australia	18th (q)	1.75 m
1997	Mediterranean Games	Bari, Italy	7th	1.84 m
1997	European Junior Championships	Ljubljana, Slovenia	7th	1.82 m
1998	World Junior Championships	Annecy, France	3rd	1.84 m
1999	European U23 Championships	Gothenburg, Sweden	4th	1.91 m
1999	World Championships	Seville, Spain	26th (q)	1.85 m
2000	European Indoor Championships	Ghent, Belgium	9th (q)	1.91 m
2001	European U23 Championships	Amsterdam, Netherlands	11th	1.78 m
2001	Universiade	Beijing, China	3rd	1.91 m
2001	Mediterranean Games	Radès, Tunisia	2nd	1.87 m
2002	European Indoor Championships	Vienna, Austria	26th (q)	1.79 m
2002	European Championships	Munich, Germany	13th (q)	1.87 m
