= Inna Gliznuta =

Moldovan high jumper

Personal information
- Born: 18 April 1973 (age 53) Bender, Soviet Union

Sport
- Sport: Track and field

Inna Gliznuta (born 18 April 1973) is a Moldovan high jumper. She has competed at four Olympic Games.

She finished second at the 1992 World Junior Championships in Seoul, fourteenth at the 1993 IAAF World Indoor Championships in Toronto, eighth at the 1994 European Indoor Championships in Paris and fourth at the 2001 Summer Universiade in Beijing. She also competed in four Olympics, but failed to qualify from her pool.

Her personal best jump is 1.95 metres, achieved in June 1999 in Tel Aviv.

== Achievements ==
Year	Competition	Venue	Position	Notes
Representing the Commonwealth of Independent States
1992	World Junior Championships	Seoul, South Korea	2nd	1.88 m
Representing Moldova
1993	World Indoor Championships	Toronto, Canada	14th	1.85 m
1994	European Indoor Championships	Paris, France	8th	1.90 m
1994	European Championships	Helsinki, Finland	17th (q)	1.90 m
1996	Olympic Games	Atlanta, United States	23rd (q)	1.85 m
1997	World Championships	Athens, Greece	21st (q)	1.80 m
1998	European Championships	Budapest, Hungary	23rd (q)	1.83 m
1999	World Championships	Seville, Spain	31st (q)	1.85 m
2000	Olympic Games	Sydney, Australia	23rd (q)	1.89 m
2001	Universiade	Beijing, China	4th	1.88 m
2002	European Indoor Championships	Vienna, Austria	14th (q)	1.89 m
2002	European Championships	Munich, Germany	17th (q)	1.87 m
2004	Olympic Games	Athens, Greece	26th (q)	1.85 m
2005	World Championships	Helsinki, Finland	21st (q)	1.84 m
2006	European Championships	Gothenburg, Sweden	20th (q)	1.87 m
2007	World Championships	Osaka, Japan	25th (q)	1.88 m
2008	Olympic Games	Beijing, PR China	29th (q)	1.80 m

Notes:

- Results in brackets indicate height achieved in qualifying round
- Results with a q indicate overall position in qualifying round
- At the 1992 World Juniors Gliznuta represented the Unified Team of the former Soviet Union.
