= Kathryn Holinski =

German high jumper

Kathryn Holinski (born 19 July 1982) is a retired German high jumper.

She finished seventh at the 2002 European Indoor Championships, third at the 2002 European Cup, fourth at the 2002 European Championships and sixth at the 2002 World Cup.

She won a silver medal at the German championships in 2002, became German indoor champion in 2002 and also won an indoor bronze in 2003. She represented the club LG Olympia Dortmund.

Her personal best jump was 1.93 metres, achieved at the 2002 European Cup in Annecy.
