= Dóra Győrffy =

Hungarian high jumper

Personal information
- Born: 23 February 1978 (age 48) Budapest, Hungary

Sport
- Sport: Track and field
Medal record
Representing Hungary
Summer Universiade
Gold medal – first place	2003 Daegu	High jump
European Indoor Championships
Silver medal – second place	2002 Vienna	High jump
World Junior Championships
Silver medal – second place	1996 Sydney	High jump

Dóra Győrffy (born 23 February 1978) is a Hungarian high jumper. She became Hungarian champion every year since 1996, except 2003, and NCAA champion for Harvard in 2001. Her personal best jump is 2.00 metres, achieved in July 2001 in Nyíregyháza. This is the Hungarian record.

== Achievements ==
Year	Competition	Venue	Position	Notes
Representing Hungary
1994	World Junior Championships	Lisbon, Portugal	7th	1.80 m
1995	European Junior Championships	Nyíregyháza, Hungary	5th	1.84 m
1996	World Junior Championships	Sydney, Australia	2nd	1.91 m
1997	World Indoor Championships	Paris, France	25th (q)	1.80 m
1997	European Junior Championships	Ljubljana, Slovenia	5th	1.88 m
1997	Universiade	Catania, Italy	10th	1.88 m
1998	European Championships	Budapest, Hungary	16th (q)	1.87 m
1999	Universiade	Palma de Mallorca, Spain	4th	1.91 m
1999	European U23 Championships	Gothenburg, Sweden	5th	1.88 m
2000	Olympic Games	Sydney, Australia	18th (q)	1.89 m
2001	World Indoor Championships	Lisbon, Portugal	5th	1.93 m
2001	World Championships	Edmonton, Canada	7th	1.90 m
2001	Goodwill Games	Brisbane, Australia	6th	1.89 m
2002	European Indoor Championships	Vienna, Austria	2nd	1.95 m
2002	European Championships	Munich, Germany	12th	1.80 m
2003	World Indoor Championships	Birmingham, United Kingdom	13th (q)	1.90 m
2003	Universiade	Daegu, South Korea	1st	1.94 m
2005	World Championships	Helsinki, Finland	9th	1.89 m
2006	European Championships	Gothenburg, Sweden	18th (q)	1.87 m
2007	World Championships	Osaka, Japan	20th (q)	1.88 m
