= Corinne Müller =

Swiss high jumper

Personal information
- Born: 20 November 1975 (age 50) Brugg, Switzerland

Sport
- Sport: Track and field

Corinne Müller (born 20 November 1975) is a retired Swiss athlete who specialised in the high jump. She represented her country at the 2004 Summer Olympics without reaching the final. Her indoor personal best of 1.92 metres is the Swiss national record for the event. She also occasionally competed in the long jump and triple jump.

== Competition record ==
Year	Competition	Venue	Position	Event	Notes
Representing Switzerland
1997	Universiade	Catania, Italy	13th (q)	High jump	1.85 m
2001	Universiade	Beijing, China	13th (q)	High jump	1.85 m
2003	Universiade	Daegu, South Korea	7th	High jump	1.85 m
2004	Olympic Games	Athens, Greece	23rd (q)	High jump	1.89 m
2005	European Indoor Championships	Madrid, Spain	11th (q)	High jump	1.88 m
2005	World Championships	Helsinki, Finland	14th (q)	High jump	1.91 m

== Personal bests ==
Outdoor

- High jump – 1.93 (Zug 2005)
- Long jump – 5.90 (+0.1 m/s) (Basel 2004)
- Triple jump – 12.87 (-0.4 m/s) (Basel 2004)

Indoor

- High jump – 1.92 (Magglingen 2005) NR
- Triple jump – 13.01 (Magglingen 2005)
