= Marina Kuptsova =

Russian high jumper (born 1981)

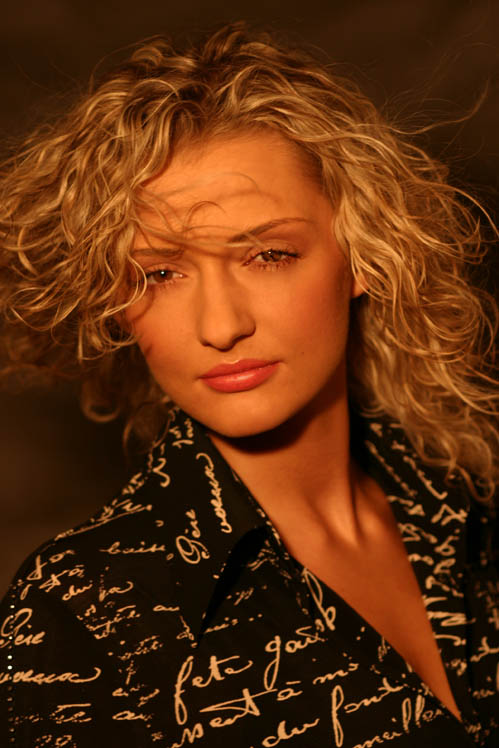
Marina Kuptsova

Marina Kuptsova (born December 22, 1981, in Moscow) is a Russian high jumper who won a silver medal at the 2003 World Championships. She is also a former European indoor high jump champion. Her personal best jump of 2.02 metres was achieved in Hengelo in June 2003, a year when she also won the national championship.

She set a personal best of 2.00 m to win the 2002 Hochsprung mit Musik, and returned the following year with a season's best of 2.02 m to score a second victory.

She missed 2004 because of an Achilles tendon injury and spent the 2005 season trying to return to her best but she only managed 1.92 metres, which, however, was enough for a second place in the Russian championships.

== International competitions ==
Representing Russia
Year	Competition	Venue	Position	Event	Result	Notes
1997	European Junior Championships	Ljubljana, Slovenia	2nd	High jump	1.90 m	
1998	World Junior Championships	Annecy, France	1st	High jump	1.88 m	
1999	European Junior Championships	Riga, Latvia	3rd	High jump	1.88 m	
2000	World Junior Championships	Santiago, Chile	2nd	High jump	1.88 m	
2000	European Indoor Championships	Sydney, Australia	26th (q)	High jump	1.85 m	
2001	European U23 Championships	Amsterdam, Netherlands	2nd	High jump	1.87 m	
2001	Universiade	Beijing, China	7th	High jump	1.88 m	
2002	European Indoor Championships	Vienna, Austria	1st	High jump	2.03 m	=NR
2002	European Championships	Munich, Germany	2nd	High jump	1.92 m	
2003	World Championships	Paris, France	2nd	High jump	2.00 m	
