= Lucie Finez =

French high jumper

Personal information
- Nationality: France
- Born: 25 November 1976 (age 49) Bouake (Ivory Coast)

Sport
- Event: High Jump

Achievements and titles
- Personal best: 1.90m

Lucie Finez (born 25 November 1976 in Bouake, Ivory Coast) is a former French athlete who practiced the high jump and who competed for l'Évreux Athlétic Club.

== Prize list ==
Records

1.90 m (personal best)

Performances

- (gold) in Championnats de France d'athlétisme 2001 Outdoors
- (gold) in Championnats de France d'athlétisme en salle 2004 Indoors
- Participation in the Seville World Athletic Championships in 1999 where she placed 12th with a jump of 1.85m.
