= Hanna Grobler =

Finnish high jumper (born 1981)

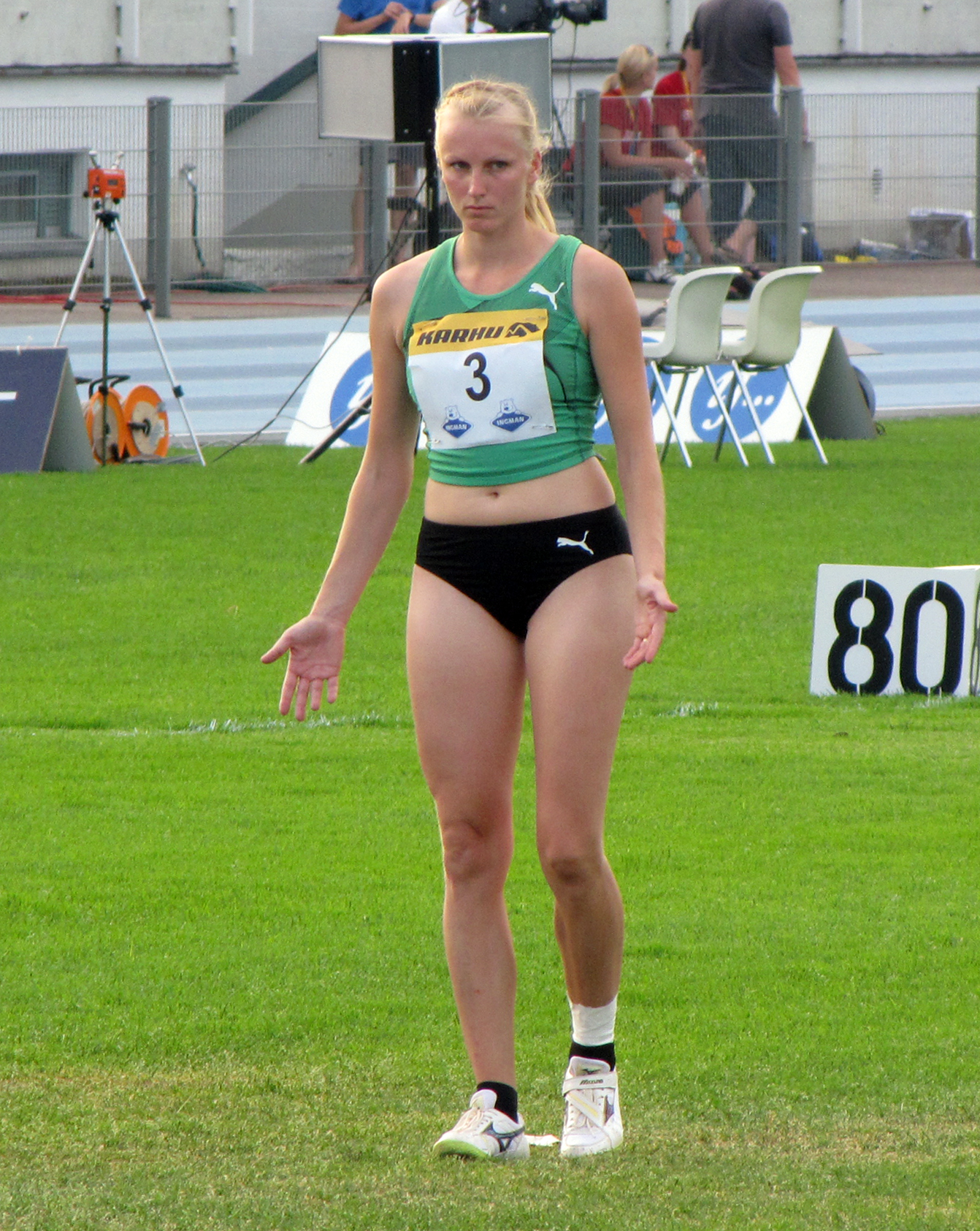

Hanna Emilia Grobler (née Mikkonen, born 15 January 1981 in Ruovesi) is a Finnish high jumper.

She competed at the World Championships in 2005 and in 2009 without reaching the final.

She has won nine gold medals in Finnish National Championships, which is the most of all high jumpers in Finland.

Her personal best vault is 1.92 metres (national record until 2016), achieved in June 2005 in Luna Tampere.

== Achievements ==
Year	Competition	Venue	Position	Notes
Representing Finland
1998	World Junior Championships	Annecy, France	15th (q)	1.78 m
2000	World Junior Championships	Santiago, Chile	15th (q)	1.80 m
2001	European U23 Championships	Amsterdam, Netherlands	5th	1.84 m
2003	European U23 Championships	Bydgoszcz, Poland	8th	1.87 m
2008	Finnish Championships	Tampere, Finland	1st	1.81 m
2009	Finnish Championships	Espoo, Finland	1st	1.87 m
