= Tatjana Kivimägi =

Russian-Estonian high jumper

Tatjana Kivimägi, (Russian: Татьяна Кивимяги, transliterated Tatyana Kivimyagi; born 23 June 1984) is a Russian-Estonian high jumper.

== Career ==
She finished fifth at the 2005 European Indoor Championships and sixth at the 2005 World Athletics Final. She competed at the 2004 Summer Olympics and the 2005 World Championships without reaching the finals.

Her personal best jump is 1.98 metres, achieved in August 2004 in Moscow and repeated in June 2005 in Florence, in January 2008 in Moscow (indoor) and in July 2008 in Kazan.

== Personal life ==
She was born as Tatyana Novoseltseva in Bryansk. She married her coach Mihhail Kivimägi, a retired Estonian decathlete. On 18 December 2008 the Government of Estonia granted to Tatjana Kivimägi Estonian citizenship for special merit. Due to Estonia not allowing dual-citizenship, and Kivimägi not wanting to give up Russian citizenship, she finally did not get Estonian citizenship. She later remarried and moved to Moscow.
