= Susan Moncrieff =

English high jumper (born 1978)

Personal information
- Nationality: British (English)
- Born: 8 June 1978 (age 48) Wigan, England

Sport
- Sport: Athletics
- Event: high jump
- Club: Trafford AC
Medal record
Representing England
Commonwealth Games
Silver medal – second place	2002 Manchester	High jump

Susan Eva Moncrieff, (née Jones, born 8 June 1978) is an English female retired high jumper.

== Biography ==
She finished sixth at the 1997 Summer Universiade, and sixth at the 1998 European Indoor Championships.

Also in 1998 she represented England in the high jump event, at the 1998 Commonwealth Games in Kuala Lumpur, Malaysia.

In 1999 she finished ninth at the 1999 European U23 Championships, tenth at the 1999 Summer Universiade,.

She then won the 2001 European Cup and competed at the 2001 World Championships, In 2002 she finished fifth at the 2002 European Indoor Championships but her finest achievement came was winning a silver medal at the 2002 Commonwealth Games. The same year she finished seventh at the 2002 European Championships.

After appearing in the 2003 World Indoor Championships and the 2005 European Indoor Championships she went to her third Commonwealth Games (under her married name) finishing sixth at the 2006 Commonwealth Games.

At the National Championships she became AAA champion in 2001, 2002, 2003, 2004 and 2005, as well as AAA indoor champion in 1998, 2001, 2002, 2003, 2004, 2005 and 2006.

Her personal best jump was 1.95 metres, achieved at the 2001 European Cup in Bremen. This was the joint British record until 2014.
