= Barbora Laláková =

Czech high jumper

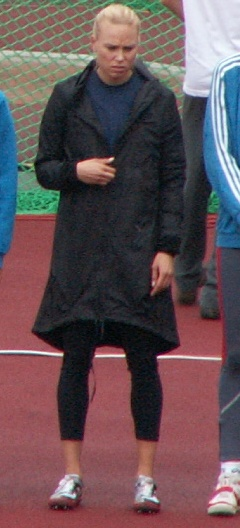
Laláková in 2009

Barbora Laláková (born 2 May 1981 in Brandýs nad Labem) is a Czech athlete specialising in the high jump. She reached the final of the 2007 World Championships finishing 15th.

Her outdoor personal best is 1.95 metres (2007). Her indoor personal best of 1.99 metres (2006) is the current national record.

== Competition record ==
Year	Competition	Venue	Position	Notes
Representing Czech Republic
1998	World Junior Championships	Annecy, France	24th (q)	1.70 m
1999	European Junior Championships	Riga, Latvia	7th	1.82 m
2000	World Junior Championships	Santiago, Chile	9th	1.80 m
2001	European U23 Championships	Amsterdam, Netherlands	8th	1.81 m
2003	European U23 Championships	Bydgoszcz, Poland	8th	1.87 m
2003	Universiade	Daegu, South Korea	9th	1.80 m
2006	World Indoor Championships	Moscow, Russia	11th (q)	1.90 m
2006	European Championships	Gothenburg, Sweden	16th (q)	1.87 m
2007	World Championships	Osaka, Japan	15th	1.90 m
2008	World Indoor Championships	Valencia, Spain	16th (q)	1.81 m
