= Erin Aldrich =

American high jumper and volleyball player (born 1977)

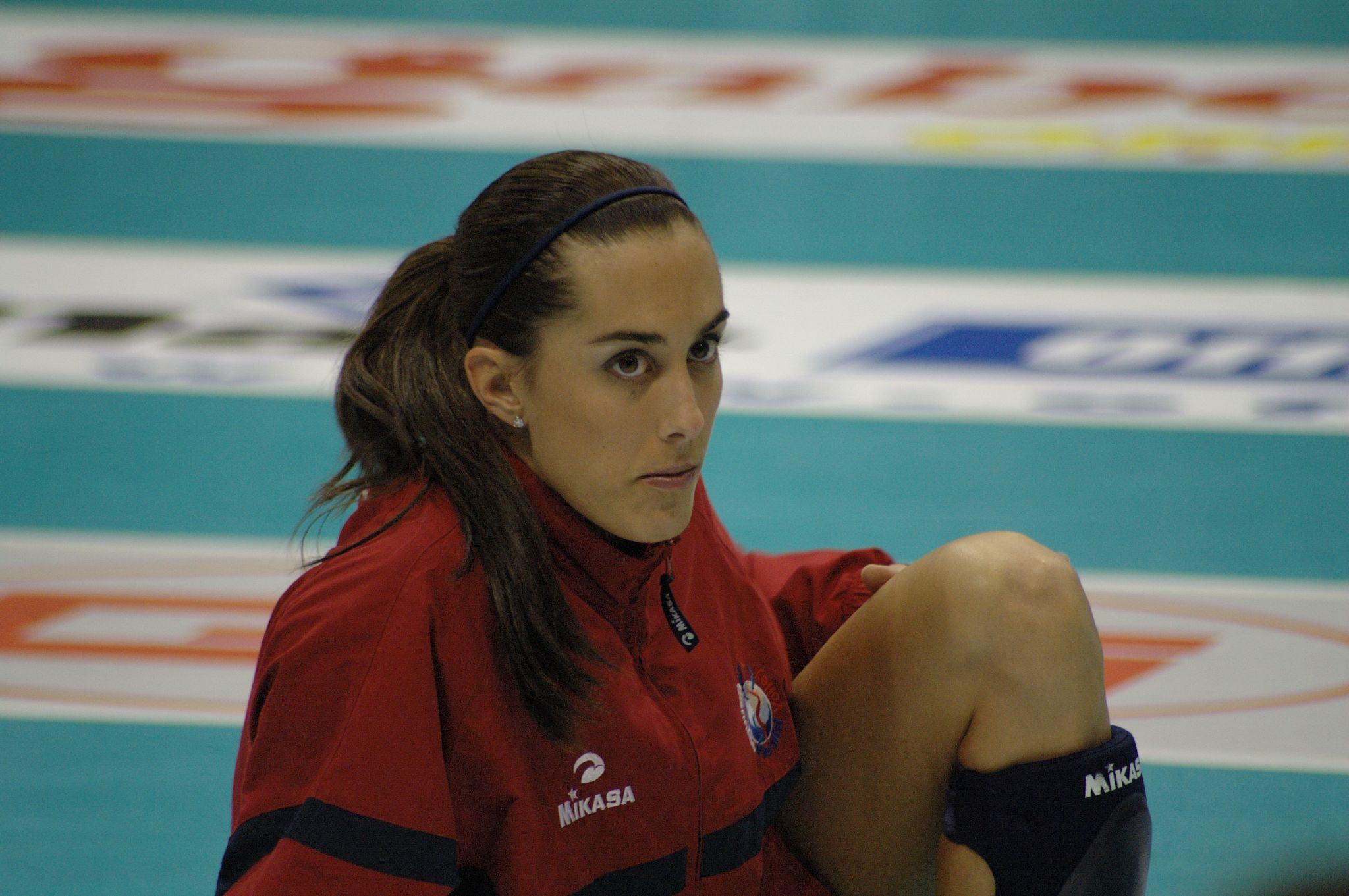
- Aldrich in 2006

Personal information
- Full name: Erin Marie Aldrich
- Born: December 27, 1977 (age 48) Dallas, Texas, U.S.

Sport
- Country: United States
- Sport: Athletics & Volleyball
Medal record
Women's volleyball
Representing the United States
Pan American Games
Bronze medal – third place	2003 Santo Domingo	Team

Erin Marie Shean (née Aldrich) (born December 27, 1977, in Dallas, Texas) is an American high jumper and volleyball player.

She competed at the 2000 Olympic Games, in high jump.

== College Career ==
After graduating from Lake Highlands High School where she was a High School All-American in Volleyball in 1995 and 1996, she became a two-sport NCAA athlete. She competed for the Arizona Wildcats in both volleyball and track during the 1996-97 NCAA season and transferred to Texas to compete in track from 1997 to 2000 and Volleyball in the 1989-99 seasons.

=== Track ===
She won four NCAA Championships and six Big 12 Championships in the high jump and was a 6-time All-American at Texas. In 1988 she won both the 1988 NCAA indoor and outdoor high jump titles and helped Texas win four consecutive NCAA indoor and outdoor Track and Field Championships from 1997 to 2000.

When she finished her career, she held 5 of the top 8 indoor jumps and 4 of the top 8 outdoor jumps in school history.

=== Volleyball ===
In 1989-99 Aldrich was a star on the Longhorns Volleyball team. In 1998, against Colorado she had 12 block assists, tied for 2nd most in school history at the time and the most in a five-set match, and then two weeks later, against Texas Tech, she had 13 block assists, which became the new 2nd most in a single game in school history. She also had 14 total blocks in each of those games - tied for 6th most in a single game in school history. That season she led the team in total blocks (181) (3rd most in school history) and set the school season-single record for block assists (157) and blocks per set (1.63) as they advanced to the 2nd round of the NCAA tournament. That season she made the All-Big 12 Team, the AVCA All-Region team and was named the Big 12 Newcomer of the Year.

In 1999 she led the nation in triple doubles (6) and led the Texas Longhorns in kills (470), hitting percentage (0.325) and total blocks again (174) (5th most in school history) and was named the team's MVP as they advanced to the NCAA Regional Finals where they lost to #1 Long Beach. Against Nebraska, she set the school's single game kills Record with 32. Against Baylor she had 15 total blocks, tied for 4th most in a single game in school history, and the most in a five-set match. She set the school record for single season kills per set (4.80) and points per set (5.98) and had the 3rd most single-season block assists (143) in school history and broke her own record for blocks per set (1.78). She made the and All-Big 12 team, Academic All-Big 12 team, AVCA All-Region team and was a Volleyball Magazine 3rd team All-American.

She finished her career with the most blocks per set (1.70), highest hitting percentage (0.329), most points per set (5.71) and 3rd highest kills per set ratio (4.13) in school history at the time.

In 2000, she was named the Big 12 Conference Female Athlete of the Year. She graduate from Texas with a bachelor of journalism.

In 2010 she was named to the University of Texas Hall of Honor.

In 2020, Aldrich filed a lawsuit against the NCAA, saying that she was sexually abused by Arizona and Texas coach John Rembao and was not protected by the organization.

== Professional Career ==
=== Track ===
Her high jump career included finishing fourth at the 2001 Summer Universiade. She also competed at the 2000 Olympic Games and the World Championships in 1997, 2001, 2005 and 2007 without reaching the final.

Her personal best jump is 1.97 metres (6 ft 6 in), first achieved in 1998 in Indianapolis, Indiana.

=== Volleyball ===
She played for the United States women's national volleyball team in 2002, 2003 (training) and 2006. From 2007 to 2008, she played for NEC Red Rockets.

== Achievements ==
All results regarding high jump.

Year	Competition	Venue	Position	Notes
Representing the United States
1996	World Junior Championships	Sydney, Australia	4th	1.88 m
1997	World Championships	Athens, Greece	22nd (q)	1.80 m
2000	Olympic Games	Sydney, Australia	26th (q)	1.85 m
2001	Universiade	Beijing, China	4th	1.88 m
2001	World Championships	Edmonton, Canada	—	NM
2005	World Championships	Helsinki, Finland	17th (q)	1.88 m
2007	World Championships	Osaka, Japan	24th (q)	1.88 m
