= Kajsa Bergqvist =

Swedish high jumper (born 1976)

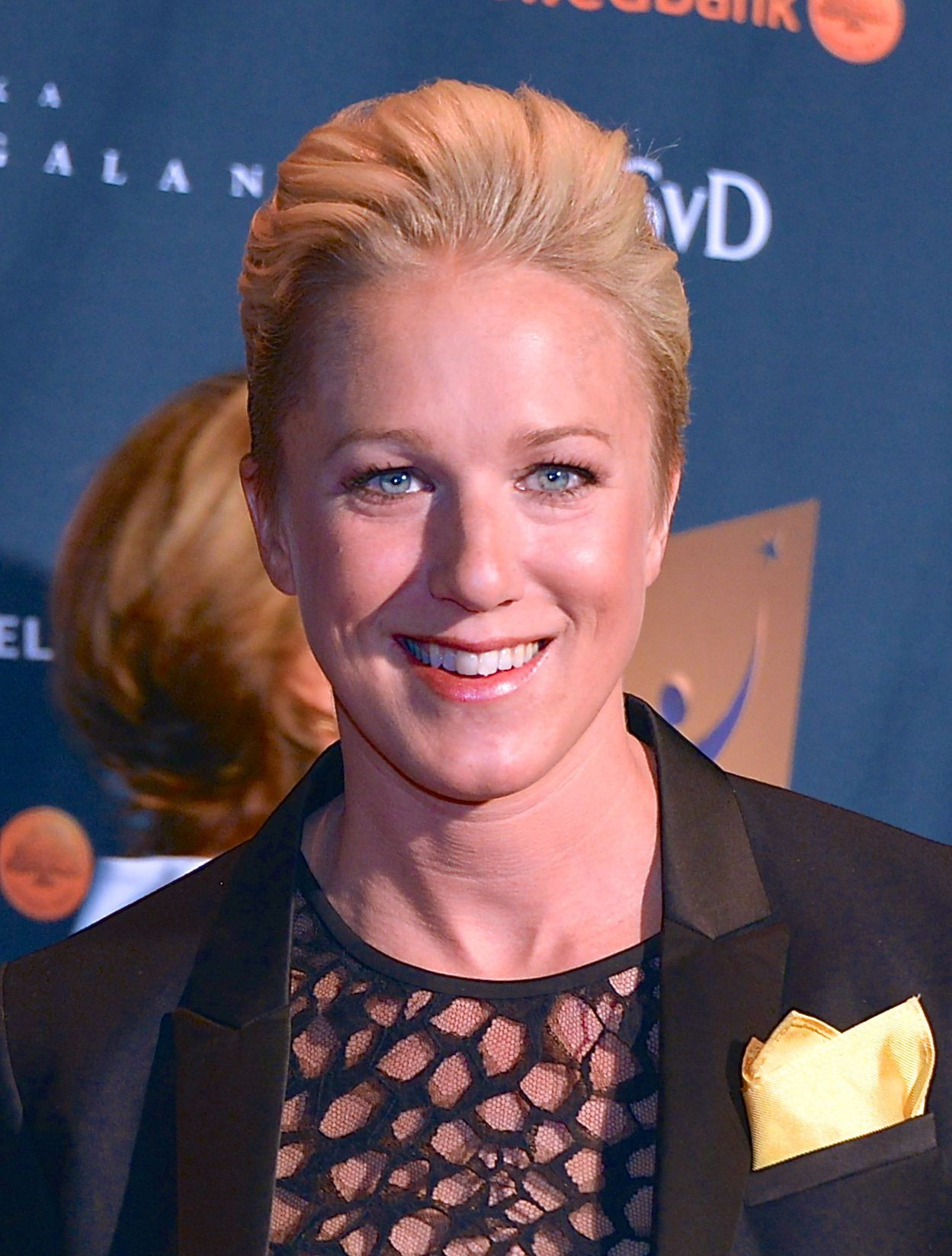
- Kajsa Bergqvist during the Swedish Sports Awards inside the Stockholm Globe Arena in January 2013

Personal information
- Full name: Kajsa Margareta Bergqvist
- Born: 12 October 1976 (age 49) Sollentuna Municipality, Stockholm County, Sweden
- Height: 1.75 m (5 ft 9 in)
- Weight: 59 kg (130 lb)

Sport
- Sport: Track and field
- Event: High jump
- Retired: 2007

Achievements and titles
- Personal bests: High jump (outdoor): 2.06 m High jump (indoor): 2.08 m (world record); Heptathlon: 4952 points
Medal record
Women's athletics
Representing Sweden
| Event | 1st | 2nd | 3rd |
|---|---|---|---|
| Olympic Games | 0 | 0 | 1 |
| World Championships | 1 | 0 | 2 |
| World Indoor Championships | 2 | 0 | 0 |
| European Championships | 1 | 0 | 1 |
| European Indoor Championships | 1 | 1 | 0 |
| Continental Cup | 0 | 0 | 0 |
| Total | 5 | 1 | 3 |
Olympic Games
| Bronze medal – third place | 2000 Sydney | High jump |
World Championships
| Gold medal – first place | 2005 Helsinki | High jump |
| Bronze medal – third place | 2001 Edmonton | High jump |
| Bronze medal – third place | 2003 Paris | High jump |
European Championships
| Gold medal – first place | 2002 Munich | High jump |
| Bronze medal – third place | 2006 Gothenburg | High jump |
World Indoor Championships
| Gold medal – first place | 2001 Lisbon | High jump |
| Gold medal – first place | 2003 Birmingham | High jump |
European Indoor Championships
| Gold medal – first place | 2000 Ghent | High jump |
| Silver medal – second place | 2002 Vienna | High jump |
World Athletics Final
| Gold medal – first place | 2005 Monte Carlo | High jump |
| Gold medal – first place | 2006 Stuttgart | High jump |
| Bronze medal – third place | 2003 Monte Carlo | High jump |
- Updated on 18 August 2013

Kajsa Margareta Bergqvist (Swedish pronunciation: [ˈkǎjːsa ˈbæ̂rjkvɪst]; born 12 October 1976 in Sollentuna, Stockholm) is a Swedish former high jumper. She won one bronze medal in the Olympic Games, one gold and two bronze medals in the World Championships in Athletics and one gold and one bronze in the European Championships. Her personal outdoor record of 2.06 m (6.8 ft), set in Germany in 2003, is also a Swedish record. Her indoor record of 2.08 m (6.8 ft), set at the Hochsprung mit Musik meeting in 2006, is the world indoor record.

== Early life ==
Bergqvist was born on 12 October 1976 in Sollentuna Municipality, Stockholm County.

When she was 10 years old, she was persuaded by her big brother, Anders, to compete in Rösjöloppet, a long-distance track event. After that event, she began to try out several athletic events. One of her motivational athletes was Carl Lewis.

Bergqvist continued to train in several athletic events until she was 15 years old, when a new coach, Bengt Jönsson, came to her club, Turebergs FK. Soon after his arrival, he and Bergqvist chose to concentrate on the event that was her best, high jump.

She attended Southern Methodist University in Dallas (USA) in 1995–1999, with a degree in advertising.

== Athletics career ==
Bergqvist was the NCAA champion in 1997 with a clearance of 1.93 m (6.3 ft) in the rain at the Indiana University over Amy Acuff of UCLA ending her streak at two. She won the NCAA meet again in 1999 with a height of 1.90 m (6.2 ft) in Boise. The same year, she tied Acuff's collegiate outdoor record of 1.98 m (6.5 ft).

In 2000, she cleared 2.00 m (6.56 ft) at the Swedish Olympic trials, tying for the year's second best record.

Bergqvist changed coaches from Bengt Jönsson to Yannick Tregaro in the autumn of 2003.

At a competition in Båstad, on 18 July 2004, Bergqvist tore her Achilles tendon. Due to the injury, she missed the 2004 Summer Olympics in Athens, but managed to return to form just in time for the 2005 World Championships in Athletics in Helsinki. There she edged out Chaunté Howard for the gold medal. Her Helsinki victory earned the Svenska Dagbladet Gold Medal.

In 2006, she had been ranked the number one female high jumper in the world but failed to win in that summer's European Championships in front of her home fans in Gothenburg, having to settle for a bronze medal.

At the Hochsprung mit Musik meeting in Arnstadt, Germany, on 4 February 2006, Bergqvist set her first world record: she made an indoor leap of 2.08 m (6.8 ft) on her first attempt, surpassing Heike Henkel's 2.07 m (6.8 ft) leap on 8 February 1992.

Bergqvist chose not to compete in the 2007 European Indoor Athletics Championships, opting instead, to concentrate on defending her world outdoor crown. She had not started the indoor season well and was nowhere near the form which had seen her set the world record the year before. It did not pay off as she finished 7th in Osaka.

She announced her retirement in January 2008.

== Post-athletics ==
Since her retirement, she has been an ambassador for both UNICEF and the IAAF.

In 2021 Bergqvist became head coach of the Swedish national athletics team.

== Personal life ==
Bergqvist married director Måns Herngren on New Year's Eve in 2007. The couple announced their divorce in early 2011.

In December 2011, Bergqvist confirmed in an interview that she is in a relationship with a woman and stated: "As lesbian as I feel today, as heterosexual I felt when I was together with Måns. But when I get old and look back on my life, perhaps one can think that I'm bisexual." This announcement came after a period of rumours concerning Bergqvist's personal life.

== International medals ==
=== High jump ===
- Olympic Games
  - 2000, Sydney – 1.99 m – Bronze
- World Championships in Athletics
  - 2005, Helsinki – 2.02 m – Gold
  - 2003, Paris – 2.00 m – Bronze
  - 2001, Edmonton – 1.97 m – Bronze
- World Indoor Championships in Athletics
  - 2003, Birmingham – 2.01 m – Gold
  - 2001, Lisbon – 2.00 m – Gold
- European Athletics Championships
  - 2006, Gothenburg – 2.01 m — Bronze
  - 2002, Munich – 1.98 m — Gold
- European Indoor Athletics Championships
  - 2002, Vienna – 1.95 m – Silver
  - 2000, Ghent – 2.00 m – Gold
- 1997, Turku – 1.93 m – Silver
- World Junior Championships in Athletics
  - 1994 Lisbon – 1.88 m – Silver
- European Athletics Junior Championships
  - 1995, Nyíregyháza – 1.89 m – Silver

== Other victories ==
=== High jump ===
- 1997: Bloomington, IN NCAA Women's Outdoor Track and Field Championship – 1.93 m
- 1999: Boise, ID NCAA Women's Outdoor Track and Field Championship – 1.90m
- 1999: Brussels (Golden League) – 1.97 m
- 2000: Stockholm (Grand Prix) – 1.96 m
- 2001: Vaasa (European Cup first league) – 1.92 m; Rome (Golden League) – 1.98 m; Monaco (Golden League) – 1.99 m; Berlin (Golden League) – 1.96 m
- 2002: Seville (European Cup first league) – 1.98 m; Lausanne (Grand Prix) – 2.04 m; Paris Saint-Denis (Golden League-meet) – 1.97 m; Stockholm (Grand Prix) – 2.00 m; Brussels (Golden League-meet) – 1.99 m
- 2003: Ostrava (Grand Prix) – 2.01 m; Lappeenranta (European Cup first league) – 1.96 m; Internationales Hochsprung-Meeting Eberstadt – 2.06 m (outdoor personal best)
- 2005: Gävle (European Cup first league) – 2.01 m; Zagreb (Grand Prix) – 2.00 m; Madrid (Grand Prix) – 1.98 m; Stockholm (Grand Prix) – 1.95 m; Sheffield (Grand Prix) – 2.03 m; Monaco (World Athletics Final) – 2.00 m
- 2006: Doha (Grand Prix) – 1.97 m; Málaga (European Cup super league) – 1.97 m; Athens (Grand Prix) – 2.00 m; Stockholm (Grand Prix) – 2.02 m; London (Grand Prix) – 2.05 m; Eberstadt (high jump-meet) – 1.98 m; Stuttgart (World Athletics Final) – 1.98 m
- 2007; Vaasa (European Cup first league) – 1.92 m; Sheffield (Grand Prix) – 1.95 m

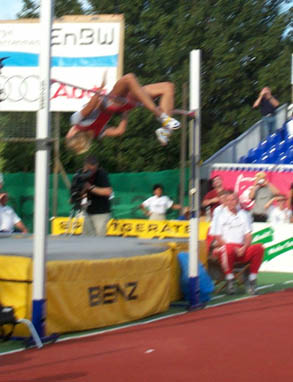
Kajsa Bergqvist's 2.06 m jump in Eberstadt 2003

Records
| Preceded by (West Germany) Heike Henkel | Women's High Jump Indoor World Record Holder; 4 February 2006 – present | Succeeded by Incumbent |
Awards
| Preceded by (Sweden) Stefan Holm | Svenska Dagbladet Gold Medal; 2005 | Succeeded by (Sweden) Anja Pärson |
Achievements
| Preceded by (Bulgaria) Venelina Veneva | Women's High Jump Best Year Performance; 2002–2003 | Succeeded by (Russia) Yelena Slesarenko |
| Preceded by (Russia) Yelena Slesarenko | Women's High Jump Best Year Performance; 2005–2006 | Succeeded by (Croatia) Blanka Vlašić |
| Preceded by (Sweden) Emelie Färdigh | Swedish National High Jump Champion; 1997–2003 | Succeeded by (Sweden) Carolina Klüft |
| Preceded by (Sweden) Emma Green | Swedish National High Jump Champion; 2006 | Succeeded by (Sweden) Emma Green |
