= Juana Arrendel =

Dominican Republic high jumper

Personal information
- Born: 16 June 1978 (age 48) La Romana, Dominican Republic

Sport
- Sport: Track and field
- Event: High jump
Medal record
Representing Dominican Republic
Pan American Games
Gold medal – first place	2003 Santo Domingo	High jump
Central American and Caribbean Games
Gold medal – first place	1998 Maracaibo	High jump
Gold medal – first place	2002 San Salvador	High jump
Gold medal – first place	2006 Cartagena	High jump

Juana Rosario Arrendel (born 16 June 1978) is a high jumper from the Dominican Republic.

Arrendel originally won the 1999 Pan American Games in Winnipeg, but lost the gold medal after testing positive for stanozolol. In 2006, she became the sixth woman to win three Central American and Caribbean Games titles in a row. The other are Miguelina Cobián, Carmen Romero, Bárbara Hechevarría, María Caridad Colón and Letitia Vriesde.

Arrendel personal best jump is 1.97 metres, achieved in December 2002 at the Central American and Caribbean Games in San Salvador. This is the current Dominican Republic record.

== Achievements ==
Year	Competition	Venue	Position	Notes
Representing the Dominican Republic
1998	Central American and Caribbean Games	Maracaibo, Venezuela	1st	1.90 m PB
1998	World Cup	Johannesburg, South Africa	8th	1.85 m
2002	NACAC U-25 Championships	San Antonio, United States	1st	1.95 m
2002	Central American and Caribbean Games	San Salvador, El Salvador	1st	1.97 m PB
2003	World Championships	Paris, France	8th	1.95 m SB
2003	Pan American Games	Santo Domingo, Dominican Republic	1st	1.94 m
2006	Central American and Caribbean Games	Cartagena, Colombia	1st	1.93 m SB
2007	Pan American Games	Rio de Janeiro, Brazil	6th	1.81 m

== See also ==
- List of doping cases in athletics
