= Francesca Bradamante =

Italian high jumper

Personal information
- Nationality: Italian
- Born: 26 April 1973 (age 53)

Sport
- Country: Italy
- Sport: Athletics
- Event: High jump

Achievements and titles
- Personal best: High jump: 6.01 m (1998)

Francesca Bradamante (born 26 April 1973) is a former Italian female high jumper.

== Biography ==
Bradamante won one national championships at senior level, her personal best 1.95 m, set in Udine 1998, is the 6th best Italian performance of all-time. In 1998 her measure was also the 10th world best performance of the year in the IAAF season's lists.

== National titles ==
- Italian Athletics Championships
  - High jump: 1998

== See also ==
- Italian all-time top lists - High jump
