= Vita Styopina =

Ukrainian high jumper (born 1976)

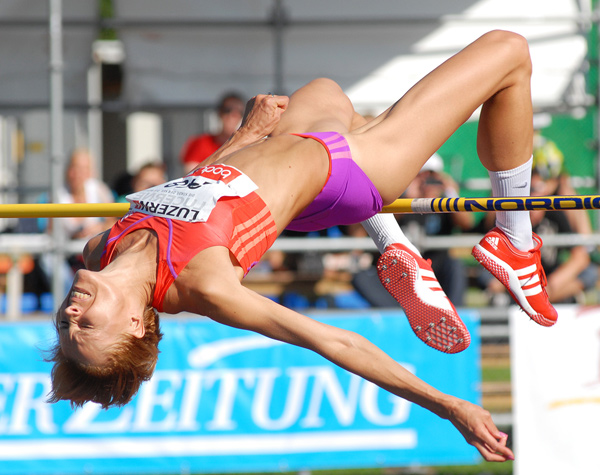
- Styopina at "Spitzen Leichtathletik Luzern" 2012

Personal information
- Full name: Viktoriya Ivanivna Styopina
- Born: 21 February 1976 (age 50) Zaporozhia, Soviet Union

Sport
- Event: High jump
Medal record
Women's athletics
Representing Ukraine
Summer Olympics
Bronze medal – third place	2004 Athens	High jump
European Team Championships
Silver medal – second place	2011 Stockholm	High jump
European Cup
Silver medal – second place	2008 Annecy	High jump
European Indoor Cup
Bronze medal – third place	2004 Leipzig	High jump
Military World Games
Silver medal – second place	1999 Zagreb	High jump
Bronze medal – third place	2007 Hyderabad	High jump
World Athletics Final
Silver medal – second place	2004 Monte Carlo	High jump
European Junior Championships
Gold medal – first place	1995 Nyíregyháza	High jump

Viktoriya Ivanivna Styopina (Ukrainian: Вікторія Іванівна Стьопіна; born 21 February 1976 in Zaporozhia, Soviet Union), known as Vita Styopina (Віта Стьопіна), is a Ukrainian high jumper.

== Biography ==
She won the bronze medal at the 2004 Summer Olympics, setting a new personal best of 2.02m in the process.

Styopina jumped an indoor personal best of 1.94 m to win the 2000 edition of the Hochsprung mit Musik.

== Achievements ==
- 2nd IAAF World Athletics Final — Silver medal
- 2004 Summer Olympics — Bronze medal

== See also ==
- Female two metres club
