= Venelina Veneva-Mateeva =

Bulgarian high jumper

Venelina Veneva-Mateeva (née Veneva, Bulgarian: Венелина Венева-Матеева, born June 13, 1974, in Ruse) is a Bulgarian high jumper.

== Biography ==
Talented at a young age, she jumped 1.93 metres indoor in 1990 to record a world best performance by a 15-year-old. She did not improve this result outdoor until 1995 (1.94 m). A disappointing 1996 season with a 29th place at the Olympic Games and 1.88 as season best was followed by a jump of 2.03 metres in 1998. In 2001, she managed 2.04 m, the ninth highest jump for a woman. That year she won a bronze medal at the World Indoor Championships, as well as placing fourth at the outdoor World Championships.

Veneva tested positive for testosterone in January 2007, and was subsequently suspended for two years by the IAAF.

== Achievements ==
| Year | Tournament | Venue | Result | Height |
|---|---|---|---|---|
| 1991 | European Junior Championships | Thessaloniki, Greece | 2nd | 1.91 metres |
| 1991 | World Championships | Tokyo, Japan | 22nd (q) | 1.79 m |
| 1995 | World Indoor Championships | Barcelona, Spain | =21st (q) | 1.85 m |
| 1995 | World Championships | Gothenburg, Sweden | 13th (q) | 1.93 m |
| 1996 | Olympic Games | Atlanta, United States | =29th (q) | 1.80 m |
| 1998 | European Championships | Budapest, Hungary | 5th | 1.98 m |
| 1999 | World Championships | Seville, Spain | =14th (q) | 1.89 m |
| 2000 | Olympic Games | Sydney, Australia | =9th | 1.93 m (1.94) |
| 2001 | World Indoor Championships | Lisbon, Portugal | 3rd | 1.96 m |
| 2001 | World Championships | Edmonton, Canada | 4th | 1.97 m |
| 2003 | World Championships | Paris, France | 4th | 1.98 m |
| 2004 | World Indoor Championships | Budapest, Hungary | 7th | 1.94 m (1.96) |
| 2004 | Olympic Games | Athens, Greece | 15th (q) | 1.92 m |
| 2005 | European Indoor Championships | Madrid, Spain | 3rd | 1.97 m |
| 2005 | World Championships | Helsinki, Finland | 10th | 1.85 m (1.91) |
| 2006 | European Championships | Gothenburg, Sweden | 2nd | 2.03 m |
| 2007 | European Indoor Championships | Birmingham, England | Disq (3rd) | 1.95 m |
| 2009 | World Championships | Berlin, Germany | 15th (q) | 1.92 m |
| 2011 | European Indoor Championships | Paris, France | 7th | 1.92 m |
| 2011 | World Championships | Daegu, South Korea | 21st (q) | 1.89 m |
| 2012 | European Championships | Helsinki, Finland | 12th | 1.80 m (1.90) |
| 2012 | Olympic Games | London, United Kingdom | =20th (q) | 1.85 m |
| 2014 | European Championships | Zürich, Switzerland | 16th (q) | 1.85 m |
| 2015 | European Indoor Championships | Prague, Czech Republic | 7th | 1.90 m |
| 2015 | World Championships | Beijing, China | 28th (q) | 1.80 m |

Notes:

- (q) Indicates overall position in qualifying round.
- (#) Indicates height achieved in qualifying round. Only shown when superior to result in final.
- (3rd) Originally won the bronze medal at 2007 European Indoor Championships before being disqualified for a doping offence.

== See also ==
- Female two metres club
- List of sportspeople sanctioned for doping offences

Sporting positions
| Preceded by (Bulgaria) Stefka Kostadinova (Ukraine) Inga Babakova | Women's High Jump Best Year Performance; 1998 | Succeeded by (South Africa) Hestrie Cloete |
| Preceded by (Romania) Monica Iagăr | Women's High Jump Best Year Performance; 2001 | Succeeded by (Sweden) Kajsa Bergqvist |
| Preceded by (Bulgaria) Eleonora Milusheva | Women's Bulgarian National Champion; 1995 | Succeeded by (Bulgaria) Stefka Kostadinova |
| Preceded by (Bulgaria) Maria Nikolova | Women's Bulgarian National Champion; 2004 | Succeeded by (Bulgaria) Elena Denkova |
