= Kärt Siilats =

Estonian athletics competitor

Personal information
- Born: 7 September 1980 (age 46) Tallinn, Estonia

Sport
- Sport: Track and field

Kärt Siilats (born 7 September 1980) is an Estonian high jumper.

== Early life and career ==
She was born in Tallinn. In 2002 she graduated from Harvard University (USA) in psychology.

She began athletics training in 1990, coached by Anu Samarüütel. Since 1997 her coach was Sven Andresoo. She has participated at World Championships in Athletics. In 2001 she become university champion in USA. She is multiple-times Estonian champion in high jump. 1998–2004 she was a member of Estonian national athletics team.

Since 2004, she is living in London.

In 1999 she was named as Best Female Athletics Competitor of Estonia.
