= Oana Pantelimon =

Romanian high jumper

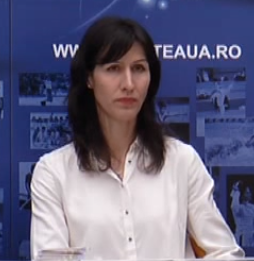

Personal information
- Born: 27 September 1972 (age 53) Tecuci, Romania

Sport
- Sport: Track and field
Medal record
Representing Romania
Olympic Games
Bronze medal – third place	2000 Sydney	High jump

Oana Manuela Pantelimon, née Musunoiu (born 27 September 1972) is a Romanian high jumper.

At the 2000 Olympic Games Pantelimon ended in third place, tied with Kajsa Bergqvist of Sweden. As the two athletes had an identical jumping record, with perfect attempts up to 1.99 where both had one foul, they shared the bronze medal. Pantelimon, who had no international honors before this competition, even jumped a personal best of 1.99 metres, improving her old mark by 5 centimetres.

Pantelimon did not win any further titles after the 2000 Olympics. She finished ninth at the 2001 World Championships, eighth at the 2002 European Indoor Championships, fourth at the 2002 European Championships, ninth at the 2003 World Indoor Championships, seventh at the 2004 Olympic Games and ninth at the 2005 European Indoor Championships. She also competed at the World Championships in 2003 and 2005 without qualifying for the final round. A 1.95 m jump from 2005 was her best post-2000 mark.
