= 2002 European Athletics Indoor Championships =

- Dates: 1–3 March
- Host city: Vienna, Austria
- Events: 28
- Participation: 558 athletes from 45 nations

The 2002 European Athletics Indoor Championships were held from Friday, 1 March to Sunday, 3 March 2002 in Vienna, the capital city of Austria. This was the last edition to be held in an even year to avoid it occurring in the same year as the outdoor European Athletics Championships.

== Results ==
=== Men ===
Games	Gold		Silver		Bronze	
60 m	(United Kingdom) Jason Gardener (GBR)	6.49 =CR	(United Kingdom) Mark Lewis-Francis (GBR)	6.55	(Ukraine) Anatoliy Dovhal (UKR)	6.62
200 m	(Poland) Marcin Urbaś (POL)	20.64	(United Kingdom) Christian Malcolm (GBR)	20.65	(Poland) Robert Maćkowiak (POL)	20.77
400 m	(Poland) Marek Plawgo (POL)	45.39; CR, NR	(Sweden) Jimisola Laursen (SWE)	45.59; NR	(Romania) Ioan Vieru (ROM)	46.17
800 m	(Poland) Paweł Czapiewski (POL)	1:44.78; CR, NR	(Switzerland) André Bucher (SUI)	1:44.93; NR	(Spain) Antonio Manuel Reina (ESP)	1:45.25; NR
1500 m	(Portugal) Rui Silva (POR)	3:49.93	(Spain) Juan Carlos Higuero (ESP)	3:50.08	(United Kingdom) Michael East (GBR)	3:50.52
3000 m	(Spain) Alberto García (ESP)	7:43.89; CR	(Spain) Antonio David Jiménez (ESP)	7:46.49	(Spain) Jesús España (ESP) (United Kingdom) John Mayock (GBR)	7:48.08
60 m hurdles	(United Kingdom) Colin Jackson (GBR)	7.40	(Austria) Elmar Lichtenegger (AUT)	7.44; NR	(Latvia) Staņislavs Olijars (LAT)	7.51
4 × 400 m relay	Poland; Marek Plawgo; Piotr Rysiukiewicz; Artur Gąsiewski; Robert Maćkowiak	3:05.50; CR	France; Marc Foucan; Laurent Claudel; Loic Lerouge; Stéphane Diagana	3:06.42	Spain; Carlos Meléndez; David Canal; Salvador Rodríguez; Alberto Martínez	3:06.60; NR
High jump	(Sweden) Staffan Strand (SWE)	2.34 m	(Sweden) Stefan Holm (SWE)	2.30 m	(Russia) Yaroslav Rybakov (RUS)	2.30 m
Pole vault	(Germany) Tim Lobinger (GER)	5.75 m	(Sweden) Patrik Kristiansson (SWE)	5.75 m NR	(Germany) Lars Börgeling (GER)	5.75 m
Long jump	(Spain) Raúl Fernández (ESP)	8.22 m	(Spain) Yago Lamela (ESP)	8.17 m	(Bulgaria) Petar Dachev (BUL)	8.17 m
Triple jump	(Sweden) Christian Olsson (SWE)	17.54 m =CR	(Romania) Marian Oprea (ROM)	17.22 m	(Belarus) Aleksandr Glavatskiy (BLR)	17.05 m
Shot put	(Spain) Manuel Martínez (ESP)	21.26 m NR	(Denmark) Joachim Olsen (DEN)	21.23 m	(Russia) Pavel Chumachenko (RUS)	20.30 m
Heptathlon	(Czech Republic) Roman Šebrle (CZE)	6280 pts	(Czech Republic) Tomáš Dvořák (CZE)	6165 pts	(Estonia) Erki Nool (EST)	6084 pts

=== Women ===
Games	Gold		Silver		Bronze	
60 m	Kim Gevaert (BEL)	7.16 =NR	Marina Kislova (RUS)	7.18	Georgia Kokloni (GRE)	7.22
200 m	Muriel Hurtis (FRA)	22.52	Karin Mayr (AUT)	22.70; NR	Gabi Rockmeier (GER)	23.05
400 m	Natalya Antyukh (RUS)	51.65	Claudia Marx (GER)	52.15	Karen Shinkins (IRL)	52.17
800 m	Jolanda Čeplak (SLO)	1:55.82; WR	Stephanie Graf (AUT)	1:55.85; NR	Elisabeth Grousselle (FRA)	2:01.46
1500 m	Yekaterina Puzanova (RUS)	4:06.30	Elena Iagăr (ROM)	4:06.90	Alesia Turava (BLR)	4:07.69
3000 m	Marta Domínguez (ESP)	8:53.87	Carla Sacramento (POR)	8:53.96	Yelena Zadorozhnaya (RUS)	8:58.36
60 m hurdles	Linda Ferga (FRA)	7.96	Kirsten Bolm (GER)	7.97	Patricia Girard (FRA)	7.98
4 × 400 m	Belarus; Yekaterina Stankevich; Iryna Khliustava; Hanna Kasak; Sviatlana Usovich	3:32.24	Poland; Anna Pacholak; Aneta Lemiesz; Anna Zagórska; Grażyna Prokopek	3:32.45	Italy; Daniela Reina; Patrizia Spuri; Carla Barbarino; Danielle Perpoli	3:36.49
High jump	Marina Kuptsova (RUS)	2.03 m =NR	Dóra Győrffy (HUN); Kajsa Bergqvist (SWE)	1.95 m		
Pole vault	Svetlana Feofanova (RUS)	4.75 m WR	Yvonne Buschbaum (GER)	4.65 m NR	Monika Pyrek (POL)	4.60 m NR
Long jump	Niki Xanthou (GRE)	6.74 m	Olga Rublyova (RUS)	6.74 m	Lyudmila Galkina (RUS)	6.68 m
Triple jump	Tereza Marinova (BUL)	14.71 m	Ashia Hansen (GBR)	14.71 m	Yelena Oleynikova (RUS)	14.30 m
Shot put	Vita Pavlysh (UKR)	19.76 m	Assunta Legnante (ITA)	18.60 m	Lieja Koeman (NED)	18.53 m
Pentathlon	Yelena Prokhorova (RUS)	4622 pts	Naide Gomes (POR)	4595 pts	Carolina Klüft (SWE)	4535 pts

== Medal table ==
Rank	Nation	Gold	Silver	Bronze	Total
1	Russia (RUS)	5	2	4	11
2	Spain (ESP)	4	3	3	10
3	Poland (POL)	4	1	2	7
4	Sweden (SWE)	2	4	1	7
5	Great Britain (GBR)	2	3	2	7
6	France (FRA)	2	1	1	4
7	Germany (GER)	1	3	2	6
8	Portugal (POR)	1	2	0	3
9	Czech Republic (CZE)	1	1	0	2
10	Belarus (BLR)	1	0	2	3
10	Ukraine (UKR)	1	0	2	3
12	Bulgaria (BUL)	1	0	1	2
12	Greece (GRE)	1	0	1	2
14	Belgium (BEL)	1	0	0	1
14	Slovenia (SLO)	1	0	0	1
16	Austria (AUT)	0	3	0	3
17	Romania (ROM)	0	2	1	3
18	Italy (ITA)	0	1	1	2
19	Denmark (DEN)	0	1	0	1
19	Hungary (HUN)	0	1	0	1
19	Switzerland (SUI)	0	1	0	1
22	Estonia (EST)	0	0	1	1
22	Ireland (IRL)	0	0	1	1
22	Latvia (LAT)	0	0	1	1
22	Netherlands (NED)	0	0	1	1
Totals (25 entries)		28	29	27	84

== Participating nations ==
- Albania (3)
- Andorra (2)
- Armenia (1)
- Austria (33)
- Azerbaijan (2)
- Belarus (12)
- Belgium (10)
- Bosnia and Herzegovina (2)
- Bulgaria (12)
- Croatia (8)
- Cyprus (8)
- Czech Republic (24)
- Denmark (5)
- Estonia (5)
- Finland (9)
- France (41)
- Georgia (1)
- Germany (27)
- Great Britain (21)
- Greece (17)
- Hungary (17)
- Iceland (2)
- Ireland (14)
- Israel (4)
- Italy (28)
- Latvia (4)
- Lithuania (3)
- Luxembourg (1)
- Malta (3)
- Moldova (2)
- Netherlands (12)
- Norway (4)
- Poland (24)
- Portugal (18)
- Romania (12)
- Russia (56)
- San Marino (1)
- Slovakia (10)
- Slovenia (21)
- Spain (35)
- Sweden (16)
- Switzerland (6)
- Turkey (7)
- Ukraine (11)
- Yugoslavia (4)
