= List of high jump national champions (women) =

Below a list of all national champions in the women's high jump event in track and field from several countries.

== Australia ==
- 1970: Carolyn Wright
- 1971: Carolyn Wright
- 1972: Raylene Parke
- 1973: Carolyn Lewis
- 1974: Raylene Parke
- 1975: Raylene Parke
- 1976: Christine Annison
- 1977: Christine Annison
- 1978: Katrina Gibbs
- 1979: Vanessa Browne
- 1980: Christine Stanton
- 1981: Christine Stanton
- 1982: Katrina Gibbs
- 1983: Christine Stanton
- 1984: Vanessa Browne
- 1985: Christine Stanton
- 1986: Christine Stanton
- 1987: Christine Stanton
- 1988: Vanessa Browne
- 1989: Vanessa Ward
- 1990: Vanessa Ward
- 1991: Alison Inverarity
- 1992: Tania Murray (NZL)
- 1993: Alison Inverarity
- 1994: Alison Inverarity
- 1995: Alison Inverarity
- 1996: Lea Haggett (GBR)
- 1997: Alison Inverarity
- 1998: Alison Inverarity
- 1999: Alison Inverarity
- 2000: Alison Inverarity
- 2001: Carmen Hunter
- 2002: Petrina Price
- 2003: Miyuki Aoyama (JPN)
- 2004: Petrina Price
- 2005: Sophia Begg
- 2006: Ellen Pettitt
- 2007: Ellen Pettitt
- 2008: Catherine Drummond
- 2009: Petrina Price

== Belarus ==
- 1992: Tatyana Shevchik
- 1993: Galina Isachenko
- 1994: Tatyana Shevchik
- 1995: Tatyana Gulevich
- 1996: Tatyana Khramova
- 1997: Tatyana Khramova
- 1998: Tatyana Gulevich
- 1999: Tatyana Gulevich
- 2000: Tatyana Shevchik
- 2001: Tatyana Gulevich
- 2002: Tatyana Gulevich
- 2003: Olga Klimova
- 2004: Olga Chuprova
- 2005: Irina Chuyko
- 2006: Alesya Gerasimova

== Belgium ==
- 1951: Jozefa Dierick
- 1952: Jozefa Dierick
- 1953: Jozefa Dierick
- 1954: Olga De Ceuster
- 1955: Jenny Van Gerdinge
- 1956: Marie-Louise Couwels
- 1957: Lieve Brijs
- 1958: Lea Van Hoogendorp
- 1959: Lea Van Hoogendorp
- 1960: Lieve Brijs
- 1961: Jeannine Knaepen
- 1962: Lieve Brijs
- 1963: Ghislaine De Pauw
- 1964: Anita Van de Aa
- 1965: Rita Van Herck
- 1966: Rita Van Herck
- 1967: Rita Van Herck
- 1968: Rita Van Herck
- 1969: Helga Deprez
- 1970: Rita Van Herck
- 1971: Roswitha Emonts-Gast
- 1972: Hilde Van Dijck
- 1973: Hilde Van Dijck
- 1974: Chris Van Landschoot
- 1975: Hilde Van Dijck
- 1976: Anne-Marie Pira
- 1977: Anne-Marie Pira
- 1978: Anne-Marie Pira
- 1979: Christine Soetewey
- 1980: Christine Soetewey
- 1981: Françoise Van Poelvoorde
- 1982: Christine Soetewey
- 1983: Christine Soetewey
- 1984: Christine Soetewey
- 1985: Christine Soetewey
- 1986: Christine Soetewey
- 1987: Christine Soetewey
- 1988: Natalja Jonckheere
- 1989: Sabine De Wachter
- 1990: May Verheyen
- 1991: Natalja Jonckheere
- 1992: Sabrina De Leeuw
- 1993: Sabrina De Leeuw
- 1994: Natalja Jonckheere
- 1995: Natalja Jonckheere
- 1996: Sabrina De Leeuw
- 1997: Sabrina De Leeuw
- 1998: Heidi Paesen
- 1999: Sabrina De Leeuw
- 2000: Tia Hellebaut
- 2001: Sabrina De Leeuw
- 2002: Tia Hellebaut
- 2003: Tia Hellebaut
- 2004: Sabrina De Leeuw
- 2005: Tia Hellebaut
- 2006: Sabrina De Leeuw
- 2007: Sabrina De Leeuw
- 2008: Sabrina De Leeuw
- 2009: Hanne Van Hessche
- 2010: Hannelore Desmet
- 2011: Hanne Van Hessche
- 2012: Hannelore Desmet
- 2013: Hanne Van Hessche
- 2014: Claire Orcel
- 2015: Claire Orcel
- 2016: Hanne Van Hessche

== Bulgaria ==
- 1970: Katya Lazova
- 1971: Katya Lazova
- 1972: Yordanka Blagoeva
- 1973: Yordanka Blagoeva
- 1974: Stanka Valkanova
- 1975: Yordanka Blagoeva
- 1976: Stanka Valkanova
- 1977: Yordanka Blagoeva
- 1978: Tatyana Kamareva
- 1979: Yordanka Blagoeva
- 1980: Yordanka Blagoeva
- 1981: Lyudmila Andonova
- 1982: Lyudmila Andonova
- 1983: Silvia Koeva
- 1984: Lyudmila Andonova
- 1985: Stefka Kostadinova
- 1986: Stefka Kostadinova
- 1987: Stefka Kostadinova
- 1988: Stefka Kostadinova
- 1989: Rosanel Gogi
- 1990: Svetlana Leseva
- 1991: Stefka Kostadinova
- 1992: Lyudmila Andonova
- 1993: Eleonora Milusheva
- 1994: Eleonora Milusheva
- 1995: Venelina Veneva
- 1996: Stefka Kostadinova
- 1997: Khristina Kalcheva
- 1998: Khristina Kalcheva
- 1999: Eleonora Milusheva
- 2000: Eleonora Milusheva
- 2001: Eleonora Milusheva
- 2002: Eleonora Milusheva
- 2003: Maria Nikolova
- 2004: Venelina Veneva
- 2005: Elena Denkova
- 2006: Maria Nikolova
- 2007: Mirela Demireva
- 2008: Mirela Demireva
- 2009: Venelina Veneva-Mateeva
- 2010: Venelina Veneva-Mateeva
- 2011: Mirela Demireva
- 2012: Gergana Mincheva
- 2013: Mirela Demireva
- 2014: Mirela Demireva
- 2015: Galina Nikolova
- 2016: Elena Petrova
- 2017: Elena Petrova
- 2018: Venelina Veneva-Mateeva
- 2019: Eleonora Dragieva

== Canada ==
- 1970: Debbie Brill
- 1971: Debbie Brill
- 1972: Louise Hanna
- 1973: Louise Hanna
- 1974: Debbie Brill
- 1975: Louise Walker
- 1976: Debbie Brill
- 1977: Maggie Woods
- 1978: Debbie Brill
- 1979: Brigitte Reid
- 1980: Debbie Brill
- 1981: Scarlet Vanden Bos
- 1982: Debbie Brill
- 1983: Debbie Brill
- 1984: Debbie Brill
- 1985: Jeannie Cockroft
- 1986: Shari Orders
- 1987: Leslie Estwick
- 1988: Linda Cameron
- 1989: Leslie Estwick
- 1990: Roberta Thoen
- 1991: Leslie Estwick
- 1992: Nathalie Belfort
- 1993: Wanita Dykstra
- 1994: Sara McGladdery
- 1995: Sara McGladdery
- 1996: Christina Livingston
- 1997: Christina Livingston
- 1998: Nicole Forrester
- 1999: Nicole Forrester
- 2000: Wanita May
- 2001: Wanita May
- 2002: Nicole Forrester
- 2003: Wanita May
- 2004: Wanita May
- 2005: Whitney Evans
- 2006: Nicole Forrester
- 2007: Nicole Forrester
- 2008: Nicole Forrester
- 2009: Jillian Drouin
- 2010:
- 2011: Jillian Drouin
- 2012: Nicole Forrester
- 2013: Michelle Kinsella
- 2014: Alyxandria Treasure
- 2015: Alyxandria Treasure
- 2016: Alyxandria Treasure
- 2017: Alyxandria Treasure
- 2018: Alyxandria Treasure
- 2019: Emma Kimoto

== China ==
- 1988: Jin Ling
- 1989: Wang Hui
- 1990: Zhang Tong
- 1991: Fu Xiuhong
- 1992: Wang Wei
- 1993: Ge Ping
- 1994: Guan Weihua
- 1995: Liu Yen
- 1996: Wang Wei
- 1997: Wang Wei
- 1998: Jin Ling
- 1999: Jing Xuezhu
- 2000: Zhang Liwen
- 2001: Jing Xuezhu
- 2002: Lu Jieming
- 2003: Jing Xuezhu
- 2004: Jing Xuezhu
- 2005: Jing Xuezhu

== Denmark ==
- 1980: Dorthe A. Rasmussen
- 1981: Dorthe A. Rasmussen
- 1982: Dorthe A. Rasmussen
- 1983: Lone Pleth Sørensen
- 1984: Lene Demsitz
- 1985: Lene Demsitz
- 1986: Birgitte Kristensen
- 1987: Dorthe Wolfsberg (Rasmussen)
- 1988: Dorthe Wolfsberg (Rasmussen)
- 1989: Lone Pleth Sørensen
- 1990: Lone Pleth Sørensen
- 1991: Charlotte Beiter
- 1992: Pia Zinck
- 1993: Pia Zinck
- 1994: Pia Zinck
- 1995: Pia Zinck
- 1996: Pia Zinck
- 1997: Pia Zinck
- 1998: Pia Zinck
- 1999: Karina Johansen
- 2000: Kathrine Nielsen
- 2001: Kathrine Nielsen
- 2002: Kathrine Nielsen
- 2003: Donata Jancewicz
- 2004: Donata Jancewicz
- 2005: Signe Vest
- 2006: Kathrine Nielsen
- 2007: Anne Møller

== Estonia ==
- 1923: Rosine Peek
- 1924: Olga Rebane
- 1925: Lydia Tippo
- 1926: Antonia Kroon
- 1927: Ludmilla Einstein
- 1928: Magda Tomasson
- 1929: Gertrud Schiefner
- 1930: Lydia Raudsepp
- 1931: Lydia Raudsepp
- 1932: Olga Arras
- 1933: Olga Arras
- 1934: Lydia Raudsepp
- 1935: Lydia Erikson
- 1936: Olga Arras
- 1937: Olga Arras
- 1938: Olga Arras
- 1939: Leida Hiiepuu
- 1940: Olga Arras
- 1941: -
- 1942: Olga Usar
- 1943: Olga Usar
- 1944: Aino Unt
- 1945: Leida Hiiepuu
- 1946: Olga Usar
- 1947: Olga Usar
- 1948: Olga Usar
- 1949: Juta Raudsepp
- 1950: Aino Huimerind
- 1951: Juta Raudsepp
- 1952: Juta Raudsepp
- 1953: Taimi Kroon
- 1954: Maila Kurss
- 1955: Helvi Keller
- 1956: Helgi Haljasmaa
- 1957: Õie Munk
- 1958: Helgi Kivi
- 1959: Linda Kivi
- 1960: Valentina Pavlovitš
- 1961: Eha Sepp
- 1962: Valentina Pavlovitš
- 1963: Valentina Pavlovitš
- 1964: Valentina Pavlovitš
- 1965: Valentina Pavlovitš
- 1966: Ene Rampe
- 1967: Õie Munk
- 1968: Muza Vorotõntseva
- 1969: Ester Aavik
- 1970: Muza Lepik
- 1971: Reet Kaarneem
- 1972: Reet Kaarneem
- 1973: Malle Sang
- 1974: Malle Sang
- 1975: Reet Arrak
- 1976: Reet Arrak
- 1977: Marina Surovtseva
- 1978: Ljubov Stognei
- 1979: Reet Lindal
- 1980: Merle Kibus
- 1981: Lea Laks
- 1982: Siiri Schmidt
- 1983: Maiu Siraki
- 1984: Merle Kibus
- 1985: Maiu Siraki
- 1986: Ingrid Pulst
- 1987: Merike Suurkivi
- 1988: Virge Naeris
- 1989: Ly Niinelaid
- 1990: Ly Niinelaid
- 1991: Marika Raiski
- 1992: Virge Naeris
- 1993: Liina Põldots
- 1994: Virge Naeris
- 1995: Liina Põldots
- 1996: Liina Põldots
- 1997: Kärt Siilats
- 1998: Kärt Siilats
- 1999: Tiina Mägi
- 2000: Kärt Siilats
- 2001: Tiina Mägi
- 2002: Kärt Siilats
- 2003: Kärt Siilats
- 2004: Kärt Siilats
- 2005: Anna Iljuštšenko
- 2006: Anna Iljuštšenko
- 2007: Anna Iljuštšenko
- 2008: Anna Iljuštšenko
- 2009: Anna Iljuštšenko
- 2010: Anna Iljuštšenko
- 2011: Anna Iljuštšenko
- 2012: Eleriin Haas
- 2013: Anna Iljuštšenko
- 2014: Eleriin Haas
- 2015: Eleriin Haas
- 2016: Anna Iljuštšenko
- 2017: Grete Udras
- 2018: Eleriin Haas
- 2019: Grete Udras
- 2020: Lilian Turban
- 2021: Lilian Turban
- 2022: Karmen Bruus

== Finland ==
- 1980: Minna Vehmasto
- 1981: Minna Vehmasto
- 1982: Lena Teckenberg
- 1983: Minna Vehmasto
- 1984: Niina Ranta
- 1985: Niina Vihanto (Ranta)
- 1986: Minna Rantanen
- 1987: Ringa Ropo
- 1988: Marita Pakarinen
- 1989: Sari Karjalainen
- 1990: Katja Kilpi
- 1991: Katja Kilpi
- 1992: Katja Kilpi
- 1993: Johanna Manninen
- 1994: Kaisa Lehtonen
- 1995: Kaisa Gustafsson
- 1996: Kaisa Gustafsson
- 1997: Kaisa Gustafsson
- 1998: Kaisa Gustafsson
- 1999: Marianne Mattas
- 2000: Hanna Mikkonen
- 2001: Hanna Mikkonen
- 2002: Hanna Mikkonen
- 2003: Hanna Mikkonen
- 2004: Alina Mattila
- 2005: Hanna Mikkonen
- 2006: Hanna Mikkonen
- 2007: Hanna Mikkonen
- 2008: Hanna Grobler (Mikkonen)
- 2009: Hanna Grobler (Mikkonen)
- 2010: Maiju Mattila
- 2011: Mari Sepänmaa
- 2012: Eleriin Haas (EST)
- 2013: Laura Rautanen
- 2014: Eleriin Haas (EST)

== France ==
- 1980: Sylvie Prenveille
- 1981: Brigitte Rougeron
- 1982: Maryse Ewanjé-Epée
- 1983: Maryse Ewanjé-Epée
- 1984: Maryse Ewanjé-Epée
- 1985: Maryse Ewanjé-Epée
- 1986: Brigitte Rougeron
- 1987: Madely Beaugendre
- 1988: Maryse Ewanjé-Epée
- 1989: Madely Beaugendre
- 1990: Odile Lesage
- 1991: Jana Brenkusová (TCH)
- 1992: Sandrine Fricot
- 1993: Maryse Maury
- 1994: Sandrine Fricot
- 1995: Maryse Maury
- 1996: Maryse Maury
- 1997: Marie Collonvillé
- 1998: Sabrina De Leeuw (BEL)
- 1999: Irène Tiendrébéogo (BUR)
- 2000: Sabrina De Leeuw (BEL)
- 2001: Lucie Finez
- 2002: Gaëlle Niaré
- 2003: Gaëlle Niaré
- 2004: Gaëlle Niaré
- 2005: Melanie Skotnik
- 2006: Eunice Barber
- 2007: Melanie Skotnik
- 2008: Melanie Skotnik
- 2009: Melanie Melfort

== Germany ==
=== East Germany ===
- 1971: Rita Schmidt
- 1972: Rita Schmidt
- 1973: Rosemarie Witschas
- 1974: Rosemarie Witschas
- 1975: Rita Kirst
- 1976: Rosemarie Ackermann
- 1977: Rosemarie Ackermann
- 1978: Jutta Kirst
- 1979: Rosemarie Ackermann
- 1980: Rosemarie Ackermann
- 1981: Andrea Reichstein
- 1982: Andrea Bienias
- 1983: Susanne Helm
- 1984: Andrea Bienias
- 1985: Susanne Helm
- 1986: Andrea Bienias
- 1987: Susanne Beyer
- 1988: Gabriele Günz
- 1989: Heike Balck
- 1990: Heike Balck

=== West Germany ===
- 1971: Renate Gärtner
- 1972: Ellen Mundinger
- 1973: Ulrike Meyfarth
- 1974: Karin Wagner
- 1975: Ulrike Meyfarth
- 1976: Brigitte Holzapfel
- 1977: Marlis Wilken
- 1978: Brigitte Holzapfel
- 1979: Ulrike Meyfarth
- 1980: Ulrike Meyfarth
- 1981: Ulrike Meyfarth
- 1982: Ulrike Meyfarth
- 1983: Ulrike Meyfarth
- 1984: Heike Redetzky
- 1985: Heike Redetzky
- 1986: Heike Redetzky
- 1987: Heike Redetzky
- 1988: Heike Redetzky
- 1989: Andrea Arens
- 1990: Heike Henkel

=== Unified Germany ===
- 1991: Heike Henkel
- 1992: Heike Henkel
- 1993: Heike Henkel
- 1994: Heike Balck
- 1995: Alina Astafei
- 1996: Alina Astafei
- 1997: Heike Balck
- 1998: Alina Astafei
- 1999: Heike Henkel
- 2000: Amewu Mensah
- 2001: Alina Astafei
- 2002: Elena Herzenberg
- 2003: Melanie Skotnik
- 2004: Ariane Friedrich
- 2005: Daniela Rath
- 2006: Julia Hartmann
- 2007: Ariane Friedrich
- 2008: Ariane Friedrich
- 2009: Ariane Friedrich
- 2010: Ariane Friedrich
- 2011: Melanie Bauschke
- 2012: Ariane Friedrich
- 2013: Marie-Laurence Jungfleisch
- 2014: Marie-Laurence Jungfleisch
- 2015: Marie-Laurence Jungfleisch

== Great Britain ==
- 1970: Dorothy Shirley
- 1971: Debbie Brill (CAN)
- 1972: Ros Few
- 1973: Ilona Gusenbauer (AUT)
- 1974: Val Harrison
- 1975: Denise Brown
- 1976: Denise Brown
- 1977: Brenda Gibbs
- 1978: Carol Mathers
- 1979: Barbara Simmonds
- 1980: Ann-Marie Devally
- 1981: Ann-Marie Devally
- 1982: Barbara Simmonds
- 1983: Gillian Evans
- 1984: Diana Elliott
- 1985: Diana Davies(-Elliott)
- 1986: Diana Davies
- 1987: Hanne Haugland (NOR)
- 1988: Janet Boyle
- 1989: Diana Davies
- 1990: Lea Haggett
- 1991: Debbie Marti
- 1992: Lea Haggett
- 1993: Debbie Marti
- 1994: Julia Bennett
- 1995: Lea Haggett
- 1996: Debbie Marti
- 1997: Debbie Marti
- 1998: Jo Jennings
- 1999: Jo Jennings
- 2000: Jo Jennings
- 2001: Susan Jones
- 2002: Susan Jones
- 2003: Susan Jones
- 2004: Susan Jones
- 2005: Susan Jones
- 2006: Deirdre Ryan (IRL)
- 2007: Jessica Ennis
- 2008: Stephanie Pywell

== Hungary ==
- 1980: Katalin Sterk
- 1981: Emese Béla
- 1982: Katalin Sterk
- 1983: Emese Béla
- 1984: Olga Juha
- 1985: Andrea Mátay
- 1986: Katalin Sterk
- 1987: Olga Juha
- 1988: Katalin Sterk
- 1989: Judit Kovács
- 1990: Judit Kovács
- 1991: Judit Kovács
- 1992: Judit Kovács
- 1993: Krisztina Solti
- 1994: Erzsébet Fazekas
- 1995: Erzsébet Fazekas
- 1996: Dóra Győrffy
- 1997: Dóra Győrffy
- 1998: Dóra Győrffy
- 1999: Dóra Győrffy
- 2000: Dóra Győrffy
- 2001: Dóra Győrffy
- 2002: Dóra Győrffy
- 2003: Dóra Győrffy
- 2004: Bernadett Bódi
- 2005: Dóra Győrffy
- 2006: Dóra Győrffy
- 2007: Dóra Győrffy
- 2008: Barbara Szabó
- 2009: Barbara Szabó
- 2010: Rita Babos
- 2011: Rita Babos
- 2012: Barbara Szabó
- 2013: Barbara Szabó
- 2014: Barbara Szabó
- 2015: Barbara Szabó
- 2016: Barbara Szabó
- 2017: Barbara Szabó

== Italy ==
- 1923: L. Banzi
- 1924: Andreina Sacchi
- 1925: Andreina Sacchi
- 1926: L. Banzi
- 1927: Silia Martini
- 1928: Silia Martini
- 1929: Silia Martini
- 1930: Trebisonda Valla
- 1931: Trebisonda Valla
- 1932: Maria Cosselli
- 1933: Trebisonda Valla
- 1934: E. Lambertini
- 1935: M. Montarino
- 1936: Tina Migliasso
- 1937: Trebisonda Valla
- 1938: Modesta Puhar
- 1939: Elda Franco
- 1940: Trebisonda Valla
- 1941: Sara Aldovandri
- 1942: Gianna Jannoni
- 1943: C. Gallo
- 1944: not disputed
- 1945: not disputed
- 1946: Ester Palmesino
- 1947: Gianna Jannoni
- 1948: Ester Palmesino
- 1949: Gianna Jannoni
- 1950: Gianna Jannoni
- 1951: Gianna Jannoni
- 1952: Ester Palmesino
- 1953: Ester Palmesino
- 1954: Osvalda Giardi
- 1955: Paola Paternoster
- 1956: Osvalda Giardi
- 1957: Osvalda Giardi
- 1958: Osvalda Giardi
- 1959: Marinella Bortoluzzi
- 1960: Osvalda Giardi
- 1961: Marinella Bortoluzzi
- 1962: Osvalda Giardi
- 1963: Marinella Bortoluzzi
- 1964: Osvalda Giardi
- 1965: Gilda Cacciavillani
- 1966: Osvalda Giardi
- 1967: Anna Onofri
- 1968: Annalisa Lanci
- 1969: Rosa Bellamoli
- 1970: Sara Simeoni
- 1971: Sara Simeoni
- 1972: Sara Simeoni
- 1973: Sara Simeoni
- 1974: Sara Simeoni
- 1975: Sara Simeoni
- 1976: Sara Simeoni
- 1977: Sara Simeoni
- 1978: Sara Simeoni
- 1979: Sara Simeoni
- 1980: Sara Simeoni
- 1981: Sandra Dini
- 1982: Sara Simeoni
- 1983: Sara Simeoni
- 1984: Sandra Dini
- 1985: Sara Simeoni
- 1986: Alessandra Fossati
- 1987: Alessandra Bonfigliolo
- 1988: Barbara Fiammengo
- 1989: Roberta Bugarini
- 1990: Barbara Fiammengo
- 1991: Barbara Fiammengo
- 1992: Antonella Bevilacqua
- 1993: Antonella Bevilacqua
- 1994: Antonella Bevilacqua
- 1995: Francesca Sicari
- 1996: Antonella Bevilacqua
- 1997: Antonella Bevilacqua
- 1998: Francesca Bradamante
- 1999: Daniela Galeotti
- 2000: Antonietta Di Martino
- 2001: Antonietta Di Martino
- 2002: Anna Visigalli
- 2003: Antonella Bevilacqua
- 2004: Anna Visigalli
- 2005: Stefania Cadamuro
- 2006: Antonietta Di Martino
- 2007: Antonietta Di Martino
- 2008: Antonietta Di Martino
- 2009: Raffaella Lamera
- 2010: Antonietta Di Martino
- 2011: Raffaella Lamera
- 2012: Chiara Vitobello
- 2013: Alessia Trost
- 2014: Alessia Trost
- 2015: Desirée Rossit
- 2016: Alessia Trost
- 2017: Erika Furlani
- 2018: Elena Vallortigara
- 2019: Alessia Trost
- 2020: Elena Vallortigara
- 2021: Elena Vallortigara
- 2022: Elena Vallortigara

== Japan ==
- 1980: Hisayo Fukumitsu
- 1981: Megumi Sato
- 1982: Hisayo Fukumitsu
- 1983: Megumi Sato
- 1984: Hisayo Fukumitsu
- 1985: Megumi Sato
- 1986: Masami Matsui
- 1987: Megumi Sato
- 1988: Megumi Sato
- 1989: Kim Hee-sun (KOR)
- 1990: Megumi Sato
- 1991: Megumi Sato
- 1992: Megumi Sato
- 1993: Megumi Sato
- 1994: Chinami Sadahiro
- 1995: Miki Imai
- 1996: Yoko Ota
- 1997: Yoko Ota
- 1998: Miki Imai
- 1999: Miki Imai
- 2000: Yoko Ota
- 2001: Miki Imai
- 2002: Yoko Ota
- 2003: Miki Imai
- 2004: Miki Imai
- 2005: Yoko Hunnicutt
- 2006: Miyuki Aoyama
- 2007: Miyuki Aoyama
- 2008: Miyuki Fukumoto
- 2009: Miyuki Fukumoto
- 2010: Kiyoka Fujisawa
- 2011: Miyuki Fukumoto
- 2012: Azumi Maeda
- 2013: Miyuki Fukumoto
- 2014: Yuki Watanabe
- 2015: Yuki Watanabe
- 2016: Moeko Kyoya
- 2017: Haruka Nakano
- 2018: Haruka Nakano
- 2019: Natsumi Kanda

== Latvia ==
- 1991: Valentīna Gotovska
- 1992: Valentīna Gotovska
- 1993: Valentīna Gotovska
- 1994: Valentīna Gotovska
- 1995: Valentīna Gotovska
- 1996: Valentīna Gotovska
- 1997: Aiga Gulbe
- 1998: Aiga Gulbe
- 1999: Iveta Grunte
- 2000: Līga Kļaviņa
- 2001: Iveta Grunte
- 2002: Līga Kļaviņa
- 2003: Natālija Čakova
- 2004: Natālija Čakova
- 2005: Agnese Segliņa
- 2006: Natālija Čakova
- 2008: Natālija Čakova
- 2009: Natālija Čakova
- 2010: Laura Ikauniece

== Lithuania ==
- 1990: Valentīna Gotovska (LAT)
- 1991: Nelė Savickytė
- 1992: Nelė Savickytė
- 1993: Nelė Žilinskienė
- 1994: Nelė Žilinskienė
- 1995: Dalia Leonavičiūtė
- 1996: Nelė Žilinskienė
- 1997: Remigija Nazarovienė
- 1998: Nelė Žilinskienė
- 1999: Nelė Žilinskienė
- 2000: Nelė Žilinskienė
- 2001: Nelė Žilinskienė
- 2002: Nelė Žilinskienė
- 2003: Viktorija Žemaitytė
- 2004: Viktorija Žemaitytė
- 2005: Austra Skujytė
- 2006: Viktorija Žemaitytė
- 2007: Karina Vnukova
- 2008: Karina Vnukova
- 2009: Karina Vnukova

== Netherlands ==
- 1970: Miep van Beek
- 1971: Mieke van Doorn
- 1972: Ria Ahlers
- 1973: Ria Ahlers
- 1974: Annemieke Bouma
- 1975: Mieke van Doorn
- 1976: Ria Ahlers
- 1977: Mirjam van Laar
- 1978: Mirjam van Laar
- 1979: Sylvia Barlag
- 1980: Sylvia Barlag
- 1981: Sylvia Barlag
- 1982: Ella Wijnants
- 1983: Ella Wijnants
- 1984: Marjon Wijnsma
- 1985: Mariette Overwater
- 1986: Ella Wijnants
- 1987: Ella Wijnants
- 1988: Monique van der Weide
- 1989: Marjon Wijnsma
- 1990: Monique van der Weide
- 1991: Angelique Maasdijk
- 1992: Anoek van Diessen
- 1993: Bianca Gelauf
- 1994: Anoek van Diessen
- 1995: Karlijn van Beurden
- 1996: Monique van der Weide
- 1997: Marieke van der Heijden
- 1998: Marloes Lammerts
- 1999: Marloes Lammerts
- 2000: Denise Lewis (GBR)
- 2001: Marloes Lammerts
- 2002: Marloes Strooper-Lammerts
- 2003: Frenke Bolt
- 2004: Karin Ruckstuhl
- 2005: Yvonne Wisse
- 2006: Karin Ruckstuhl
- 2007: Karin Ruckstuhl
- 2008: Sietske Noorman
- 2009: Sietske Noorman
- 2010: Nadine Broersen
- 2011: Nadine Broersen
- 2012: Sietske Noorman
- 2013: Sietske Noorman
- 2014: Nadine Broersen
- 2015: Sietske Noorman
- 2016: Marlies van Haaren

== New Zealand ==
- 1980: Claire Kavermann
- 1981: Angela Pule
- 1982: Claire Ryan
- 1983: Trudy Painter
- 1984: Trudy Painter
- 1985: Trudy Painter
- 1986: Trudy Painter
- 1987: Sue Barber
- 1988: Tania Murray
- 1989: Trudy Woodhead
- 1990: Tania Murray
- 1991: Tania Murray
- 1992: Tania Murray
- 1993: Tracy Phillips
- 1994: Tracy Phillips
- 1995: Kim Brown
- 1996: Tracy Phillips
- 1997: Tania Dixon
- 1998: Karen Brown
- 1999: Kim Brown
- 2000: Angela McKee
- 2001: Karen Brown
- 2002: Nadia Smith
- 2003: Angela McKee
- 2004: Angela McKee
- 2005: Angela McKee
- 2006: Angela McKee
- 2007: Sarah Cowley
- 2008: Sarah Saddleton
- 2009: Elizabeth Lamb
- 2010: Sarah Cowley

== Poland ==
- 1970: Danuta Konowska
- 1971: Danuta Prociów
- 1972: Danuta Konowska
- 1973: Anna Bubała
- 1974: Danuta Hołowińska
- 1975: Anna Pstuś
- 1976: Eugenia Więcek
- 1977: Danuta Bułkowska
- 1978: Urszula Kielan
- 1979: Elżbieta Krawczuk
- 1980: Urszula Kielan
- 1981: Elżbieta Krawczuk
- 1982: Danuta Bułkowska
- 1983: Danuta Bułkowska
- 1984: Danuta Bułkowska
- 1985: Danuta Bułkowska
- 1986: Danuta Bułkowska
- 1987: Danuta Bułkowska
- 1988: Danuta Bułkowska
- 1989: Danuta Bułkowska
- 1990: Beata Hołub
- 1991: Beata Hołub
- 1992: Beata Hołub
- 1993: Beata Hołub
- 1994: Urszula Kielan
- 1995: Donata Wawrzyniak
- 1996: Donata Jancewicz
- 1997: Agnieszka Giedrojć-Juraha
- 1998: Donata Jancewicz
- 1999: Donata Jancewicz
- 2000: Donata Jancewicz
- 2001: Anna Ksok
- 2002: Agnieszka Falasa
- 2003: Anna Ksok
- 2004: Anna Ksok
- 2005: Anna Ksok
- 2006: Karolina Gronau
- 2007: Kamila Stepaniuk
- 2008: Kamila Stepaniuk
- 2009: Kamila Stepaniuk
- 2010: Karolina Gronau
- 2011: Karolina Gronau/Magdalena Ogrodnik
- 2012: Izabela Mikołajczyk
- 2013: Justyna Kasprzycka
- 2014: Justyna Kasprzycka
- 2015: Kamila Lićwinko (Stepaniuk)
- 2016: Kamila Lićwinko (Stepaniuk)
- 2017: Kamila Lićwinko (Stepaniuk)
- 2018: Michalina Kwaśniewska
- 2019: Kamila Lićwinko (Stepaniuk)

== Portugal ==
- 1970: Kathleen Binda
- 1971: Marília Carvalho
- 1972: Marília Carvalho
- 1973: Marília Carvalho
- 1974: Conceição Alves
- 1975: Conceição Alves
- 1976: Conceição Alves
- 1977: Cristina Abreu
- 1978: Cristina Abreu
- 1979: Cristina Abreu
- 1980: Cristina Abreu
- 1981: Cristina Abreu
- 1982: Cristina Abreu
- 1983: Graça Borges
- 1984: Graça Borges
- 1985: Graça Borges
- 1986: Graça Borges
- 1987: Manuela Barros
- 1988: Graça Borges
- 1989: Isabel Branco
- 1990: Maria José Travessa
- 1991: Isabel Branco
- 1992: Isabel Branco
- 1993: Isabel Branco
- 1994: Sandra Turpin
- 1995: Sónia Machado
- 1996: Sandra Turpin
- 1997: Sónia Machado
- 1998: Sónia Carvalho
- 1999: Sónia Carvalho
- 2000: Sónia Machado
- 2001: Sónia Carvalho
- 2002: Naide Gomes
- 2003: Liliana Viana
- 2004: Sónia Carvalho
- 2005: Sónia Carvalho
- 2006: Marisa Anselmo
- 2007: Marisa Anselmo
- 2008: Marisa Anselmo
- 2009: Marisa Anselmo
- 2010: Marisa Anselmo
- 2011: Liliana Viana
- 2012: Liliana Vieira
- 2013: Liliana Vieira
- 2014: Anabela Neto
- 2015: Anabela Neto
- 2016: Anabela Neto
- 2017: Anabela Neto
- 2018: Anabela Neto
- 2019: Anabela Neto
- 2020: Anabela Neto

== Romania ==
- 1980: Cornelia Popa
- 1981: Niculina Vasile
- 1982: Niculina Vasile
- 1983: Gabriela Margineanu
- 1984: Niculina Vasile
- 1985: Gabriela Mihalcea
- 1986: Alina Astafei
- 1987: Elena Schromm
- 1988: Alina Astafei
- 1989: Alina Astafei
- 1990: Olimpia Constantea
- 1991: Olimpia Constantea
- 1992: Alina Astafei
- 1993: Oana Musunoi
- 1994: Adriana Solcanu
- 1995: Monica Iagăr
- 1996: Monica Iagăr
- 1997: Monica Iagăr
- 1998: Monica Iagăr
- 1999: Oana Pantelimon
- 2000: Monica Iagăr
- 2001: Oana Pantelimon
- 2002: Ramona Pop
- 2003: Oana Pantelimon
- 2004: Monica Iagăr
- 2005: Monica Iagăr
- 2006: Andreea Ispan

== Russia ==
- 1992: Yelena Gribanova
- 1993: Yelena Topchina
- 1994: Yelena Topchina
- 1995: Viktoriya Fyodorova
- 1996: Tatyana Motkova
- 1997: Olga Kaliturina
- 1998: Viktoriya Fyodorova
- 1999: Yelena Yelesina
- 2000: Marina Kuptsova
- 2001: Yekaterina Aleksandrova
- 2002: Marina Kuptsova
- 2003: Marina Kuptsova
- 2004: Anna Chicherova
- 2005: Yelena Slesarenko
- 2006: Yekaterina Savchenko
- 2007: Anna Chicherova
- 2008: Anna Chicherova
- 2009: Anna Chicherova
- 2010: Svetlana Shkolina
- 2011: Anna Chicherova
- 2012: Anna Chicherova

== Spain ==
- 1931: Aurora Villa
- 1932: Aurora Villa
- 1933: María Morros
- 1935: Josefa Wunderlich
- 1963: Mercedes Morales
- 1964: María Teresa Carrascosa
- 1965: Mercedes Morales
- 1966: Teresa María Roca
- 1967: Teresa María Roca
- 1968: Sagrario Aguado
- 1969: Teresa María Roca
- 1970: Sagrario Aguado
- 1971: Teresa María Roca
- 1972: Sagrario Aguado
- 1973: Sagrario Aguado
- 1974: Sagrario Aguado
- 1975: Sagrario Aguado
- 1976: Isabel Mozún
- 1977: Isabel Mozún
- 1978: Isabel Mozún
- 1979: Isabel Mozún
- 1980: Isabel Mozún
- 1981: Isabel Mozún
- 1982: Isabel Mozún
- 1983: Isabel Mozún
- 1984: Isabel Mozún
- 1985: Covadonga Mateos
- 1986: Covadonga Mateos
- 1987: Asunción Morte
- 1988: Mónica Calvo
- 1989: Isabel Mozún
- 1990: María Mar Martínez
- 1991: Belén Sáenz
- 1992: Belén Sáenz
- 1993: Belén Sáenz
- 1994: María Mar Martínez
- 1995: Marta Mendía
- 1996: Carlota Castrejana
- 1997: Marta Mendía
- 1998: María Mar Martínez

- 1999: Marta Mendía
- 2000: Marta Mendía
- 2001: Marta Mendía
- 2002: Marta Mendía
- 2003: Ruth Beitia
- 2004: Marta Mendía
- 2005: Marta Mendía
- 2006: Ruth Beitia
- 2007: Ruth Beitia
- 2008: Ruth Beitia
- 2009: Ruth Beitia
- 2010: Ruth Beitia
- 2011: Ruth Beitia
- 2012: Ruth Beitia
- 2013: Ruth Beitia
- 2014: Ruth Beitia
- 2015: Ruth Beitia
- 2016: Ruth Beitia
- 2017: Ruth Beitia

== Sweden ==
- 1980: Ann-Ewa Karlsson
- 1981: Susanne Lorentzon
- 1982: Susanne Lorentzon
- 1983: Susanne Lorentzon
- 1984: Susanne Lorentzon
- 1985: Susanne Lorentzon
- 1986: Susanne Lorentzon
- 1987: Monica Westén
- 1988: Monica Westén
- 1989: Christina Nordström
- 1990: Monica Westén
- 1991: Ann Högberg
- 1992: Maria Gruffman
- 1993: Ingela Sandqvist
- 1994: Emelie Färdigh
- 1995: Emelie Färdigh
- 1996: Emelie Färdigh
- 1997: Kajsa Bergqvist
- 1998: Kajsa Bergqvist
- 1999: Kajsa Bergqvist
- 2000: Kajsa Bergqvist
- 2001: Kajsa Bergqvist
- 2002: Kajsa Bergqvist
- 2003: Kajsa Bergqvist
- 2004: Carolina Klüft
- 2005: Emma Green
- 2006: Kajsa Bergqvist
- 2007: Emma Green
- 2008: Emma Green
- 2009: Emma Green
- 2010: Emma Green
- 2011: Emma Green Tregaro

== Ukraine ==
- 1992: Inha Babakova
- 1993: Larisa Serebryanska
- 1994: Iryna Mykhalchenko
- 1995: Vita Styopina
- 1996: Vita Styopina
- 1997: Iryna Mykhalchenko
- 1998: Iryna Mykhalchenko
- 1999: Vita Styopina
- 2000: Iryna Mykhalchenko
- 2001: Vita Palamar
- 2002: Iryna Mykhalchenko
- 2003: Vita Palamar
- 2004: Vita Styopina
- 2005: Iryna Mykhalchenko
- 2006: Iryna Mykhalchenko
- 2007: Vita Palamar
- 2008: Vita Styopina
- 2009: Vita Styopina
- 2010: Vita Styopina
- 2011: Oksana Okunyeva
- 2012: Olena Kholosha
- 2013: Oksana Okunyeva
- 2014: Oksana Okunyeva
- 2015: Oksana Okunyeva
- 2016: Oksana Okunyeva
- 2017: Oksana Okunyeva
- 2018: Yuliya Levchenko
- 2019: Yuliya Levchenko
- 2020: Oksana Okunyeva

== United States ==
- 1959: Lis Josefsen (DEN)
- 1960: Lis Josefsen (DEN)
- 1961: Lis Josefsen (DEN)
- 1962: Kinuko Sutsumi (JAP)
- 1963: Eleanor Montgomery
- 1964: Eleanor Montgomery
- 1965: Eleanor Montgomery
- 1966: Eleanor Montgomery
- 1967: Eleanor Montgomery
- 1968: Theresa Thresher
- 1969: Eleanor Montgomery
- 1970: Sally Plihal
- 1971: Linda Iddings
- 1972: Audrey Reid (JAM)
- 1973: Deanne Wilson
- 1974: Joni Huntley
- 1975: Joni Huntley
- 1976: Joni Huntley
- 1977: Joni Huntley
- 1978: Louise Ritter
- 1979: Debbie Brill (CAN)
- 1980: Coleen Rienstra
- 1981: Pam Spencer
- 1982: Debbie Brill (CAN)
- 1983: Louise Ritter
- 1984: Pam Spencer
- 1985: Louise Ritter
- 1986: Louise Ritter
- 1987: Coleen Sommer
- 1988: Jan Wohlschlag
- 1989: Jan Wohlschlag
- 1990: Yolanda Henry
- 1991: Yolanda Henry
- 1992: Tanya Hughes
- 1993: Tanya Hughes
- 1994: Angela Bradburn
- 1995: Amy Acuff
- 1996: Tisha Waller
- 1997: Amy Acuff
- 1998: Tisha Waller
- 1999: Tisha Waller

- 2000: Karol Damon
- 2001: Amy Acuff
- 2002: Tisha Waller
- 2003: Amy Acuff
- 2004: Tisha Waller
- 2005: Amy Acuff
- 2006: Chaunté Howard
- 2007: Amy Acuff
- 2008: Chaunté Howard
- 2009: Chaunté Howard
- 2010: Chaunté Lowe
- 2011: Brigetta Barrett
- 2012: Chaunté Lowe
- 2013: Brigetta Barrett
- 2014: Chaunté Lowe
- 2015: Chaunté Lowe

== Yugoslavia ==
- 1980: Lidija Benedetić
- 1981: Stanka Prezelj
- 1982: Lidija Lapajne
- 1983: Biljana Bojović
- 1984: Tamara Malešev
- 1985: Darja Lichteneger
- 1986: Biljana Petrović
- 1987: Biljana Petrović
- 1988: Amra Temim
- 1989: Biljana Petrović
- 1990: Biljana Petrović
- 1991: Gabrijela Markuš
- 1992: Szilvia Barta
- 1993: Jasna Antonijević
- 1994: Tatjana Mitrovic
- 1995: Jasna Antonijević
- 1996: Jasna Antonijević
- 1997: Marijana Buljovcic
- 1998: Marijana Buljovcic
- 1999: Jelena Šcekic
- 2000: Jelena Šcekic
- 2001: Marija Plazinic
- 2002: Mirjana Lisica

== See also ==
- List of high jump national champions (men)
