= 1994 European Athletics Championships – Women's high jump =

Women's high jump at the European Athletics Championships

These are the official results of the Women's high jump event at the 1994 European Championships in Helsinki, Finland, held at Helsinki Olympic Stadium on 12 and 14 August 1994. There were a total number of 35 participating athletes.

== Medalists ==
Gold	Britta Bilač; Slovenia (SLO)
Silver	Yelena Gulyayeva; Russia (RUS)
Bronze	Nelė Žilinskienė; Lithuania (LTU)

== Qualification ==
- Held on 12 August 1994

Rank	Group A	Height
1.	Britta Bilač (SLO)	1.92 m
2.	Heike Henkel (GER)	1.92 m
3.	Inga Babakova (UKR)	1.92 m
4.	Yelena Gulyayeva (RUS)	1.92 m
5.	Zuzana Hlavoňová (CZE)	1.90 m
6.	Katarzyna Majchrzak (POL)	1.90 m
7.	Olga Bolşova (MDA)	1.90 m
8.	Yevgeniya Zhdanova (RUS)	1.90 m
9.	Eleonora Milusheva (BUL)	1.88 m
10.	Julia Bennett (GBR)	1.85 m
10.	Sandrine Fricot (FRA)	1.85 m
10.	Monica Iagăr (ROM)	1.85 m
13.	Valentīna Gotovska (LAT)	1.85 m
14.	Pia Zink (DEN)	1.85 m
15.	Hanne Andersen (NOR)	1.80 m
15.	Claudia Ellinger (SUI)	1.80 m
17.	Tatyana Khramova (BLR)	1.80 m
—	Lenka Rihaková (SVK)	NM

Rank	Group B	Height
1.	Tatyana Shevchik (BLR)	1.92 m
2.	Nelė Žilinskienė (LTU)	1.92 m
3.	Yelena Topchina (RUS)	1.92 m
4.	Svetlana Leseva (BUL)	1.92 m
5.	Heike Balck (GER)	1.90 m
5.	Hanne Haugland (NOR)	1.90 m
5.	Sigrid Kirchmann (AUT)	1.90 m
8.	Sieglinde Cadusch (SUI)	1.90 m
9.	Ina Gliznuța (MDA)	1.90 m
10.	Laura Sharpe (IRL)	1.85 m
10.	Antonella Bevilacqua (ITA)	1.85 m
10.	Donata Jancewicz (POL)	1.85 m
13.	Erzsebet Fazekas (HUN)	1.85 m
14.	Natalia Jonckheere (BEL)	1.85 m
15.	Debbie Marti (GBR)	1.85 m
16.	Niki Bakoyanni (GRE)	1.80 m
17.	Lea Haggett (GBR)	1.75 m

== Final ==
Rank	Final	Height
	Britta Bilač (SLO)	2.00 m
	Yelena Gulyayeva (RUS)	1.96 m
	Nelė Žilinskienė (LTU)	1.93 m
4.	Inga Babakova (UKR)	1.93 m
5.	Hanne Haugland (NOR)	1.93 m
6.	Heike Balck (GER)	1.93 m
7.	Svetlana Leseva (BUL)	1.90 m
7.	Yelena Topchina (RUS)	1.90 m
9.	Tatyana Shevchik (BLR)	1.90 m
10.	Sigrid Kirchmann (AUT)	1.90 m
11.	Heike Henkel (GER)	1.85 m
12.	Zuzana Hlavoňová (CZE)	1.85 m

== Participation ==
According to an unofficial count, 35 athletes from 24 countries participated in the event.

- Austria (1)
- Belarus (2)
- Belgium (1)
- Bulgaria (2)
- Czech Republic (1)
- Denmark (1)
- France (1)
- Germany (2)
- Greece (1)
- Hungary (1)
- Ireland (1)
- Italy (1)
- Latvia (1)
- Lithuania (1)
- Moldova (2)
- Norway (2)
- Poland (2)
- Romania (1)
- Russia (3)
- Slovakia (1)
- Slovenia (1)
- Switzerland (2)
- Ukraine (1)
- United Kingdom (3)

== See also ==
- 1991 Women's World Championships High Jump (Tokyo)
- 1992 Women's Olympic High Jump (Barcelona)
- 1993 Women's World Championships High Jump (Stuttgart)
- 1995 Women's World Championships High Jump (Gothenburg)
- 1996 Women's Olympic High Jump (Atlanta)
- 1997 Women's World Championships High Jump (Athens)
