= 1995 World Championships in Athletics – Women's high jump =

These are the official results of the Women's High Jump event at the 1995 IAAF World Championships in Gothenburg, Sweden. There were a total number of 38 participating athletes, with two qualifying groups and the final held on Sunday August 13, 1995.

== Schedule ==
- All times are Central European Time (UTC+1)

Qualification Round
Group A	Group B
11.08.1995 – 09:40h	11.08.1995 – 09:40h
Final Round
13.08.1995 – 15:15h

== Results ==
=== Qualifying round ===
- Held on Friday 1995-08-11

Qualification: Qualifying Performance 1.95 (Q) or at least 12 best performers (q) advance to the final.

Rank	Group	Name	Nationality	1.75	1.80	1.85	1.90	1.93	1.95	Result	Notes
1	A	Inga Babakova	Ukraine							1.95	Q
2	A	Viktoriya Fyodorova	Russia							1.95	Q
3	A	Amy Acuff	United States							1.93	q
3	A	Tatyana Shevchik	Belarus							1.93	q
3	A	Svetlana Isaeva-Leseva	Bulgaria							1.93	q
3	A	Yelena Topchina	Russia							1.93	q
7	A	Venelina Veneva	Bulgaria							1.93	
8	A	Heike Henkel	Germany							1.93	
9	A	Kajsa Bergqvist	Sweden							1.90	
9	A	Monica Iagăr-Dinescu	Romania							1.90	
11	A	Alica Javadová	Slovakia							1.90	
12	A	Silvia Costa	Cuba							1.85	
12	A	Alison Inverarity	Australia							1.85	
12	A	Natalia Jonckheere	Belgium							1.85	
15	A	Svetlana Munkova	Uzbekistan							1.85	
15	A	Kaisa Gustafsson	Finland							1.85	
17	A	Heike Balck	Germany							1.80	
18	A	Irène Tiéndrebeogo	Burkina Faso							1.80	
1	B	Tatyana Motkova	Russia							1.95	Q
1	B	Stefka Kostadinova	Bulgaria							1.95	Q
1	B	Alina Astafei	Germany							1.95	Q
4	B	Hanne Haugland	Norway							1.95	Q
5	B	Nelė Žilinskienė	Lithuania							1.95	Q
6	B	Tatyana Khramova	Belarus							1.93	q
7	B	Sieglinde Cadusch	Switzerland							1.93	
8	B	Svetlana Zalevskaya	Kazakhstan							1.93	
9	B	Tisha Waller	United States							1.90	
10	B	Ioamnet Quintero	Cuba							1.90	
11	B	Najuma Fletcher	Guyana							1.90	=NR
12	B	Pia Zinck	Denmark							1.90	
13	B	Zuzana Kováčiková	Czech Republic							1.85	
14	B	Olga Bolşova	Moldova							1.85	
15	B	Connie Teaberry	United States							1.80	
16	B	Monika Gollner	Austria							1.80	
17	B	Lea Haggett	Great Britain							1.75	
	B	Desiré du Plessis	South Africa							DNS	

=== Final ===
Rank	Name	Nationality	1.80	1.85	1.90	1.93	1.96	1.99	2.01	2.03	Result	Notes
1st place, gold medalist(s)	Stefka Kostadinova	Bulgaria	–	o	o	o	o	o	xo	xxx	2.01	
2nd place, silver medalist(s)	Alina Astafei	Germany	–	o	xo	o	o	o	xxx		1.99	
3rd place, bronze medalist(s)	Inga Babakova	Ukraine	–	o	o	o	o	xo	xxx		1.99	
4	Tatyana Motkova	Russia	–	o	o	o	o	xxx			1.96	
5	Tatyana Shevchik	Belarus	–	o	xo	o	o	xxx			1.96	
6	Hanne Haugland	Norway	–	o	xo	o	xo	xxx			1.96	
7	Svetlana Isaeva-Leseva	Bulgaria	o	xo	o	o	xxx				1.93	
8	Amy Acuff	United States	o	o	xxo	xo	xxx				1.93	
8	Nelė Žilinskienė	Lithuania	o	xxo	o	xo	xxx				1.93	
10	Yelena Topchina	Russia	o	o	o	xxo	xxx				1.93	
11	Viktoriya Fyodorova	Russia	xo	o	o	xxx					1.90	
12	Tatyana Khramova	Belarus	o	o	xxx						1.85	

== See also ==
- National champions high jump (women)
- 1993 Women's World Championships High Jump
- 1996 Women's Olympic High Jump
- 1997 Women's World Championships High Jump
