= 1995 IAAF World Indoor Championships – Women's high jump =

The women's high jump event at the 1995 IAAF World Indoor Championships was held on 10–11 March.

== Medalists ==
Gold	Silver	Bronze
Alina Astafei; Germany	Britta Bilač; Slovenia	Heike Henkel; Germany

== Results ==
=== Qualification ===
Qualification: 1.92 (Q) or at least 12 best performers (q) qualified for the final.

Rank	Group	Name	Nationality	1.80	1.85	1.90	1.92	Result	Notes
1	B	Tatyana Motkova	Russia	–	o	o	o	1.92	Q
1	B	Yelena Gulyayeva	Russia	o	o	o	o	1.92	Q
1	B	Britta Bilač	Slovenia	o	o	o	o	1.92	Q
4	B	Heike Henkel	Germany	–	o	xo	o	1.92	Q
4	B	Alina Astafei	Germany	–	xo	o	o	1.92	Q
6	B	Tatyana Shevchik	Belarus	o	o	o	xo	1.92	Q
7	B	Monica Iagăr	Romania	o	o	xo	xo	1.92	Q
7	B	Tisha Waller	United States	xo	o	o	xo	1.92	Q
9	B	Hanne Haugland	Norway	–	o	xxo	xxo	1.92	Q
10	B	Natalia Jonckheere	Belgium	o	o	o	xxx	1.90	q
11	B	Svetlana Leseva	Bulgaria	o	xxo	o	xxx	1.90	q
12	A	Yolanda Henry	United States	o	o	xo	xxx	1.90	q
12	A	Kajsa Bergqvist	Sweden	o	o	xo	xxx	1.90	q
12	B	Sigrid Kirchmann	Austria	–	o	xo	xxx	1.90	q
15	B	Olga Bolshova	Moldova	o	o	xxx		1.85	
16	A	Sieglinde Cadusch	Switzerland	o	xo	xxx		1.85	
16	A	Svetlana Zalevskaya	Kazakhstan	o	xo	xxx		1.85	
16	A	Šárka Makówková	Czech Republic	o	xo	xxx		1.85	
16	B	Venelina Veneva	Bulgaria	o	xo	xxx		1.85	
20	A	Monika Gollner	Austria	xxo	xo	xxx		1.85	
21	A	Emelie Färdigh	Sweden	o	xxo	xxx		1.85	
22	A	Tania Dixon	New Zealand	xo	xxo	xxx		1.85	
23	A	Carlota Castrejana	Spain	o	xxx			1.80	
23	A	Niki Gavera	Greece	o	xxx			1.80	
23	A	Svetlana Munkova	Uzbekistan	o	xxx			1.80	
23	B	Ioamnet Quintero	Cuba	o	xxx			1.80	
27	A	Niki Bakoyianni	Greece	xo	xxx			1.80	
27	A	Valentīna Gotovska	Latvia	xo	xxx			1.80	
29	A	Laura Sharpe	Ireland	xxo	xxx			1.80	
	A	Vita Styopina	Ukraine	xxx				NM	
	A	Kaisa Gustafsson	Finland	xxx				DNS	
	B	Silvia Costa	Cuba	xxx				DNS	

=== Final ===
Rank	Name	Nationality	1.85	1.90	1.93	1.96	1.99	2.01	2.05	Results	Notes
1st place, gold medalist(s)	Alina Astafei	Germany	o	o	o	o	o	o	xxx	2.01	
2nd place, silver medalist(s)	Britta Bilač	Slovenia	o	o	o	o	xo	xxx		1.99	
3rd place, bronze medalist(s)	Heike Henkel	Germany	o	o	o	o	xxo	xxx		1.99	
4	Tatyana Motkova	Russia	o	o	o	o	xxx			1.96	
5	Yelena Gulyayeva	Russia	o	o	o	xo	xxx			1.96	
6	Tatyana Shevchik	Belarus	o	xo	o	xo	xxx			1.96	
7	Tisha Waller	United States	o	o	o	xxx				1.93	
8	Sigrid Kirchmann	Austria	o	xo	o	xxx				1.93	
9	Hanne Haugland	Norway	o	o	xxo	xxx				1.93	
9	Natalia Jonckheere	Belgium	o	o	xxo	xxx				1.93	
11	Monica Iagăr	Romania	o	o	xxx					1.90	
12	Svetlana Leseva	Bulgaria	o	xxx						1.85	
13	Kajsa Bergqvist	Sweden	xo	xxx						1.85	
	Yolanda Henry	United States	xxx							NM	
