= 1997 World Championships in Athletics – Women's high jump =

These are the official results of the Women's High Jump event at the 1997 IAAF World Championships in Athens, Greece. There were a total number of 26 participating athletes, with two qualifying groups on Friday August 8, and the final round held on Sunday August 10, 1997.

== Medalists ==
Gold	Hanne Haugland; Norway (NOR)
Silver	Olga Kaliturina; Russia (RUS)
Silver	Inga Babakova; Ukraine (UKR)

== Results ==
=== Qualifying round ===
Qualification: Qualifying Performance 1.94 (Q) or at least 12 best performers (q) advance to the final.

Rank	Group	Name	Nationality	1.80	1.85	1.89	1.92	1.94	Result	Notes
1	A	Alina Astafei	Germany	–	o	o	o	o	1.94	Q
1	A	Hanne Haugland	Norway	–	o	o	o	o	1.94	Q
1	A	Kajsa Bergqvist	Sweden	o	o	o	o	o	1.94	Q
1	A	Hestrie Storbeck	South Africa	o	o	o	o	o	1.94	Q
1	B	Yuliya Lyakhova	Russia	o	o	o	o	o	1.94	Q
6	A	Inga Babakova	Ukraine	–	xo	o	o	o	1.94	Q
6	A	Olga Kaliturina	Russia	o	o	o	xo	o	1.94	Q
6	B	Heike Balck	Germany	o	o	o	xo	o	1.94	Q
9	A	Tatyana Motkova	Russia	o	o	xo	xo	o	1.94	Q
10	B	Britta Bilač	Slovenia	o	o	xo	o	xo	1.94	Q
11	A	Pia Zinck	Denmark	o	o	o	o	xxo	1.94	Q, NR
11	B	Monica Iagăr-Dinescu	Romania	o	o	o	o	xxo	1.94	Q
13	B	Antonella Bevilacqua	Italy	o	o	o	xo	xxo	1.94	Q
14	B	Amy Acuff	United States	o	o	o	o	xxx	1.92	
15	A	Niki Bakoyianni	Greece	o	o	o	xo	xxx	1.92	
16	A	Solange Witteveen	Argentina	o	xo	o	xxo	xxx	1.92	
17	B	Çiğdem Arslan	Turkey	o	o	o	xxx		1.89	
18	A	Angela Bradburn	Canada	o	xo	o	xxx		1.89	
19	B	Debbie Marti	Great Britain	o	o	xo	xxx		1.89	
20	A	Tatyana Khramova	Belarus	o	o	xxx			1.85	
21	B	Zuzana Kováčiková-Hlavoňová	Czech Republic	xo	o	xxx			1.85	
22	B	Erin Aldrich	United States	xo	xxx				1.80	
22	B	Inna Gliznuta	Moldova	xo	xxx				1.80	
24	B	Daniela Rath	Germany	xxo	xxx				1.80	
	A	Oksana Mayboroda	Kyrgyzstan	xxx					NM	
	B	Irène Tiéndrebeogo	Burkina Faso	xxx					NM	

=== Final ===
Rank	Name	Nationality	1.85	1.90	1.93	1.96	1.99	1.99	Result	Notes
1st place, gold medalist(s)	Hanne Haugland	Norway	o	o	o	o	xxx	o	1.99	
2nd place, silver medalist(s)	Olga Kaliturina	Russia	o	o	o	o	xxx	x	1.96	
2nd place, silver medalist(s)	Inga Babakova	Ukraine	o	o	o	o	xxx	x	1.96	
4	Yuliya Lyakhova	Russia	o	o	xxo	xxo	xxx		1.96	
5	Kajsa Bergqvist	Sweden	o	xo	xo	xxx			1.93	
5	Tatyana Motkova	Russia	o	xo	xo	xxx			1.93	
7	Antonella Bevilacqua	Italy	o	o	xxo	xxx			1.93	
7	Alina Astafei	Germany	o	o	xxo	xxx			1.93	
7	Britta Bilač	Slovenia	o	o	xxo	xxx			1.93	
10	Hestrie Storbeck	South Africa	o	o	xxx				1.90	
10	Heike Balck	Germany	o	o	xxx				1.90	
12	Pia Zinck	Denmark	o	xxo	xxx				1.90	
13	Monica Iagăr−Dinescu	Romania	o	xxx					1.85	

== See also ==
- National champions high jump (women)
- 1995 Women's World Championships High Jump
- 1996 Women's Olympic High Jump
- 1999 Women's World Championships High Jump
