= 1996 European Athletics Indoor Championships – Women's high jump =

The women's high jump event at the 1996 European Athletics Indoor Championships was held in Stockholm Globe Arena on 8–10 March.

== Medalists ==
Gold	Silver	Bronze
Alina Astafei; Germany	Niki Bakoyianni; Greece	Olga Bolşova; Moldova

== Results ==
=== Qualification ===
Qualification performance: 1.92 (Q) or at least 12 best performers (q) advanced to the final.

Rank	Athlete	Nationality	Result	Notes
1	Monica Iagăr	Romania	1.92	Q
1	Zuzana Kováčiková	Czech Republic	1.92	Q
3	Alina Astafei	Germany	1.90	q
3	Niki Bakoyianni	Greece	1.90	q
3	Olga Bolşova	Moldova	1.90	q
3	Donata Wawrzyniak	Poland	1.90	q
3	Kajsa Bergqvist	Sweden	1.90	q
3	Natalya Golodnova	Russia	1.90	q
3	Alica Javadová	Slovakia	1.90	q
3	Viktoriya Seryogina	Russia	1.90	q
3	Nelė Žilinskienė	Lithuania	1.90	q
12	Pia Zinck	Denmark	1.88	q
13	Iryna Mykhalchenko	Ukraine	1.88	
13	Maryse Maury	France	1.88	
15	Emelie Färdigh	Sweden	1.85	
15	Isabelle Jeanne	France	1.85	
17	Monika Gollner	Austria	1.80	
17	Zhanna Dyatlovskaya	Belarus	1.80	
17	Tatyana Khramova	Belarus	1.80	
17	Desislava Aleksandrova-Mladenova	Bulgaria	1.80	
17	Debbie Marti	Great Britain	1.80	
	Venelina Veneva	Bulgaria	NM	

=== Final ===
Rank	Name	Nationality	1.80	1.85	1.89	1.92	1.94	1.96	1.98	2.01	Result	Notes
1st place, gold medalist(s)	Alina Astafei	Germany	–	o	o	–	o	xo	xxo	xxx	1.98	
2nd place, silver medalist(s)	Niki Bakoyianni	Greece	o	o	o	o	o	o	xxx		1.96	NR
3rd place, bronze medalist(s)	Olga Bolşova	Moldova	o	o	o	xxo	o	xxx			1.94	NR
4	Nelė Žilinskienė	Lithuania									1.94	
5	Monica Iagăr	Romania									1.94	
6	Kajsa Bergqvist	Sweden									1.92	
7	Natalya Golodnova	Russia									1.89	
8	Pia Zinck	Denmark									1.89	
8	Alica Javadová	Slovakia									1.89	
10	Donata Wawrzyniak	Poland									1.89	
11	Viktoriya Seryogina	Russia									1.89	
12	Zuzana Kováčiková	Czech Republic									1.80	
