= 2000 European Athletics Indoor Championships – Women's high jump =

The women's high jump event at the 2000 European Athletics Indoor Championships was held on February 25–26.

== Medalists ==
Gold	Silver	Bronze
Kajsa Bergqvist; Sweden	Zuzana Hlavoňová; Czech Republic	Olga Kaliturina; Russia

== Results ==
=== Qualification ===
Qualification: Qualification Performance 1.93 (Q) or at least 8 best performers advanced to the final.

Rank	Athlete	Nationality	1.75	1.80	1.85	1.88	1.91	1.93	Result	Notes
1	Kajsa Bergqvist	Sweden							1.93	Q
2	Zuzana Hlavoňová	Czech Republic							1.93	Q
3	Olga Kaliturina	Russia							1.93	Q
4	Viktoriya Palamar	Ukraine							1.93	Q
5	Venelina Veneva	Bulgaria							1.91	q
6	Viktoriya Slivka	Russia							1.91	q
7	Viktoriya Seryogina	Russia							1.91	q
8	Heike Henkel	Germany	–	o	o	xxo	xo	xxx	1.91	q
9	Nevena Lendel	Croatia	o	o	o	o	xxo	xxx	1.91	PB
10	Antonella Bevilacqua	Italy							1.85	
10	Nelė Žilinskienė	Lithuania							1.85	SB
12	Olga Bolshova	Moldova							1.85	
12	Marta Mendía	Spain							1.85	
14	Sabrina De Leeuw	Belgium							1.85	
14	Gaëlle Niaré	France							1.85	
16	Amewu Mensah	Germany	o	xo	xo	xxx			1.85	
17	Sigrid Kirchmann	Austria							1.80	
17	Renáta Medgyesová	Slovakia							1.80	
19	Lucie Finez	France							1.80	
20	Daniela Galeotti	Italy							1.80	
	Agni Charalambous	Cyprus							DNS	
	Hanne Haugland	Norway							DNS	

=== Final ===
Rank	Athlete	Nationality	1.80	1.85	1.89	1.92	1.94	1.96	1.98	2.00	2.05	Result	Notes
1st place, gold medalist(s)	Kajsa Bergqvist	Sweden	–	o	o	xo	o	x–	o	xo	xxx	2.00	=NR
2nd place, silver medalist(s)	Zuzana Hlavoňová	Czech Republic	xo	o	xo	xo	xo	–	xo	xxx		1.98	NR
3rd place, bronze medalist(s)	Olga Kaliturina	Russia	o	o	xxo	xxo	xo	o	xxx			1.96	SB
4	Venelina Veneva	Bulgaria	o	o	o	o	xxx					1.92	
5	Viktoriya Palamar	Ukraine	o	o	xxo	o	xxx					1.92	
6	Viktoriya Slivka	Russia	o	o	o	xo	xxx					1.92	
7	Viktoriya Seryogina	Russia	xo	xo	o	xxo	xxx					1.92	
8	Heike Henkel	Germany	o	o	xxx							1.85	
