= 1999 World Championships in Athletics – Women's high jump =

These are the official results of the Women's High Jump event at the 1999 IAAF World Championships in Athletics in Seville, Spain. There were a total number of 31 participating athletes, with two qualifying groups and the final held on Sunday 29 August 1999 at 18:45h.

== Medalists ==
Gold	Inga Babakova; Ukraine (UKR)
Silver	Yelena Yelesina; Russia (RUS)
Bronze	Svetlana Lapina; Russia (RUS)

== Schedule ==
- All times are Central European Time (UTC+1)

Qualification Round
Group A	Group B
27.08.1999 – 18:55h	27.08.1999 – 18:55h
Final Round
29.08.1999 – 18:45h

== Abbreviations ==
- All results shown are in metres

Q	automatic qualification
q	qualification by rank
DNS	did not start
NM	no mark
WR	world record
AR	area record
NR	national record
PB	personal best
SB	season best

== Results ==
=== Qualifying round ===
Qualification: Qualifying Performance 1.94 (Q) or at least 12 best performers (q) advance to the final.

Rank	Group	Name	Nationality	1.75	1.80	1.85	1.89	1.92	1.94	Result	Notes
1	A	Inga Babakova	Ukraine	–	o	o	o	o	x	1.92	q
1	A	Tisha Waller	United States	–	o	o	o	o	x	1.92	q
1	A	Yelena Rodina-Gulyayeva	Russia	–	o	o	o	o	x	1.92	q
1	B	Hanne Haugland	Norway	–	o	o	o	o	–	1.92	q
1	B	Viktoriya Styopina	Ukraine	–	o	o	o	o	x	1.92	q
1	B	Zuzana Hlavoňová	Czech Republic	–	o	o	o	o	–	1.92	q
7	B	Yelena Yelesina	Russia	–	o	xo	o	o	–	1.92	q
8	B	Amewu Mensah	Germany	o	o	o	o	xo	–	1.92	q
9	B	Svetlana Lapina	Russia	–	o	o	xxo	xo	–	1.92	q
10	A	Kajsa Bergqvist	Sweden	–	o	o	o	xxo	xx	1.92	q
10	B	Amy Acuff	United States	–	o	o	o	xxo	x	1.92	q
12	B	Monica Dinescu-Iagăr	Romania	–	o	o	xxo	xxo	x	1.92	q
13	B	Svetlana Zalevskaya	Kazakhstan	–	xo	o	xxo	xxo	–	1.92	q
14	A	Hestrie Storbeck-Cloete	South Africa	–	o	o	o	xxx		1.89	
14	A	Venelina Veneva	Bulgaria	o	o	o	o	xxx		1.89	
14	A	Iryna Mykhalchenko	Ukraine	–	o	o	o	xxx		1.89	
17	A	Karol Jenkins	United States	–	o	o	xo	xxx		1.89	
17	A	Nelė Žilinskienė	Lithuania	–	o	o	xo	xxx		1.89	
19	A	Olga Bolshova	Moldova	–	o	xo	xo	xxx		1.89	
19	B	Marta Mendia	Spain	o	o	xo	xo	xxx		1.89	
21	A	Irène Tiéndrebeogo	Burkina Faso	o	o	xxo	xo	xxx		1.89	
22	A	Kärt Siilats	Estonia	xo	xxo	xo	xo	xxx		1.89	
23	B	Miki Imai	Japan	–	xo	o	xxo	xxx		1.89	
24	A	Linda Horvath	Austria	o	o	o	xxx			1.85	
24	B	Lucie Finez	France	o	o	o	xxx			1.85	
26	A	Yoko Ota	Japan	–	xo	o	xxx			1.85	
26	B	Nevena Lendjel	Croatia	xo	o	o	xxx			1.85	
28	A	Niki Bakogianni	Greece	–	o	xo	xxx			1.85	
28	B	Tatyana Shevchik	Belarus	–	o	xo	xxx			1.85	
30	B	Solange Witteveen	Argentina	o	o	xxo	xxx			1.85	
31	B	Ina Gliznuta	Moldova	o	xo	xxo	xxx			1.85	
32	A	Tatiana Efimenko	Kyrgyzstan	–	o	xxx				1.80	
32	A	Nicole Forrester	Canada	o	o	xxx				1.80	
	B	Donata Jancewicz-Wawrzyniak	Poland							DNS	

=== Final ===
Rank	Name	Nationality	1.85	1.90	1.93	1.96	1.99	2.01	Result	Notes
1st place, gold medalist(s)	Inga Babakova	Ukraine	o	o	o	o	o	xxx	1.99	
2nd place, silver medalist(s)	Yelena Yelesina	Russia	o	o	o	o	xo	xxx	1.99	
3rd place, bronze medalist(s)	Svetlana Lapina	Russia	o	o	xxo	xxo	xxo	xxx	1.99	
4	Tisha Waller	United States	o	o	o	o	xxx		1.96	
4	Kajsa Bergqvist	Sweden	o	o	o	o	xxx		1.96	
4	Zuzana Hlavoňová	Czech Republic	o	o	o	o	xxx		1.96	
7	Viktoriya Styopina	Ukraine	o	o	xxo	o	xxx		1.96	
8	Svetlana Zalevskaya	Kazakhstan	o	o	o	xxx			1.93	
9	Amy Acuff	United States	o	xxo	o	x–	xx		1.93	
10	Hanne Haugland	Norway	o	o	xo	xxx			1.93	
10	Monica Dinescu-Iagăr	Romania	o	o	xo	xxx			1.93	
12	Yelena Rodina-Gulyayeva	Russia	o	o	xxo	xxx			1.93	
	Amewu Mensah	Germany	xxx						NM	
