= 1993 World Championships in Athletics – Women's high jump =

These are the official results of the Women's High Jump event at the 1993 IAAF World Championships in Stuttgart, Germany. There were a total number of 38 participating athletes, with two qualifying groups and the final held on Saturday August 21, 1993. The qualification mark was set at 1.93 metres.

== Schedule ==
- All times are Central European Time (UTC+1)

Qualification Round
Group A	Group B
19.08.1993 – 10:20h	19.08.1993 – 10:20h
Final Round
21.08.1993 – 16:40h

== Abbreviations ==
- All results shown are in metres

Q	automatic qualification
q	qualification by rank
DNS	did not start
NM	no mark
WR	world record
AR	area record
NR	national record
PB	personal best
SB	season best

== Results ==
=== Qualifying round ===
- Held on Thursday 1993-08-19

Rank	Group	Name	Nationality	1.65	1.70	1.75	1.80	1.84	1.87	1.90	1.93	Result	Notes
1	A	Hanne Haugland	Norway									1.93	Q
1	A	Yelena Gulyayeva	Russia									1.93	Q
1	A	Silvia Costa	Cuba									1.93	Q
4	A	Sigrid Kirchmann	Austria									1.90	q
4	A	Britta Bilač	Slovenia									1.90	q
6	A	Stefka Kostadinova	Bulgaria	–	–	–	–	o	xo	o	xxx	1.90	
6	A	Tatyana Shevchik	Belarus									1.90	
8	A	Heike Balck	Germany									1.87	
9	A	Sue Rembao	United States									1.87	
10	A	Andrea Arens-Baumert	Germany									1.87	
11	A	Þórdís Gísladóttir	Iceland									1.84	
12	A	Sabrina De Leeuw	Belgium									1.84	
13	A	Krisztina Solti	Hungary									1.84	
14	A	Niki Bakogianni	Greece									1.84	
15	A	Joanne Jennings	Great Britain	–	–	o	o	xxx				1.80	
15	A	Charmaine Weavers	South Africa									1.80	
17	A	Šárka Nováková	Czech Republic									1.80	
18	A	Sharon Foley	Ireland									1.75	
	A	Inna Gliznuta	Moldova									NM	
1	B	Alina Astafei	Romania									1.93	Q
1	B	Ioamnet Quintero	Cuba									1.93	Q
1	B	Yelena Topchina	Russia									1.93	Q
4	B	Svetlana Zalevskaya	Kazakhstan									1.93	Q
5	B	Valentīna Gotovska	Latvia									1.93	Q
5	B	Antonella Bevilacqua	Italy									1.93	Q
7	B	Tanya Hughes	United States									1.93	Q
8	B	Katarzyna Majchrzak	Poland									1.90	q
8	B	Heike Henkel	Germany									1.90	q
10	B	Nelė Žilinskienė	Lithuania									1.90	
11	B	Connie Teaberry	United States									1.87	
11	B	Orlane Maria dos Santos	Brazil									1.87	
13	B	Olga Bolşova	Moldova									1.87	
14	B	Judit Kovács	Hungary									1.84	
14	B	Lucienne N'Da	Ivory Coast									1.84	
16	B	Desislava Aleksandrova	Bulgaria									1.80	
17	B	Megumi Sato	Japan									1.75	
18	B	Orla Venter	Namibia									1.75	
	B	Debbie Marti	Great Britain									DNS	

=== Final ===
Rank	Name	Nationality	1.75	1.80	1.85	1.88	1.91	1.94	1.97	1.99	2.01	2.05	Result	Notes
1st place, gold medalist(s)	Ioamnet Quintero	Cuba	–	–	o	–	o	o	xxo	xo	–	xxx	1.99	
2nd place, silver medalist(s)	Silvia Costa	Cuba	–	–	o	–	o	o	o	xx–	x		1.97	
3rd place, bronze medalist(s)	Sigrid Kirchmann	Austria	–	–	o	o	o	o	xo	xx-	x		1.97	NR
4	Alina Astafei	Romania	–	–	o	–	o	o	xxx				1.94	
4	Yelena Gulyayeva	Russia	–	–	o	o	o	o	xxx				1.94	
6	Antonella Bevilacqua	Italy	–	o	o	o	o	xxo	xxx				1.94	
7	Tanya Hughes	United States	–	o	o	o	o	xxx					1.91	
8	Valentīna Gotovska	Latvia	–	o	xxo	xo	o	xxx					1.91	
9	Katarzyna Majchrzak	Poland											1.88	
9	Hanne Haugland	Norway											1.88	
11	Svetlana Zalevskaya	Kazakhstan											1.88	
11	Yelena Topchina	Russia											1.88	
11	Britta Bilač	Slovenia											1.88	
	Heike Henkel	Germany											DNS	

== See also ==
- National champions high jump (women)
- 1992 Women's Olympic High Jump
