= 1999 IAAF World Indoor Championships – Women's high jump =

The women's high jump event at the 1999 IAAF World Indoor Championships was held on March 5.

== Results ==
Rank	Athlete	Nationality	1.85	1.90	1.93	1.96	1.99	Result	Notes
1st place, gold medalist(s)	Khristina Kalcheva	Bulgaria	o	xo	xo	o	xo	1.99	PB
2nd place, silver medalist(s)	Zuzana Hlavoňová	Czech Republic	o	o	o	o	xxx	1.96	
3rd place, bronze medalist(s)	Tisha Waller	United States	o	o	o	xxo	xxx	1.96	SB
4	Monica Iagăr-Dinescu	Romania	o	o	xo	xxx		1.93	
5	Mária Melová	Slovakia	o	xxo	xo	xxx		1.93	
6	Yuliya Lyakhova	Russia	o	o	xxx			1.90	
7	Viktoriya Seryogina	Russia	o	xo	xxx			1.90	
8	Miki Imai	Japan	o	xxx				1.85	
