= Joni Huntley =

American high jumper

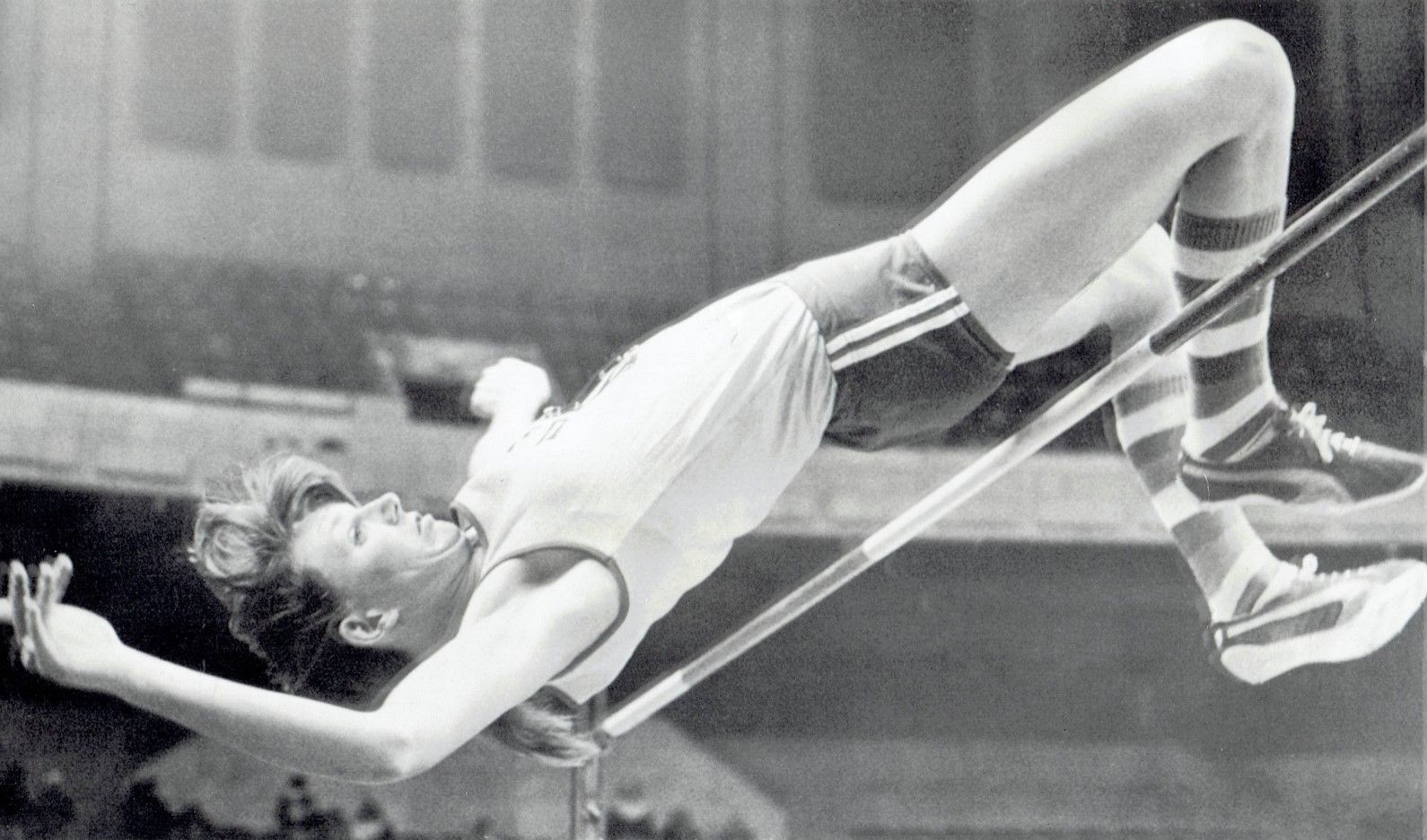
- Huntley in 1975

Personal information
- Full name: Joni Luann Huntley
- Born: August 4, 1956 (age 69) McMinnville, Oregon, U.S.
- Height: 173 cm (5 ft 8 in)
- Weight: 61 kg (134 lb)

Sport
- Sport: Athletics
- Event: High jump
- College team: Oregon State
- Club: Pacific Coast Club, Long Beach

Achievements and titles
- Personal best: 1.97 m (1984)
Medal record
Women's athletics
Representing the United States
Olympic Games
Bronze medal – third place	1984 Los Angeles	High jump
Pan American Games
Gold medal – first place	1975 Mexico City	High jump
Bronze medal – third place	1983 Caracas	High jump

Joni Luann Huntley (born August 4, 1956) is an American high jumper. She competed at the 1976 and 1984 Olympics and won a bronze medal in 1984, placing fifth in 1976. At the Pan American Games she won a gold medal in 1975 and a bronze in 1983. She was ranked as third-best high jumper in the world in 1975. Domestically she won the national title in 1974–77 and set four American records in 1974–75.

== Prep ==
Huntley was born in McMinnville, Oregon, and raised in Sheridan, Oregon, where she attended Sheridan High School. While there she was the first high school girl over 6 feet, setting the NFHS national high school record.

== College ==
Huntley is a graduate of Oregon State University graduate school and Long Beach State undergraduate. Huntley set an OSU high jump record of 6 feet 2 3/4 inches, which still stands. Huntley graduated from Long Beach State in California to work with 1988 Summer Olympics assistant coach Dave Rodda.

== Professional ==
Huntley served as an assistant track and field coach at Oregon State Beavers starting in 1981 when she started her masters of education program at Oregon State University College of Education.

Huntley spent her professional career as a kindergarten teacher in the Portland Public Schools and as a coach, including leading workshops for young athletes and coaching for the Portland Track Club.

== Personal ==
Huntley is a retired teacher at Forest Park Elementary and she lives in the Portland Metro area and has two daughters.

Sporting positions
Preceded by (United States) Deanne Wilson	USA National High Jump Champion; 1974–1977	Succeeded by (United States) Louise Ritter
