= Karol Rovelto =

American high jumper (born 1969)

Personal information
- Born: Karol Damon; December 20, 1969 (age 56) Austin, Texas, U.S.

Sport
- Country: United States
- Sport: Athletics
- Event: High jump

Karol Rovelto, née Damon (born December 20, 1969) is a retired American high jumper.

Rovelto is from Redlands, California where she attended Redlands High School. She was an All-American jumper for the Colorado Buffaloes track and field team, placing 3rd in the high jump at the 1991 NCAA Division I Indoor Track and Field Championships and 1991 NCAA Division I Outdoor Track and Field Championships.

She finished eighth at the 1994 World Cup.

She also competed at the 1999 World Indoor Championships, the 1999 World Championships and the 2000 Summer Olympics.

Her personal best jump was 1.97 metres, achieved in June 2003 in Palo Alto.

She was born in Austin, Texas.
