= Pia Zinck =

Danish high jumper

Pia Zinck (born 4 May 1971) is a retired female high jumper from Denmark. She is a seven-time national champion (1992–1998) in the women's high jump.

Zinck finished eighth at the 1996 European Indoor Championships and twelfth at the 1997 World Championships. She also competed at the 1994 European Championships, the 1995 World Championships and the 1997 World Indoor Championships without reaching the final.

Her personal best jump is 1.94 metres, achieved in the qualifying round at the 1997 World Championships. It’s still the national record.

== Competition record ==
Year	Competition	Venue	Position	Notes
Representing Denmark
1994	European Championships	Helsinki, Finland	23rd (q)	1.85 m
1995	World Championships	Gothenburg, Sweden	20th (q)	1.90 m
1996	European Indoor Championships	Stockholm, Sweden	8th	1.89 m
1997	World Indoor Championships	Paris, France	16th (q)	1.90 m
1997	World Championships	Athens, Greece	12th	1.90 m
1998	European Indoor Championships	Valencia, Spain	7th	1.89 m
1998	European Championships	Budapest, Hungary	8th	1.89 m
