= Sylvia Barlag =

Dutch athletics competitor

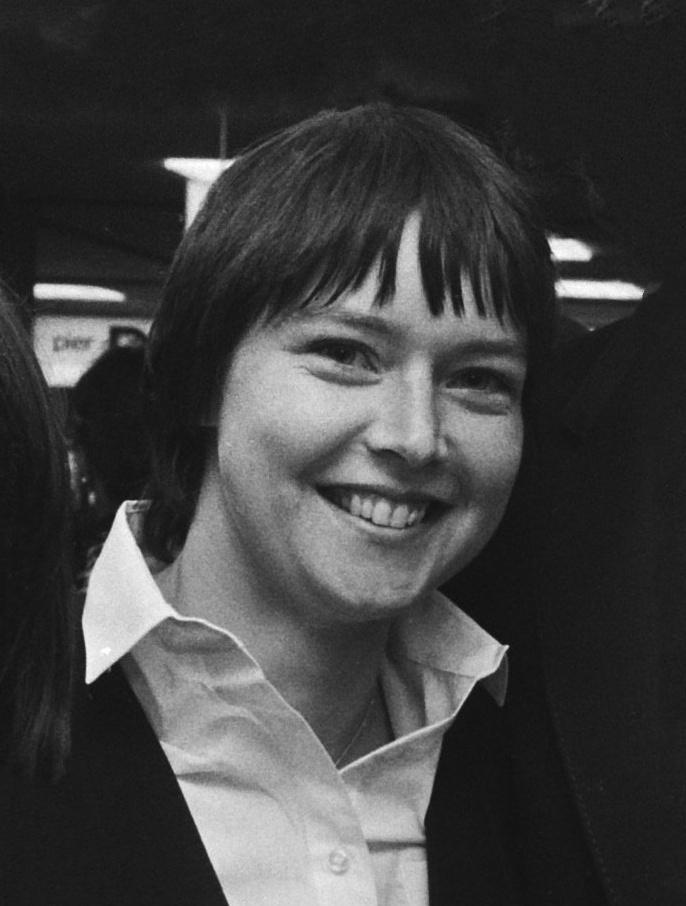
- Sylvia Barlag in 1980

Personal information
- Born: 4 May 1954 (age 72) Amsterdam, the Netherlands
- Height: 1.70 m (5 ft 7 in)
- Weight: 60 kg (130 lb)

Sport
- Sport: Pentathlon, high jump
- Club: ADA, Amsterdam
Medal record
Representing Netherlands
Summer Universiade
Silver medal – second place	1979 Mexico City	Pentathlon

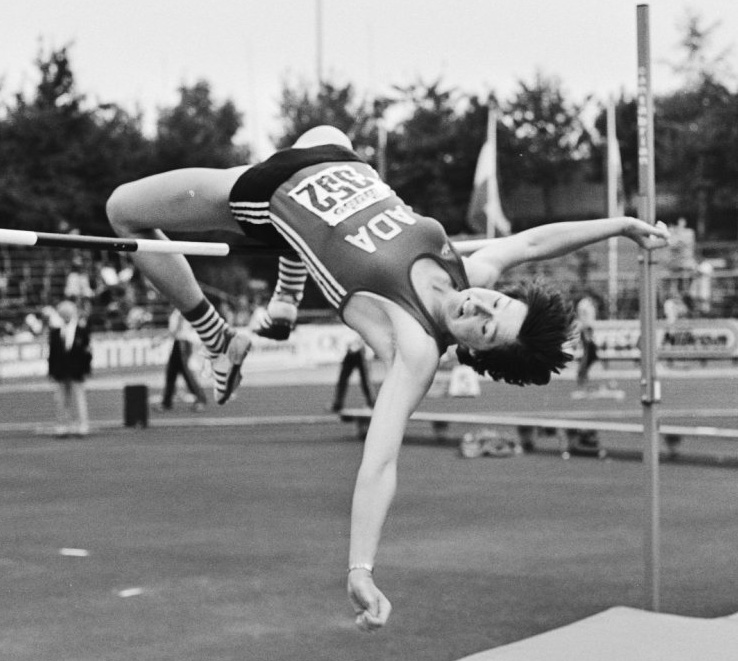
Barlag in 1980

Sylvia Johanna Martha Barlag (born 4 May 1954) is a retired track and field athlete and physicist from the Netherlands. She competed in pentathlon at the 1980 Summer Olympics and finished in 10th place. Between 1979 and 1981 she was the national champion in the high jump.

== Biography ==
Barlag holds a PhD in physics from the University of Amsterdam (1984).

Between 1983 and 1989 she worked as a researcher at CERN, in the Obelix experiment for LEAR, as part of the collaborative charm hadroproduction experiment for Super Proton Synchrotron (SPS) as well as in DELPHI for LEP. From 1989 to 2006, she worked at the Royal Netherlands Meteorological Institute.

Barlag got married in 1987, and has two children.

She works as a quality control manager in an international high-tech firm, and is a member of national (2002–present), European (2007–present) and international (2011–present) athletics federations.

== Olympic results ==
Games	Age	City	Sport	Event	Team	NOC	Rank	Medal
1980 Summer	26	Moscow	Athletics	Women's pentathlon	Netherlands	NED	10	-

Games	Age	City	Sport	Country	Phase	Unit	Rank	P(1977AT)	P(1985AT)	T(A)	D	P(1977T)	P(1985T)	H
1980 Summer	26	Moscow	Athletics	Netherlands	Final standings	-	10	4.333	4.315	-	-	-	-	-
1980 Summer	26	Moscow	Athletics	Netherlands	100 metre hurdles	-	16	841	950	14.20	-	-	-	-
1980 Summer	26	Moscow	Athletics	Netherlands	100 metre hurdles	Heat one	5	841	950	14.20	-	-	-	-
1980 Summer	26	Moscow	Athletics	Netherlands	Shot put	-	16	-	-	-	11.82	708	649	-
1980 Summer	26	Moscow	Athletics	Netherlands	High jump	-	4T	-	-	-	-	1.031	978	1.80
1980 Summer	26	Moscow	Athletics	Netherlands	Long jump	-	10	-	-	-	6.05	917	865	-
1980 Summer	26	Moscow	Athletics	Netherlands	800 metres	-	10	836	873	2:16.4	-	-	-	-
1980 Summer	26	Moscow	Athletics	Netherlands	800 metres	Heat one	2	836	873	2:16.4	-	-	-	-

Awards
Preceded by Mirjam van Laar	KNAU Cup; 1978 – 1980	Succeeded by Els Vader
