= Britta Bilač =

German-Slovene high jumper

Medal record

Women's athletics

Representing Slovenia

European Championships
Gold medal – first place	1994 Helsinki	High jump

Britta Bilač (née Vörös) (born 4 December 1968 in Saalfeld, Thuringia, East Germany) is a retired high jumper who competed internationally for Germany and Slovenia from 1992 onwards. Her greatest achievement was the European Championship victory in 1994 with a personal best jump of 2.00 m.

She won the 1989 Hochsprung mit Musik with a leap of 1.84 m.

Formerly representing East Germany, she married Slovenian long jumper Borut Bilač and thus became a Slovenian citizen in 1992.

== Achievements ==
Year	Competition	Venue	Position	Notes
Representing East Germany
1990	European Indoor Championships	Glasgow, United Kingdom	2nd	1.94 m
Representing Slovenia
1992	European Indoor Championships	Genoa, Italy	4th	1.91 m
1992	Olympic Games	Barcelona, Spain	15th	1.83 m (1.92 m)
1993	World Championships	Stuttgart, Germany	11th	1.88 m (1.90 m)
1993	Mediterranean Games	Narbonne, France	1st	1.92 m
1994	European Championships	Helsinki, Finland	1st	2.00 m PB (1.92 m)
1994	World Cup	London, United Kingdom	1st	1.91 m
1995	World Indoor Championships	Barcelona, Spain	2nd	1.99 m (1.92 m)
1996	Olympic Games	Atlanta, United States	9th	1.93 m (1.93 m)
1997	World Indoor Championships	Paris, France	12th	1.90 m (1.93 m)
1997	Mediterranean Games	Bari, Italy	3rd	1.91 m
1997	World Championships	Athens, Greece	7th	1.93 m (1.94 m)

- Results in brackets indicate height achieved in qualifying round

Sporting positions
Preceded by (Bulgaria) Stefka Kostadinova	Women's High Jump Best Year Performance alongside (Ukraine) Inga Babakova and (Cuba) Silvia Costa; 1994	Succeeded by (Ukraine) Inga Babakova
