= Olga Kaliturina =

Russian high jumper

Olga Viktorovna Kaliturina (Russian: Ольга Викторовна Калитурина, born 9 March 1976, Ryazan) is a Russian high jumper.

Her personal best jump is 1.98 metres, achieved in August 2004 in Moscow.

== Achievements ==
Year	Competition	Venue	Position	Notes
Representing Russia
1994	World Junior Championships	Lisbon, Portugal	1st	1.88 m
1997	World Championships	Athens, Greece	2nd	1.96 m
1997	Grand Prix Final	Fukuoka, Japan	7th	1.90 m
2000	European Indoor Championships	Ghent, Belgium	3rd	1.96 m
2002	European Championships	Munich, Germany	3rd	1.89 m
2003	World Championships	Paris, France	11th	1.90 m
2003	Military World Games	Catania, Italy	2nd	1.89 m

== See also ==
- List of World Athletics Championships medalists (women)
- List of high jump national champions (women)
- List of European Athletics Championships medalists (women)
- List of European Athletics Indoor Championships medalists (women)
- High jump at the World Championships in Athletics
