= Katarzyna Majchrzak =

Polish high jumper

Personal information
- Born: 25 June 1967 (age 59) Gdańsk, Pomorskie, Poland

Sport
- Sport: Track and field

Katarzyna Mirosława Majchrzak-Waśniewska (born 25 June 1967) is a former female high jumper from Poland, who represented her native country at the 1992 Summer Olympics in Barcelona, Spain. She set her personal best (1.92 m) in the women's high jump event in 1992.

== International competitions ==
Year	Competition	Venue	Position	Notes
Representing Poland
1992	Olympic Games	Barcelona, Spain	22nd (q)	1.88 m
1993	World Championships	Stuttgart, Germany	9th	1.88 m (1.90)
1994	European Championships	Helsinki, Finland	13th (q)	1.90 m
