= Lea Haggett =

English high jumper

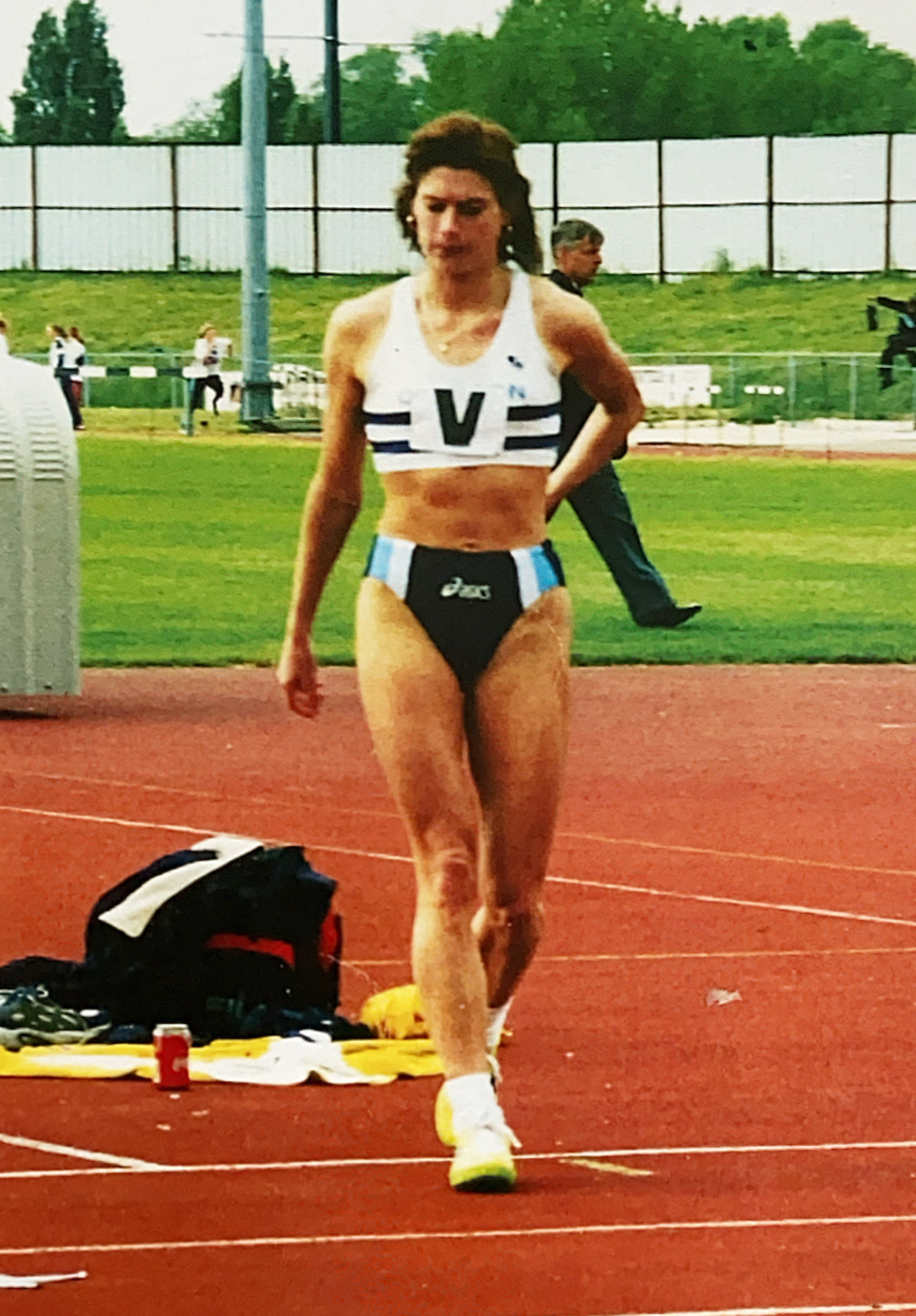
- Haggett in late 1980s

Personal information
- Nationality: British (English)
- Born: 9 May 1972 Dulwich, London, England
- Died: 31 December 2013 (aged 41)

Sport
- Sport: Athletics
- Event: high jump
- Club: Herne Hill Harriers, Croydon Harriers
Medal record
Athletics
Representing Great Britain
World Junior Championships
Bronze medal – third place	1990 Plovdiv	high jump

Lea Maureen Haggett married name Goodman (9 May 1972 - 31 December 2013) was an English high jumper. She represented Great Britain at the 1996 Olympic Games in Atlanta and won a bronze medal at the 1990 World Junior Championships in Plovdiv. She held the UK junior record for 23 years, from 1991 to 2014.

== Biography ==
Haggett was born in Dulwich, London, England, and was a member of the Croydon Harriers Athletics Club. In 1986, she cleared 1.81 metres as a 14-year-old.

In 1990, still only eighteen, Haggett was the United Kingdom's number one female high jumper, winning the 1990 AAA Championships with a personal best of 1.88 m, defeating Olympic finalist Janet Boyle. A week later at the World Junior Championships in Plovdiv, Bulgaria, she again cleared 1.88 m to win the bronze medal. She would remain the only British woman to win a medal at the World Junior Championships in the high jump until Morgan Lake won gold in 2014. She ended the season by competing at the European Championships in Split. As the only British entrant, she managed 1.80 m and was eliminated in the qualifying round.

Haggett began the 1991 season by improving her personal best to 1.91 m at a meeting in Chania, Greece on 2 June. Although she would not improve on this for the rest of the year, she had another consistent season. Also in June, she won the UK Championships title with 1.85 m. In July, she cleared 1.88 m to finish second at the AAAs Championships behind Debbie Marti. In August, she cleared 1.89 m for fourth at the European Junior Championships in Thessalonika.

In 1992, at the AAAs Championships, incorporating the Olympic trials, Haggett won her second AAAs title with 1.89 m but failed to earn Olympic selection. Her 1.91 m best from the previous year was one centimetre short of the qualifying standard.

After a year out with an injury, Haggett returned in 1994 and earned selection for both the European Championships in Helsinki and the Commonwealth Games in Victoria. At the Europeans, she managed only 1.75 m in qualification. She fared better at the Commonwealth Games, clearing 1.88 m to finish fifth in the final.

In 1995, Haggett was the UK number one for the second time, with a season's best of 1.90 m. At the AAAs Championships, she won on countback ahead of Diana Davies and Debbie Marti, to earn World Championships selection. All three cleared 1.85 m. At the World Championships in Gothenburg, she cleared 1.75 m and was eliminated in qualification.

Haggett earned Olympic selection in 1996 by achieving her lifetime best of 1.92 m at the AAAs Championships (Olympic trials) in Birmingham. She finished second to Debbie Marti who cleared 1.94. At the Atlanta Olympics, although failing to reach the final, she produced her best jump in a major championships with 1.90 m, defeating Marti, who cleared 1.85 m. Haggett and Marti were the last British women to compete in an Olympic high jump competition until Morgan Lake competed in 2016. Atlanta would prove to be Haggett's final major championships.

As of 2015, Haggett's best jump of 1.92 m from 1996 ranks her 11th on the UK all-time list. Her 1.91 m from 1991, when she was 19, stood as the UK junior record for 23 years. Susan Jones equalled the record in 1997 before Morgan Lake broke it in 2014 by clearing 1.93 m.

== International competitions ==
Year	Competition	Venue	Position	Notes
Representing Great Britain / England
1990	World Junior Championships	Plovdiv, Bulgaria	3rd	1.88 m
1990	European Championships	Split, Yugoslavia	17th (q)	1.75 m
1991	European Junior Championships	Thessalonika, Greece	4th	1.89 m
1992	European Indoor Championships	Genoa, Italy	18th	1.80 m
1994	European Championships	Helsinki, Finland	34th (q)	1.75 m
1994	Commonwealth Games	Victoria, Canada	5th	1.88 m
1995	European Cup Super League	Villeneuve-d'Ascq, France	6th	1.86 m
1995	World Championships	Gothenburg, Sweden	35th (q)	1.75 m
1996	European Cup Super League	Madrid, Spain	7th	1.84 m
1996	Olympic Games	Atlanta, United States	16th (q)	1.90 m
(q) indicates overall position in qualifying round

=== National titles ===
- AAA Championships (1990, 1992, 1995)
- UK Championships (1991)
- AAA Indoor Championships (1995)
