= Sandrine Fricot =

French high jumper

Sandrine Fricot (born 4 June 1968 in Épinal) is a retired high jumper from France, who set her personal best on 8 June 1992, jumping 1.93 metres at a meet in Belfort. She is a two-time French national champion: 1992 and 1994.

Sporting positions
Preceded by (Czechoslovakia) Jana Brenkusová	Women's French National Champion; 1992	Succeeded by (France) Maryse Maury
Preceded by (France) Maryse Maury	Women's French National Champion; 1994	Succeeded by (France) Maryse Maury
