= Tisha Waller =

American high jumper (born 1970)

Personal information
- Born: December 1, 1970 (age 55) South Boston, Virginia, United States

Sport
- Sport: Track and field
Medal record
Representing United States
World Indoor Championships
Bronze medal – third place	1999 Maebashi	High jump
Summer Universiade
Bronze medal – third place	1991 Sheffield	High jump
Goodwill Games
Gold medal – first place	1998 New York City	High jump

Tisha Felice Waller (born December 1, 1970) is an American athlete competing in the high jump, who participated in the 1996 Summer Olympics and 2004 Summer Olympics. She is a five time American Champion, and internationally won the 1998 Goodwill Games, plus bronze medals in the 1991 World University Games and the 1999 World Indoor Championships.

Born in South Boston, Virginia, Waller was raised in Decatur, Georgia. She graduated from Halifax County High School and the University of North Carolina. After graduating she became a kindergarten teacher, becoming 1996 Teacher of the year honors at Livsey Elementary School in DeKalb County, Georgia. That same year she won the United States Olympic Trials (track and field) and competed in the home town Olympics. She concentrated on High Jump, coached by Nat Page for a few years but taking the 2001 season off to finish her master's degree at Clark University and return to teaching first grade at a brand new school, Wynbrooke Traditional Theme School in Stone Mountain, Georgia. She was named USATFs Visa Humanitarian Athlete of the Year in 2003.

Waller established an American women's indoor record of 2.01 meters (6' 7.25") at the 1998 USA Indoor Championships on February 28, 1998. Her mark stood for 14 years until it was broken by Chaunté Lowe by a single centimeter, 2.02m, at the 2012 USA Indoor Championships.

== International competitions ==
Year	Competition	Venue	Position	Notes
Representing United States
1991	Universiade	Sheffield, United Kingdom	3rd	1.90 m
1995	World Indoor Championships	Barcelona, Spain	7th	1.93 m
1995	World Championships	Gothenburg, Sweden	17th (q)	1.90 m
1996	Olympic Games	Atlanta, United States	9th	1.93 m
1998	Goodwill Games	New York City, United States	1st	1.97 m
1998	World Cup	Johannesburg, South Africa	3rd	1.93 m
1999	World Indoor Championships	Maebashi, Japan	3rd	1.96 m
1999	World Championships	Seville, Spain	4th	1.96 m
2002	World Cup	Madrid, Spain	4th	1.96 m
2003	World Indoor Championships	Birmingham, United Kingdom	7th	1.96 m
2004	Olympic Games	Athens, Greece	16th (q)	1.89 m
(q) = overall position in qualifying round
