= 2012 Italian Athletics Championships =

- Dates: 6–8 July
- Host city: Brixen
- Level: Senior
- Events: 42

The 2012 Italian Athletics Championships was the 102nd edition of the Italian Athletics Championships and were held in Brixen on 6–8 July 2012.

== Champions ==
Event	Men	Performance	Women	Performance
100 m	Fabio Cerutti	10.43	Audrey Alloh	11.48
200 m	Andrew Howe	20.76	Libania Grenot	22.91
400 m	Claudio Licciardello	46.15	Maria Enrica Spacca	52.53
800 m	Giordano Benedetti	1:48.78	Marta Milani	2:05.21
1500 m	Christian Obrist	3:48.16	Elisa Cusma	4:18.04
5000 m	Stefano La Rosa	14:01.49	Silvia Weissteiner	15:50.15
110/100 m hs	Paolo Dal Molin	13.74	Marzia Caravelli	13.15
400 m hs	José Bencosme	49.33	Manuela Gentili	55.87
3000 m st	Matteo Villani	8:54.93	Valentina Costanza	10:14.22
Long jump	Fabrizio Schembri	7.67w	Tania Vicenzino	6.65w
Triple jump	Daniele Greco	17.67w	Simona La Mantia	14.24w
High jump	Gianmarco Tamberi	2.31	Chiara Vitobello	1.89
Pole vault	Claudio Stecchi	5.60	Anna Giordano Bruno	4.35
Shot put	Paolo Dal Soglio	18.70	Chiara Rosa	18.30
Discus throw	Eduardo Albertazzi	60.50	Tamara Apostolico	58.62
Hammer throw	Lorenzo Povegliano	76.29	Silvia Salis	70.18
Javelin throw	Giacomo Puccini	76.42	Zahra Bani	58.40
Decathlon/Heptathlon	William Frullani	7378	Elisa Trevisan	5574
