= Irène Tiendrébéogo =

Burkinabé-Monegasque athlete (born 1977)

Personal information
- Nationality: Burkinabé / Monegasque
- Born: 27 February 1977 (age 49) Ouagadougou, Upper Volta
- Height: 1.76 m (5 ft 9 1/2 in)
- Weight: 63 kg (139 lb)

Sport
- Sport: Track and field
- Event(s): High jump, Sprinting

Achievements and titles
- Personal best: High jump: 1.94 m (1999)
Medal record
Women's athletics
Representing Burkina Faso
All-Africa Games
Silver medal – second place	1995 Harare	High jump
Silver medal – second place	1999 Johannesburg	High jump
African Championships
Gold medal – first place	1996 Yaoundé	High jump
Silver medal – second place	1998 Dakar	High jump
Jeux de la Francophonie
Bronze medal – third place	1997 Antananarivo	High jump
African Junior Championships
Silver medal – second place	1994 Algiers	High jump
Silver medal – second place	1995 Bouaké	High jump

Irène Dimwaogdo Tiendrébéogo (born 27 February 1977) is a Burkinabé-Monegasque retired female athlete who specialised in high jump. Tiéndrebeogo competed at the 1995, 1997 and 1999 World Championships in Athletics in the Women's high jump. She also competed at the 1996 Summer Olympics in Atlanta.

== Competition record ==
Year	Competition	Venue	Position	Event	Notes
Representing Burkina Faso
1994	African Junior Championships	Algiers, Algeria	2nd	High jump	1.65 m
1995	African Junior Championships	Bouaké, Ivory Coast	2nd	High jump	1.73 m
1995	World Championships	Gothenburg, Sweden	34th (q)	High jump	1.80 m
1995	All-Africa Games	Harare, Zimbabwe	2nd	High jump	1.75 m
1996	African Championships	Yaoundé, Cameroon	1st	High jump	1.84 m
1996	Olympic Games	Atlanta, United States	29th (q)	High jump	1.80 m
1997	World Championships	Athens, Greece	—	High jump	NM
1997	Jeux de la Francophonie	Antananarivo, Madagascar	3rd	High jump	1.82 m
1998	African Championships	Dakar, Senegal	2nd	High jump	1.84 m
1999	World Championships	Seville, Spain	21st (q)	High jump	1.89 m
1999	All-Africa Games	Johannesburg, South Africa	2nd	High jump	1.85 m
Representing Monaco
2001	Games of the Small States of Europe	City of San Marino, San Marino	6th	200 m	25.40
2003	Games of the Small States of Europe	Valletta, Malta	5th	400 m	57.69
2003	Games of the Small States of Europe	Valletta, Malta	4th	4 × 400 m relay	3:57.20
