= Natalja Jonckheere =

Belgian high jumper

Personal information
- Born: 21 October 1970 (age 55) Bruges, Belgium

Sport
- Sport: Track and field
Medal record
Representing Belgium
Summer Universiade
Bronze medal – third place	1995 Fukuoka	High jump

Natalja Jonckheere (born 21 October 1970) is a retired Belgian high jumper.

She finished ninth at the 1988 World Junior Championships, tenth at the 1989 European Indoor Championships. twelfth at the 1989 World Indoor Championships, ninth at the 1995 World Indoor Championships and tenth at the 1998 European Indoor Championships. She also competed at the 1994 European Championships and the 1995 World Championships without reaching the final.

She became Belgian champion in 1988, 1991, 1994 and 1995. Her main domestic competitor was Sabrina De Leeuw. Her personal best jump is 1.95 metres, achieved in July 1995 in Norderney.
