= Sieglinde Cadusch =

Swiss high jumper

Sieglinde Cadusch (born 28 August 1967) is a retired Swiss high jumper.

She competed at the 1992 Olympic Games, 1994 European Championships, the 1995 World Championships and the 1996 Olympic Games as well as the World Indoor Championships in 1993, 1995 and 1997 without reaching the final.

Her personal best jump is 1.95 metres, achieved in September 1995 in Marietta.
