= Athletics at the 1996 Summer Olympics – Women's high jump =

Women's high jump at the Games of the XXVI Olympiad
- Pictogram for athletics
- Venue: Centennial Olympic Stadium
- Date: 1 August 1996 (qualifications); 3 August 1996 (finals)
- Competitors: 31 from 25 nations
- Winning height: 2.05 OR

Medalists
1st place, gold medalist(s)		Stefka Kostadinova; Bulgaria
2nd place, silver medalist(s)		Niki Bakogianni; Greece
3rd place, bronze medalist(s)		Inha Babakova; Ukraine

These are the official results of the Women's High Jump event at the 1996 Summer Olympics in Atlanta, Georgia. There were a total of 32 participating athletes, with two non-starters. The qualification round mark was set at 1.93 metres.

== Medalists ==
Gold	Stefka Kostadinova; Bulgaria
Silver	Niki Bakogianni; Greece
Bronze	Inha Babakova; Ukraine

== Results ==
=== Qualifying round ===
Qualification: Qualifying Performance 1.96 (Q) or at least 12 best performers (q) advance to the final.

Rank	Group	Name	Nationality	1.75	1.80	1.85	1.90	1.93	Result	Notes
1	A	Inha Babakova	Ukraine	–	–	o	o	o	1.93	q
1	A	Niki Bakogianni	Greece	–	o	o	o	o	1.93	q
DQ	A	Antonella Bevilacqua*	Italy	–	o	o	o	o	~~1.93~~	q
1	A	Yelena Gulyayeva	Russia	–	o	o	o	o	1.93	q
1	A	Stefka Kostadinova	Bulgaria	–	o	o	o	o	1.93	q
1	A	Tisha Waller	United States	o	o	o	o	o	1.93	q
1	A	Svetlana Zalevskaya	Kazakhstan	–	o	o	o	o	1.93	q
1	B	Alina Astafei	Germany	–	o	o	o	o	1.93	q
1	B	Hanne Haugland	Norway	–	o	o	o	o	1.93	q
1	B	Tatyana Motkova	Russia	o	o	o	o	o	1.93	q
1	B	Nelė Žilinskienė	Lithuania	–	o	o	o	o	1.93	q
11	B	Britta Bilač	Slovenia	–	o	o	o	xo	1.93	q
12	A	Olga Bolşova	Moldova	–	o	xo	o	xo	1.93	q
13	B	Zuzana Kováčiková	Czech Republic	o	o	xo	xo	xxo	1.93	q
14	B	Tatyana Khramova	Belarus	–	o	o	o	xxx	1.90	
15	B	Kajsa Bergqvist	Sweden	o	xo	o	o	xxx	1.90	
16	B	Lea Haggett	Great Britain	–	xo	o	xo	xxx	1.90	
17	B	Ioamnet Quintero	Cuba	–	o	o	xxo	xxx	1.90	
18	A	Connie Teaberry	United States	o	xo	o	xxo	xxx	1.90	
19	A	Sieglinde Cadusch	Switzerland	o	o	o	xxx		1.85	
19	A	Debbie Marti	Great Britain	o	o	o	xxx		1.85	
19	B	Yuliya Lyakhova	Russia	–	o	o	xxx		1.85	
19	B	Vita Styopina	Ukraine	–	o	o	xxx		1.85	
23	B	Inna Gliznuta	Moldova	o	xo	o	xxx		1.85	
24	B	Amy Acuff	United States	o	o	xo	xxx		1.85	
24	B	Alica Javadová	Slovakia	–	o	xo	xxx		1.85	
26	A	Natasha Alleyne	Trinidad and Tobago	o	xo	xxo	xxx		1.85	
27	A	Juana Arrendel	Dominican Republic	o	o	xxx			1.80	
28	A	Svetlana Munkova	Uzbekistan	o	xxo	xxx			1.80	
29	A	Irene Tiendrebeogo	Burkina Faso	xxo	xxo	xxx			1.80	
29	B	Venelina Veneva	Bulgaria	xxo	xxo	xxx			1.80	
	B	Alison Inverarity	Australia	–	–	xxx			NM	
	A	Coralea Cline	British Virgin Islands						DNS	
	A	Sigrid Kirchmann	Austria						DNS	

=== Final ===
Rank	Name	Nationality	1.80	1.85	1.90	1.93	1.96	1.99	2.01	2.03	2.05	2.10	Result	Notes
1st place, gold medalist(s)	Stefka Kostadinova	Bulgaria	–	o	o	o	o	o	o	o	xo	xxx	2.05	OR
2nd place, silver medalist(s)	Niki Bakogianni	Greece	o	o	xo	o	o	xo	xo	xxo	xxx		2.03	
3rd place, bronze medalist(s)	Inha Babakova	Ukraine	–	o	o	o	o	o	o	xxx			2.01	
DQ	Antonella Bevilacqua*	Italy	o	o	o	o	o	o	xxx				~~1.99~~	
4	Yelena Gulyayeva	Russia	–	o	o	o	xo	xo	xxx				1.99	
5	Alina Astafei	Germany	–	o	o	o	o	x–	xx				1.96	
5	Tatyana Motkova	Russia	–	o	o	o	o	x–	xx				1.96	
5	Nelė Žilinskienė	Lithuania	o	o	o	o	o	xxx					1.96	
8	Hanne Haugland	Norway	–	o	xxo	xo	o	xxx					1.96	
9	Britta Bilač	Slovenia	o	o	o	o	xxx						1.93	
9	Tisha Waller	United States	o	o	o	o	xxx						1.93	
11	Olga Bolşova	Moldova	o	o	xo	xo	xxx						1.93	
11	Zuzana Kováčiková	Czech Republic	o	xo	o	xo	xxx						1.93	
13	Svetlana Zalevskaya	Kazakhstan	o	o	xo	xxo	xxx						1.93	

* In May 1996, Antonella Bevilacqua twice tested positive for ephedrine which carried the penalty of a three-month ban. The IAAF decided to put the case to arbitration and allow her to compete in Atlanta, where she placed 4th. However, after the Olympics the IAAF decided she was guilty of a doping offence and annulled her results from May onwards, including her Olympic performance.

== See also ==
- National champions high jump (women)
- 1995 Women's World Championships High Jump
- 1997 Women's World Championships High Jump
