= Nelė Žilinskienė =

Lithuanian high jumper (born 1969)

Personal information
- Born: 29 December 1969 (age 56) Telšiai, Soviet Union

Sport
- Sport: Track and field
Medal record
Representing Lithuania
European Championships
Bronze medal – third place	1994 Helsinki	High jump
Summer Universiade
Silver medal – second place	1993 Buffalo	High jump

Nelė Žilinskienė (née Savickytė, born 29 December 1969) is a lithuanian retired female high jumper. Born in Telšiai, her personal best jump, first cleared in Vilnius in July 1994, was 1.96 metres. She again cleared this height when finishing fifth in the 1996 Olympic final.

== Achievements ==
Year	Competition	Venue	Position	Notes
Representing Lithuania
1992	Olympic Games	Barcelona, Spain	20th (q)	1.90 m
1993	World Indoor Championships	Toronto, Canada	11th	1.88 m
1993	Universiade	Buffalo, United States	2nd	1.95 m
1993	World Championships	Stuttgart, Germany	15th (q)	1.90 m
1994	European Championships	Helsinki, Finland	3rd	1.93 m
1995	World Championships	Gothenburg, Sweden	8th	1.93 m
1996	European Indoor Championships	Stockholm, Sweden	4th	1.94 m
1996	Olympic Games	Atlanta, United States	5th	1.96 m
1997	World Indoor Championships	Paris, France	6th	1.95 m
1998	Goodwill Games	Uniondale, United States	4th	1.93 m
1998	European Championships	Budapest, Hungary	16th (q)	1.87 m
1999	World Championships	Seville, Spain	17th (q)	1.89 m
2000	European Indoor Championships	Ghent, Belgium	10th (q)	1.85 m
2000	Olympic Games	Sydney, Australia	21st (q)	1.89 m
2001	World Championships	Edmonton, Canada	16th (q)	1.88 m
