= Niculina Vasile =

Romanian high jumper

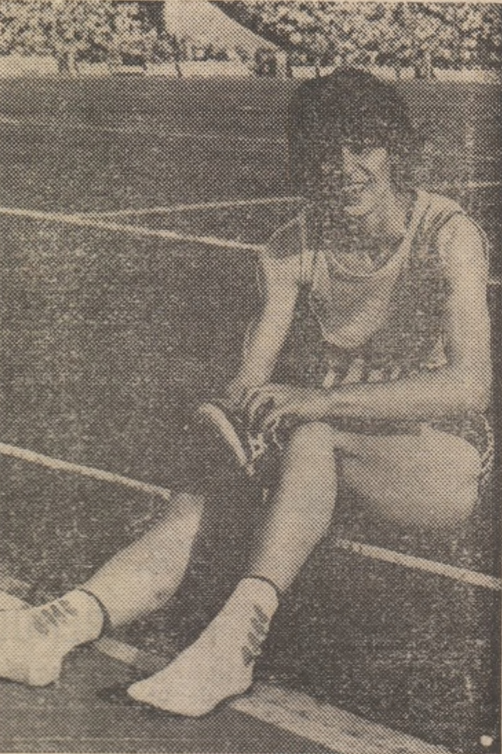
- Vasile in 1983

Personal information
- Nationality: Romanian
- Born: February 13, 1958 (age 68)

Sport
- Sport: Athletics
- Event: High Jump

Niculina Vasile (born 13 February 1958) is a retired high jumper from Romania, who set her personal best on 2 June 1985, jumping 1.98 metres at a meet in Bucharest. A three-time national champion (1981, 1982 and 1984), Vasile competed at the 1984 Summer Olympics in Los Angeles, California, where she finished in 11th place (1.85 metres).
