= Svetlana Zalevskaya =

Kazakhstani high jumper (born 1974)

Personal information
- Born: 14 June 1974 (age 52) Almaty, Soviet Union

Sport
- Sport: Track and field
Medal record
Representing Kazakhstan
Asian Games
Silver medal – second place	1994 Hiroshima	High jump
Asian Championships
Gold medal – first place	1993 Manila	High jump
Gold medal – first place	1995 Jakarta	High jump
Summer Universiade
Silver medal – second place	1995 Fukuoka	High jump
East Asian Games
Silver medal – second place	1997 Busan	High jump
Silver medal – second place	2001 Osaka	High jump

Svetlana Iosifovna Zalevskaya (Russian: Светлана Иосифовна Залевская; born 14 June 1974) is a retired female high jumper from Kazakhstan. Her personal best jump is 1.98 metres indoors on 2 March 1996 in Samara. Her outdoor best is 1.97 metres, achieved in June 1996 in Pierre-Bénite. She was born in Almaty, Soviet Kazakhstan.

== Achievements ==
Year	Competition	Venue	Position	Notes
Representing Unified Team
1992	World Junior Championships	Seoul, South Korea	2nd	1.88 m
Representing Kazakhstan
1993	Universiade	Buffalo, United States	5th	1.93 m
1993	World Championships	Stuttgart, Germany	11th	1.88 m
1993	Asian Championships	Manila, Philippines	1st	1.92 m
1994	Asian Games	Hiroshima, Japan	2nd	1.89 m
1995	World Indoor Championships	Barcelona, Spain	16th (q)	1.85 m
1995	Asian Championships	Jakarta, Indonesia	1st	1.89 m
1995	World Championships	Gothenburg, Sweden	24th (q)	1.93 m
1995	Universiade	Fukuoka, Japan	2nd	1.92 m
1996	Olympic Games	Atlanta, United States	13th	1.93 m
1997	World Indoor Championships	Paris, France	20th (q)	1.85 m
1997	East Asian Games	Busan, South Korea	2nd	1.88 m
1999	Central Asian Games	Bishkek, Kyrgyzstan	1st	1.92 m
1999	World Championships	Seville, Spain	8th	1.93 m
2000	Olympic Games	Sydney, Australia	6th	1.96 m
2001	World Indoor Championships	Lisbon, Portugal	9th	1.90 m
2001	East Asian Games	Osaka, Japan	2nd	1.90 m
2001	World Championships	Edmonton, Canada	20th (q)	1.85 m
2002	Asian Championships	Colombo, Sri Lanka	5th	1.80 m

== See also ==
- List of Maccabiah records in athletics
