= Angela McKee =

New Zealand high jumper (born 1974)

Personal information
- Born: 1 December 1974 (age 51) Henderson, New Zealand

Sport
- Country: New Zealand
- Sport: Athletics
- Event: High jump

Achievements and titles
- National finals: High jump champion (2000, 2003, 2004, 2005, 2006)
Medal record
Women's Athletics
Representing New Zealand
Commonwealth Games
Bronze medal – third place	2006 Melbourne	High Jump

Angela McKee (née Warner; born 1 December 1974) is a former high jumper for New Zealand.

At the 2006 Commonwealth Games she won a bronze medal with a jump of 1.83m.
