= Miki Imai (athlete) =

Japanese high jumper (born 1975)

Personal information
- Born: 30 May 1975 (age 51) Tokyo, Japan

Sport
- Sport: Track and field
Medal record
Representing Japan
Asian Championships
Gold medal – first place	1998 Fukuoka	High jump
Silver medal – second place	1995 Jakarta	High jump
East Asian Games
Gold medal – first place	2001 Osaka	High jump
Bronze medal – third place	1997 Busan	High jump

Miki Imai (Japanese: 今井美希; born 30 May 1975) is a Japanese former track and field athlete who competed in the high jump. Her personal best of 1.96 m (6 ft 5 in), set in 2001, is the Japanese record for the event. She is also co-holder of the indoor national record of 1.91 m (6 ft 3 in) with Megumi Sato.

She represented Japan at the 2000 Sydney Olympics and was a three-time participant at the World Championships in Athletics (1999, 2001 and 2003). Her best major global placing came at the 1999 IAAF World Indoor Championships, where she came eighth. She also made appearances at the 1998 Asian Games and the 1998 IAAF World Cup.

Imai was the 1998 Asian Champion in the high jump and holds the championship record of 1.94 m (6 ft 4 1/4 in). She was the runner-up in 1995 and fourth in 2002. She was also a two-time medallist at the East Asian Games, taking bronze in 1997 and the gold medal in 2001 (with a games record of 1.92 m (6 ft 3 1/2 in)). She was a six-time Japanese champion in the high jump.

== Career ==
Born in Tokyo, Imai won her first international medal at the 1992 Asian Junior Athletics Championships, finishing third behind Yoko Ota. After attending high school in Nagoya, she went on to study at Chukyo Women's University. She won the Japanese junior title in 1994.

She made her first impact at the top level of athletics in 1995. She won her first national title at the Japan Championships in Athletics, then was a close second to Svetlana Zalevskaya at the 1995 Asian Athletics Championships, taking the silver medal on countback. She also placed fourth at the Summer Universiade held in Fukuoka that year. Imai won three consecutive Japanese university titles from 1995 to 1997. She won her first high jump title at the National Sports Festival of Japan in 1996. At the 1997 East Asian Games she was again beaten on countback by Zalevskaya, placing third on that occasion. She represented Japan at the 1997 Universiade but was only twelfth on that occasion. Following her graduation she signed up to compete professionally with the Mizuno Track Club.

Imai broke the Japanese indoor record for the high jump in February 1998, winning in Beijing with a clearance of 1.91 m (6 ft 3 in). She edged her rival Yoko Ota to the high jump gold medal at the 1998 Asian Athletics Championships, setting a personal best and championship record of 1.94 m (6 ft 4 1/4 in) in the process. She jumped one centimetre lower at the 1998 IAAF World Cup to take fifth place for the Asian team. She was over the 1.90 m mark again at the Japanese Championships and defeated Ota to win her second national title. However, in December at the 1998 Asian Games it was Ota who topped the podium while Imai finished in joint fourth place, missing the bronze medal on countback.

In the 1999 season, she failed to reach her previous heights but performed well nevertheless. She placed eighth on her debut at the 1999 IAAF World Indoor Championships and competed in the qualifying rounds at the 1999 World Championships in Athletics (placing eleventh in her group). She won at both the Japanese Championships and National Games that year. She jumped 1.90 m (6 ft 2 3/4 in) indoors the following year and placed second at the Osaka Grand Prix with a clearance of 1.93 m (6 ft 3 3/4 in). She was beaten to the national title by Ota, but both were selected for Japan at the 2000 Sydney Olympics. Imai narrowed failed to make the Olympic high jump final, having jumped 1.92 m (6 ft 3 1/2 in) in the qualifiers.

Imai reached the peak of her career during 2001. She opened the season with a national indoor record equalling jump of 1.91 m in Stockholm. She jumped 1.92 m outdoors several times in a row, taking in a win at the Japanese championships and a games record mark for the gold medal at the 2001 East Asian Games held in Osaka. She failed to match this form at the 2001 World Championships in Athletics, recording only 1.85 m (6 ft 3/4 in) in the high jump qualifiers. She attempted but failed to clear Megumi Sato's outdoor Japanese record on four occasions that season. She finally bettered that mark – which had stood since 1987 – with a jump of 1.96 m (6 ft 5 in) at the Super Meet in Yokohama. As of January 2014, her mark of 1.96m remains the Japanese high jump record for women. She was nominated for Japanese Athlete of the Year, but was beaten to the moniker by Koji Murofushi, who won a world championship medal and set an Asian record in the hammer throw.

Her best performance of 2002 came at the national championships, but her mark of 1.92 m (6 ft 3 1/2 in) was not enough to defeat Ota. Both Imai and Ota faltered at the 2002 Asian Athletics Championships – Imai's jump of 1.80 m (5 ft 10 3/4 in) was only enough for fourth while Ota had even greater difficulties, some five centimetres back. The 2003 season was the last in which Imai managed over 1.90 m. She equalled her own indoor record for a second time at the Sparkassen Cup and had a season's best of 1.92 m at the Shizuoka International meeting. She cleared the same mark to beat Ota to the national title, but failed to have a successful jump at the 2003 World Championships in Athletics.

With both Imai and Ota entering nearing their thirties, their performances dwindled in tandem. A jump of 1.83 m (6 ft 0 in) was enough for Imai to beat her rival at the Japanese Championships, bringing Imai the sixth and final Japanese title of her career. In her last season in 2005 she jumped 1.80 m for second at the Hyogo Relays, but never matched that height after and retired in 2006. Following the end of her track and field career, she returned to her alma mater in the roles of Health Sciences Institute researcher and track jumping coach.
