= Antonella Bevilacqua =

Italian high jumper (born 1971)

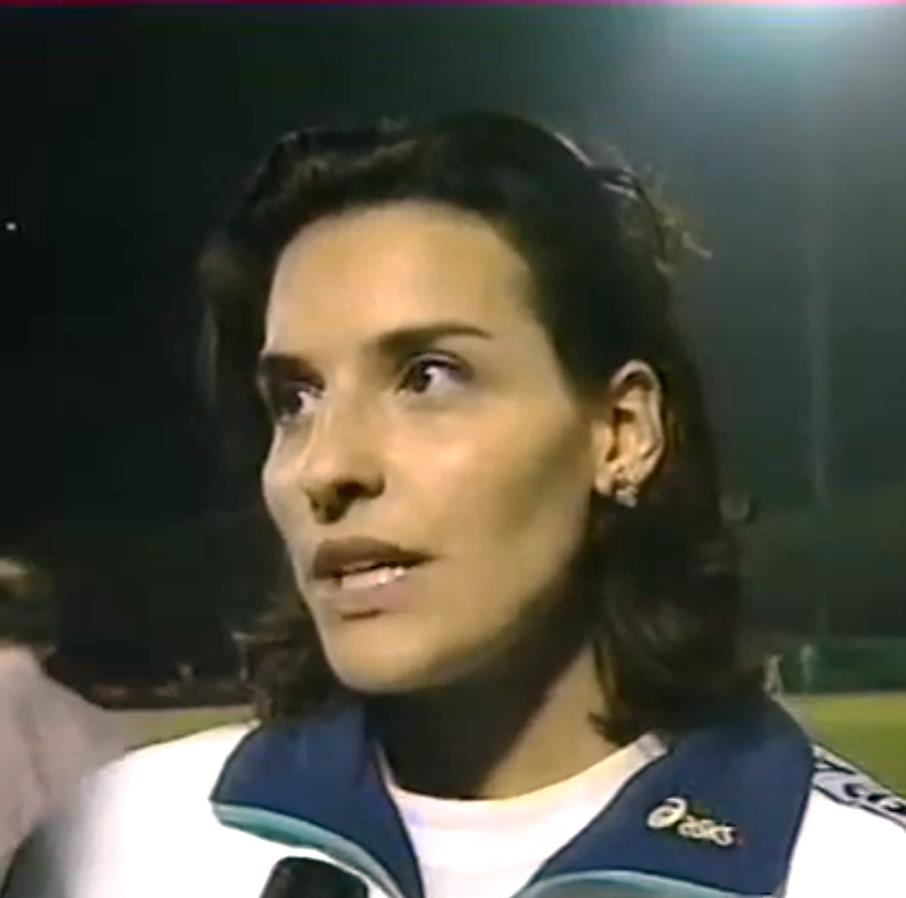
- Bevilacqua in 1996

Personal information
- National team: Italy: 29 caps (1991-2004)
- Born: 15 October 1971 (age 54) Foggia, Italy
- Height: 1.69 m (5 ft 7 in)
- Weight: 56 kg (123 lb)

Sport
- Sport: Athletics
- Event: High jump
- Club: Snam Gas Metano
- Retired: 2007

Achievements and titles
- Personal best: 1.99 m (1996) (Note: In May 1996, Antonella Bevilacqua twice tested positive for ephedrine which carried the penalty of a three-month ban. The IAAF decided to put the case to arbitration and allow her to compete in Atlanta, where she placed 4th. However, after the Olympics the IAAF decided she was guilty of a doping offence and annulled her results from May onwards, including her Olympic performance.)
Medal record
Mediterranean Games
Gold medal – first place	1997 Bari	High jump

Antonella Bevilacqua (born 15 October 1971 in Foggia) is an Italian high jumper, whose personal best jump was 1.98 metres, achieved in May 1996 in Milan.

== Biography ==
In 1996 Bevilacqua tested positive for the prohibited substances ephedrine and pseudoephedrine twice during the same month. The IAAF decided to put the case to arbitration and allowed Bevilaqua to compete at that year's Olympics where she cleared 1.99m to finish 4th. However, after the games it was decided that a doping offence had been committed and her Olympic result was annulled.

The athlete was however only disqualified for three months and was able to return to competitions already with the beginning of the 1997 indoor season in which she immediately won the national title.

== National records ==
- High jump indoor: 1.98 m ( (Greece) Athens, 24 February 1994) - record holder until 13 February 2007.

== Achievements ==
Year	Competition	Venue	Rank	Event	Measure	Notes
1989	European Junior Championships	(Socialist Federal Republic of Yugoslavia) Varaždin	5th	High jump	1.83 m	
1990	World Junior Championships	(Bulgaria) Plovdiv	8th	High jump	1.81 m	
1992	Olympic Games	(Spain) Barcelona	22nd (q)	High Jump	1.90 m	(Note: Results with a q indicate overall position in qualifying round.)
1993	World Championships	(Germany) Stuttgart	6th	High jump	1.94 m	PB
1994	European Championships	(Finland) Helsinki	19th (q)	High jump	1.85 m	
1996	Olympic Games	(United States) Atlanta	DISQ	High jump	1.99 m	(Note: Originally placed 4th but after the games it was determined that a doping offence had been committed and her Olympic result was annulled.)
1997	World Championships	(Greece) Athens	7th	High jump	1.93 m	
1997	Mediterranean Games	(Italy) Bari	1st	High jump	1.95 m	
2003	World Championships	(France) Paris	17th (q)	High jump	1.85 m	
2004	World Indoor Championships	(Hungary) Budapest	11th (q)	High jump	1.90 m	

== National titles ==
Antonella Bevilacqua has won 13 times the individual national championship.

- 6 wins in the high jump (1992, 1993, 1994, 1996, 1997, 2003)
- 7 wins in the high jump indoor (1991, 1993, 1994, 1996, 1997, 2000, 2004)

== See also ==
- Italian all-time top lists - High jump
- List of sportspeople sanctioned for doping offences
