= Eleonora Milusheva =

Bulgarian high jumper

Personal information
- Nationality: Bulgarian
- Born: 8 April 1973 (age 53)

Sport
- Sport: Athletics
- Event: High jump

Eleonora Milusheva (Bulgarian: Елеонора Милушева, born 8 April 1973) is a Bulgarian athlete. She competed in the women's high jump at the 2000 Summer Olympics.
