= Tatyana Babashkina =

Russian high jumper

Tatyana Babashkina, née Motkova (born 23 November 1968) is a retired Russian high jumper.

Her personal best jump is 2.03 metres, achieved in May 1995 in Bratislava.

== International competitions ==
Representing Russia
Year	Competition	Venue	Position	Event	Result	Notes
1995	World Championships	Gothenburg, Sweden	4th	High jump	1.96 m	
1995	Military World Games	Rome, Italy	1st	High jump	2.00 m	GR
1996	Olympic Games	Atlanta, United States	5th	High jump	1.96 m	
1997	World Championships	Athens, Greece	5th	High jump	1.93 m	

== See also ==
- List of people from Yaroslavl
