= Yelena Gulyayeva =

Russian high jumper (born 1967)

Medal record

Women's athletics

Representing Russia

European Championships
Silver medal – second place	1994 Helsinki	High jump

Yelena Gulyayeva, née Rodina (born 14 August 1967 in Moscow) is a retired Russian high jumper. Her personal best jump is 2.01 metres, achieved in May 1998 in Kalamata. She gave a positive drugs test at the 1991 European Cup, and was suspended for two years.

== Achievements ==
Year	Competition	Venue	Position	Event	Notes
Representing the Soviet Union
1991	World Indoor Championships	Seville, Spain	6th	High jump	1.88 m
Representing Russia
1993	World Championships	Stuttgart, Germany	4th	High jump	1.94 m
1994	European Championships	Helsinki, Finland	2nd	High jump	1.96 m
1995	World Indoor Championships	Barcelona, Spain	5th	High jump	1.96 m
1996	Olympic Games	Atlanta, United States	4th	High jump	1.99 m
1998	European Indoor Championships	Valencia, Spain	4th	High jump	1.92 m
1998	European Championships	Budapest, Hungary	6th	High jump	1.92 m
1999	World Championships	Seville, Spain	12th	High jump	1.93 m
2001	World Indoor Championships	Lisbon, Portugal	11th	High jump	1.90 m
2001	World Championships	Edmonton, Canada	10th	High jump	1.90 m

== See also ==
- List of sportspeople sanctioned for doping offences
