= Alison Inverarity =

Australian high jumper (born 1970)

Personal information
- Born: 12 August 1970 (age 56) Perth, Western Australia, Australia

Sport
- Sport: Track and field
Medal record
Representing Australia
Commonwealth Games
Gold medal – first place	1994 Victoria	High jump
Bronze medal – third place	1998 Kuala Lumpur	High jump
Summer Universiade
Gold medal – first place	1991 Sheffield	High jump

Alison Jane Inverarity (born 12 August 1970) is an Australian former athlete, competing in the high jump. She was affiliated with the Western Australian Institute of Sport in Perth.

She was the Australian record holder with her jump of 1.98 m (6 ft 5 3/4 in) in 1994 (tying Vanessa Browne-Ward's 1989 mark). This record stood until February 2020.

Inverarity competed at three Olympic Games, two Commonwealth Games and two World Championships. She won a gold medal at the 1994 Commonwealth Games.

== Personal ==
Inverarity was born on 12 August 1970 in Perth, Western Australia. She is the daughter of the former Australian test cricketer John Inverarity.

== National titles ==
- 8 times Australian high jump champion: 1991, 1993–95, 1997–2000

== International competitions ==
Year	Competition	Venue	Position	Event	Notes
Representing Australia
1991	World Championships	Tokyo, Japan	11th	High jump	1.87 m
1991	Summer Universiade	Sheffield, England	1st	High jump	1.92 m
1992	Olympic Games	Barcelona, Spain	8th	High jump	1.91 m
1993	World Indoor Championships	Toronto, Ontario, Canada	5th	High jump	1.97 m
1994	Commonwealth Games	Victoria, Canada	1st	High jump	1.94 m
1994	World Cup	London, England	7th	High jump	1.85 m
1995	World Championships	Gothenburg, Sweden	24th	High jump	1.85 m
1996	Olympic Games	Atlanta, Georgia	—	High jump	NM
1998	Commonwealth Games	Kuala Lumpur, Malaysia	3rd	High jump	1.88 m
1998	World Cup	Johannesburg, South Africa	7th	High jump	1.85 m
2000	Olympic Games	Sydney, Australia	32nd	High jump	1.80 m
