= Sabrina De Leeuw =

Belgian high jumper

Sabrina De Leeuw (born 19 August 1974) is a retired Belgian high jumper.

She won the 1993 European Junior Championships, and the gold medal at the 1997 Jeux de la Francophonie, She also competed at the 1993 World Championships without reaching the final. She was given the Golden Spike Award in 1993.

She became Belgian champion in 1992, 1993, 1996, 1997, 1999, 2001, 2004, 2006, 2007 and 2008. Her main domestic competitor was Natalja Jonckheere, before Tia Hellebaut took over the hegemony. De Leeuw also became French champion in 1998 and 2000. Her personal best jump is 1.9 metres (6 ft 3 in), achieved in August 1993 in Sheffield.
