= Deanne Wilson =

American high jumper

Personal information
- Nationality: American
- Born: April 30, 1955 (age 71)

Sport
- Sport: Athletics
- Event: High jump

Deanne Wilson (born April 30, 1955) is an American athlete. She competed in the women's high jump at the 1972 Summer Olympics.
