= Debbie Marti =

English high jumper (born 1968)

Personal information
- Nationality: British (English)
- Born: 14 May 1968 (age 58) Zofingen, Aargau, Switzerland
- Height: 173 cm (5 ft 8 in)
- Weight: 51 kg (112 lb)

Sport
- Sport: Athletics
- Event: High jump
- Club: Bromley Ladies
Medal record
Women's athletics
Representing England
Commonwealth Games
Bronze medal – third place	1994 Victoria	High jump
Representing Great Britain
European Junior Championships
Bronze medal – third place	1983 Schwechat	High jump

Deborah Jane Marti (born 14 May 1968) is a former high jumper from England, who was born in Switzerland. She represented Great Britain at the Olympic Games in Barcelona 1992 and Atlanta 1996, finishing ninth in the 1992 final. She set her outdoor personal best of 1.94 metres on 9 June 1996 at a meet in Tallinn. On 23 February 1997 in Birmingham, she cleared 1.95 metres to set a British indoor record, which stood for 17 years (1997–2014). She also won bronze medals at the 1983 European Junior Championships and the 1994 Commonwealth Games.

== Career ==
Marti was born in Zofingen, Aargau, Switzerland and from the age of two, was raised in England. She was a member of Bromley Ladies Athletics Club. A prodigious talent, Marti cleared 1.81 m at the age of fourteen in 1982 before achieving 1.88 m at 15 in 1983 to win a European Junior Championships bronze medal. This still stands as the UK's age 15 best. The following year, she improved to 1.89 m and was unlucky not to earn selection for the 1984 Olympic Games. Her 1.89 m stood as a UK Under 17 record for 29 years until Morgan Lake cleared 1.90 m in 2013.

Marti's career was then slowed by the debilitating illness ME. She withdrew from the 1985 World Indoor Games. In 1986, she finished ninth in the final of the World Junior Championships. From 1985 – 1990, her best result was 1.86 m.

Marti returned to top form in 1991, when she improved her 6 1/2-year-old PB to 1.94 during the indoor season, to equal Diana Davies's UK indoor record. She went on to clear 1.91 m to finish a fine fifth in the final at the World Indoor Championships in Seville. At the 1991 World Championships in Tokyo, she failed to reach the final, clearing 1.86 m in the qualifying round. In 1992, she competed at her first Olympic Games in Barcelona, where she achieved an outdoor PB of 1.92 m in the qualifying round before clearing 1.91 m for ninth in the final. She remained the last British woman to reach an Olympic high jump final until Morgan Lake qualified for the 2016 final in Rio. Shortly after the 1992 Games, she improved her outdoor best to 1.93 m.

Marti would continue as the UK's most consistent jumper for several years, although she was forced to withdraw from the 1993 World Championships due to injury. In 1994, she cleared 1.91 m to win a bronze medal at the Commonwealth Games in Victoria, Canada. In 1996, she achieved her lifetime outdoor best of 1. 94 m. She cleared this height in both Tallinn in June and again in Birmingham in July, at the British Olympic Trials. At the Atlanta Olympics, she failed to reach the final with a best of 1.85 m, for 19th overall in qualification.

Marti reached her peak indoors in 1997, by clearing 1.95 m at the Birmingham indoor Grand Prix, to add one centimetre to the UK indoor record that she held jointly with Diana Davies and Jo Jennings. This height was also equal to the UK outdoor record. The record stood for 17 years, until Katarina Johnson-Thompson cleared 1.96 m on 8 February 2014. Also, that year she reached the World Indoor Championship final in Paris and competed at the World Championships in Athens.

After a few low-key years, Marti concluded her international career by finishing sixth at the 2002 Commonwealth Games in Manchester.

== National titles ==
- 4 AAA Championships (1991, 1993, 1996, 1997) 2nd (1994, 2002)
- 3 UK Championships (1992, 1993, 1997) 2nd (1990, 1991)
- 3 AAA Indoor Championships (1991, 1992, 1997) 2nd (1984, 1989, 1993, 1995, 1996, 1998, 1999)

== International competitions ==
Year	Competition	Venue	Position	Notes
Representing Great Britain / England
1983	European Junior Championships	Schwechat, Austria	3rd	1.88 m
1986	World Junior Championships	Athens, Greece	9th	1.75 m (1.82)
1991	World Indoor Championships	Seville, Spain	5th	1.91 m
1991	European Cup	Frankfurt, Germany	4th	1.90 m
1991	World Championships	Tokyo, Japan	14th (q)	1.86 m
1992	European Indoor Championships	Genoa, Italy	18th	1.80 m
1992	Olympic Games	Barcelona, Spain	9th	1.91 m (1.92)
1993	World Indoor Championships	Toronto, Canada	22nd (q)	1.79 m
1993	World Championships	Stuttgart, Germany	dns	—
1994	European Championships	Helsinki, Finland	29th (q)	1.85 m
1994	Commonwealth Games	Victoria, Canada	3rd	1.91 m
1994	World Cup	London, England	6th	1.85 m
1996	European Indoor Championships	Stockholm, Sweden	17th	1.80 m
1996	Olympic Games	Atlanta, United States	19th (q)	1.85 m
1997	World Indoor Championships	Paris, France	13th	1.85 m (1.90)
1997	European Cup	Munich, Germany	6th	1.84 m
1997	World Championships	Athens, Greece	19th (q)	1.89 m
1998	European Indoor Championships	Valencia, Spain	9th	1.85 m
2002	Commonwealth Games	Manchester, United Kingdom	6th	1.79 m
(q) Indicates overall position in qualifying round (#) Indicates height achieved in qualifying round (dns) = did not start
