= Tatyana Khramova =

Belarusian high jumper

Personal information
- Nationality: Belarusian
- Born: 1 February 1970 (age 56)

Sport
- Sport: Athletics
- Event: High jump

Tatyana Khramova (born 1 February 1970) is a Belarusian athlete. She competed in the women's high jump at the 1996 Summer Olympics.
