= Olga Bolșova =

Moldovan high and triple jumper (born 1968)

Personal information
- Born: 16 June 1968 (age 58) Chișinău, Soviet Union

Sport
- Sport: Track and field
Medal record
Representing Moldova
European Indoor Championships
Bronze medal – third place	1996 Stockholm	High jump

Olga Bolșova (also written Olga Bolshova; born 16 June 1968) is a retired Moldovan athlete who specialized in the high jump and triple jump.

Her personal best high jump is 1.97 metres, achieved in September 1993 in Rieti. Her personal best triple jump is 14.24 metres, achieved in June 2003 in Alcalá de Henares. Both results are still Moldovan national records.

Her daughter is professional tennis player Aliona Bolsova.

== Achievements ==
Year	Competition	Venue	Position	Event	Notes
Representing the Soviet Union
1986	World Junior Championships	Athens, Greece	13th (q)	High jump	1.74 m
Representing Moldova
1994	European Championships	Helsinki, Finland	13th (q)	High jump	1.90 m
1996	European Indoor Championships	Stockholm, Sweden	3rd	High jump	1.94 m
1996	Olympic Games	Atlanta, United States	12th	High jump	1.93 m
1997	World Indoor Championships	Paris, France	9th	High jump	1.90 m
2001	World Indoor Championships	Lisbon, Portugal	4th	Triple jump	14.17 m
2001	World Championships	Edmonton, Canada	9th	Triple jump	13.86 m
2002	European Championships	Munich, Germany	9th	Triple jump	14.03 m
