= Niki Bakoyianni =

Greek high jumper (born 1968)

Niki Bakogianni
Personal information
- Born: 9 June 1968 (age 58) Lamia, Sterea Ellada, Greece
- Height: 170 cm (5 ft 7 in)
- Weight: 52 kg (115 lb)
Medal record
Women's athletics
Representing Greece
Olympic Games
| Silver medal – second place | 1996 Atlanta | High jump |
European Indoor Championships
| Silver medal – second place | 1996 Stockholm | High jump |

Niki Bakoyianni (Greek: Νίκη Μπακογιάννη, [ˈnici bakoˈʝani], born 9 June 1968) is a retired Greek high jumper. She was born in Lamia.

== Biography ==
She is best known for winning a silver medal at the 1996 Summer Olympics after a tough competition with Stefka Kostadinova, who eventually became Olympic champion. This was Bakogianni's second silver medal that year, as she had placed second in the European Indoor Championships.

Bakogianni had several honours in minor athletics competitions, such as the Mediterranean Games and the Balkan Games. She won the gold medal in the latter three times (1990 in Istanbul, 1992 in Sofia and 1994 in Trikala).

Her personal best jump of 2.03 metres is the current Greek record.

She was named the Greek Female Athlete of the Year for 1989 and 1996.

After retiring she has worked as a coach. She coaches high jumper Konstadinos Baniotis.

== Achievements ==
| Year | Competition | Venue | Position | Notes |
Representing Greece
| 1985 | European Junior Championships | Cottbus, East Germany | 14th (q) | 1.75 m |
| 1986 | World Junior Championships | Athens, Greece | 5th | 1.83 m |
| 1987 | Mediterranean Games | Latakia, Syria | 3rd | 1.84 m |
| 1990 | European Indoor Championships | Glasgow, Scotland | 8th | 1.88 m |
| 1990 | European Championships | Split, Yugoslavia | 13th (q) | 1.84 m |
| 1991 | World Indoor Championships | Seville, Spain | 25th (q) | 1.75 m |
| 1991 | Mediterranean Games | Athens, Greece | 3rd | 1.87 m |
| 1992 | European Indoor Championships | Genoa, Italy | =5th | 1.88 m |
| 1992 | Olympic Games | Barcelona, Spain | 24th (q) | 1.88 m |
| 1993 | World Indoor Championships | Toronto, Canada | 20th (q) | 1.86 m |
| 1993 | World Championships | Stuttgart, Germany | 30th (q) | 1.84 m |
| 1994 | European Indoor Championships | Paris, France | 13th (q) | 1.87 m |
| 1994 | European Championships | Helsinki, Finland | 30th (q) | 1.80 m |
| 1995 | World Indoor Championships | Barcelona, Spain | 27th (q) | 1.80 m |
| 1996 | European Indoor Championships | Stockholm, Sweden | 2nd | 1.96 m (NR) |
| 1996 | Olympic Games | Atlanta, United States | 2nd | 2.03 m (NR) |
| 1997 | Mediterranean Games | Bari, Italy | 2nd | 1.93 m |
| 1997 | World Championships | Athens, Greece | 14th (q) | 1.92 m |
| 1999 | World Championships | Seville, Spain | 28th (q) | 1.85 m |
| 2000 | Olympic Games | Sydney, Australia | 33rd (q) | 1.80 m |

Note: Results with a Q, indicate overall position in qualifying round.

== See also ==
- High Jump Differentials - Women
