= Zuzana Hlavoňová =

Czech high jumper

Personal information
- Born: 16 April 1973 (age 53) Šaľa, Czechoslovakia

Sport
- Sport: Track and field
Medal record
Representing Czech Republic
World Indoor Championships
Silver medal – second place	1999 Maebashi	High jump
European Indoor Championships
Silver medal – second place	2000 Ghent	High jump

Zuzana Hlavoňová (née Kováčiková Czech pronunciation: [ˈzuzana ˈɦlavoɲovaː ˈkovaːtʃɪkovaː], born 16 April 1973) is a Czech Republic former high jumper. Born in Šaľa, Czechoslovakia, she competed at three Olympic Games, and won silver medals at the 1999 World Indoor Championships and the 2000 European Indoor Championships. Her personal best jump is 2.00 metres, achieved in June 2000 in Prague.

== Achievements ==
Year	Competition	Venue	Position	Notes
Representing Czechoslovakia
1992	World Junior Championships	Seoul, South Korea	12th	1.81 m
Representing Czech Republic
1994	European Championships	Helsinki, Finland	11th	1.85 m (1.90)
1995	World Championships	Gothenburg, Sweden	24th (q)	1.85 m
1996	Olympic Games	Atlanta, United States	11th	1.93 m
1997	World Championships	Athens, Greece	20th (q)	1.85 m
1997	Universiade	Catania, Italy	6th	1.91 m
1998	European Championships	Budapest, Hungary	11th	1.85 m (1.90)
1999	World Indoor Championships	Maebashi, Japan	2nd	1.96 m
1999	World Championships	Seville, Spain	4th	1.96 m
2000	European Indoor Championships	Ghent, Belgium	2nd	1.98 m
2000	Olympic Games	Sydney, Australia	11th	1.90 m (1.94)
2004	World Indoor Championships	Birmingham, United Kingdom	15th (q)	1.86 m
2004	Olympic Games	Athens, Greece	26th (q)	1.85 m

Notes:

- (q) indicates overall position in qualifying round
- (#) indicates height achieved in qualifying round. Only shown if superior to height reached in final.
