= 2000 World Junior Championships in Athletics – Women's high jump =

The women's high jump event at the 2000 World Junior Championships in Athletics was held in Santiago, Chile, at Estadio Nacional Julio Martínez Prádanos on 19 and 20 October.

== Medalists ==
Gold	Blanka Vlašić; Croatia
Silver	Marina Kuptsova; Russia
Bronze	Marizca Gertenbach; South Africa

== Results ==
=== Final ===
20 October

Rank	Name	Nationality	Result	Notes
1st place, gold medalist(s)	Blanka Vlašić	Croatia	1.91	
2nd place, silver medalist(s)	Marina Kuptsova	Russia	1.88	
3rd place, bronze medalist(s)	Marizca Gertenbach	South Africa	1.88	
4	Anna Chicherova	Russia	1.85	
5	Melanie Skotnik	Germany	1.85	
6	Katja Schötz	Germany	1.85	
7	Petrina Price	Australia	1.80	
8	Nicolize Steyn	South Africa	1.80	
9	Barbora Laláková	Czech Republic	1.80	
9	Christelle Préau	France	1.80	
9	Aileen Wilson	United Kingdom	1.80	
9	Marina Korzhova	Kazakhstan	1.80	
13	Ramona Pop	Romania	1.80	
	Sheree Francis	Jamaica	NH	

=== Qualifications ===
19 October

==== Group A ====
Rank	Name	Nationality	Result	Notes
1	Blanka Vlašić	Croatia	1.83	q
1	Anna Chicherova	Russia	1.83	q
3	Katja Schötz	Germany	1.83	q
3	Ramona Pop	Romania	1.83	q
5	Marizca Gertenbach	South Africa	1.83	q
6	Hanna Mikkonen	Finland	1.80	
6	Anna Ksok	Poland	1.80	
8	Renáta Medgyesová	Slovakia	1.80	
9	Rebecca Jones	United Kingdom	1.75	
9	Bernadett Balogh	Hungary	1.75	
11	Gaëlle Niaré	France	1.75	
12	Kerstin Weiss	Chile	1.70	
	Katharine Spalding	Australia	NH	

==== Group B ====
Rank	Name	Nationality	Result	Notes
1	Aileen Wilson	United Kingdom	1.83	q
1	Marina Korzhova	Kazakhstan	1.83	q
1	Marina Kuptsova	Russia	1.83	q
4	Sheree Francis	Jamaica	1.83	q
5	Barbora Laláková	Czech Republic	1.83	q
6	Christelle Préau	France	1.83	q
6	Melanie Skotnik	Germany	1.83	q
8	Petrina Price	Australia	1.83	q
8	Nicolize Steyn	South Africa	1.83	q
10	Jorgelina Rodríguez	Argentina	1.80	
11	Lu Jieming	China	1.80	
12	Yelena Holosha	Ukraine	1.75	
13	Jenny Isgren	Sweden	1.75	
13	Hyleas Fountain	United States	1.75	

== Participation ==
According to an unofficial count, 27 athletes from 21 countries participated in the event.

- Argentina (1)
- Australia (2)
- Chile (1)
- China (1)
- Croatia (1)
- Czech Republic (1)
- Finland (1)
- France (2)
- Germany (2)
- Hungary (1)
- Jamaica (1)
- Kazakhstan (1)
- Poland (1)
- Romania (1)
- Russia (2)
- Slovakia (1)
- South Africa (2)
- Sweden (1)
- Ukraine (1)
- United Kingdom (2)
- United States (1)
