= European Athlete of the Month =

Monthly athletic recognition

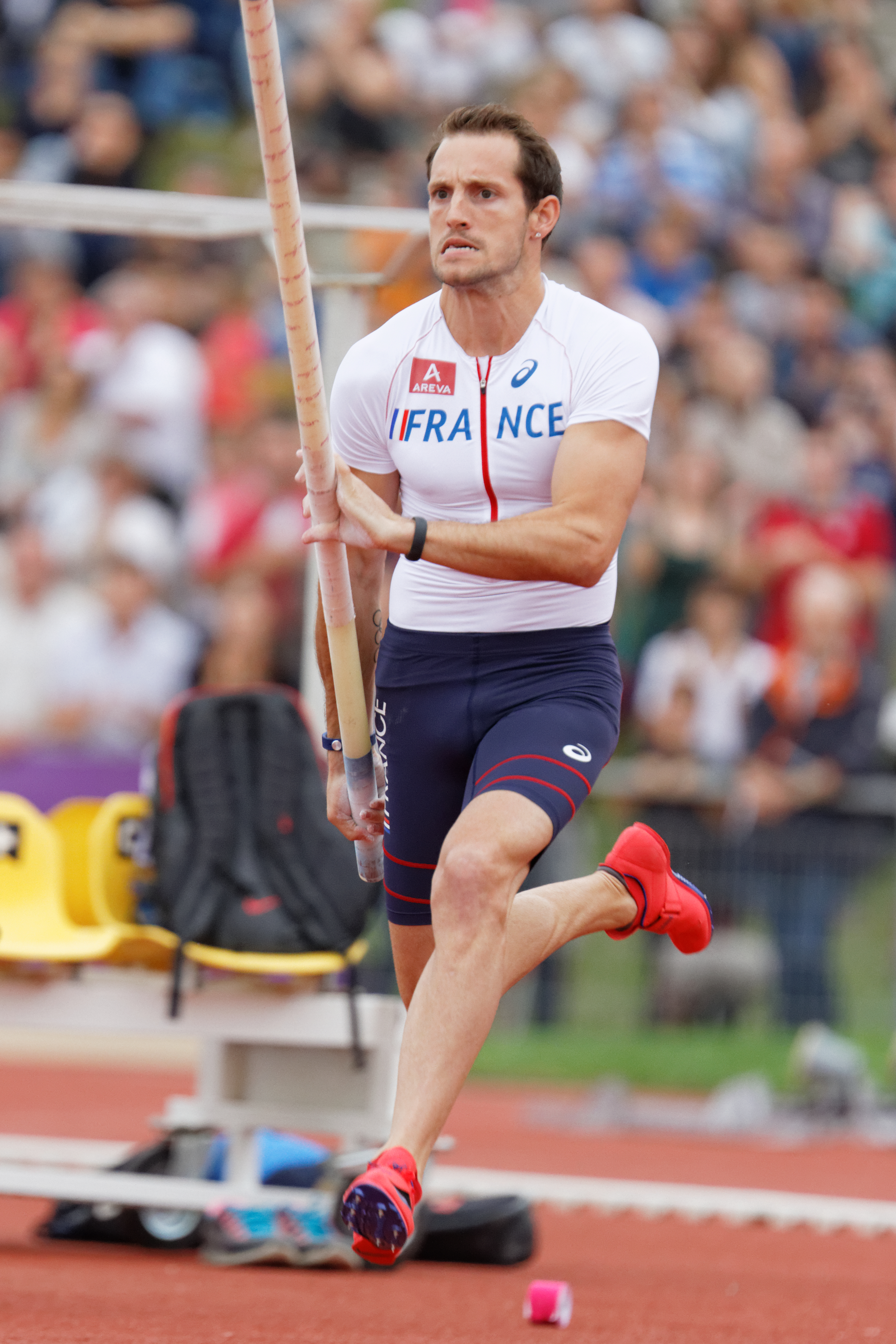
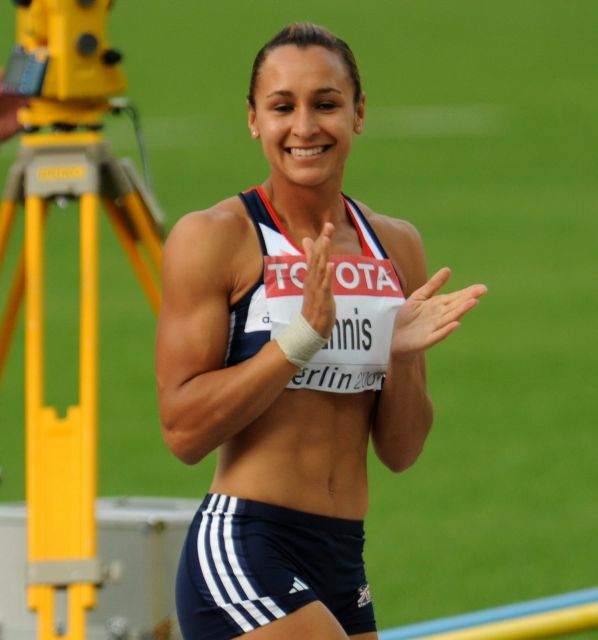
The French Renaud Lavillenie with 11, and British Jessica Ennis with seven times, are the multiwinners of the award.

The European Athlete of the Month is an award that can be won by athletes participating in events within the sport of athletics organised by the European Athletic Association (EAA). The election has been organised since 2007.

== Winners ==
2026
Month	Men	Women
January	not assigned	
February	(Greece) Emmanouil Karalis	(United Kingdom) Keely Hodgkinson
March	(Switzerland) Simon Ehammer	(United Kingdom) Keely Hodgkinson
April	(France) Jimmy Gressier	(Slovenia) Klara Lukan
May	(Switzerland) Simon Ehammer	(Poland) Elżbieta Glinka
June	(Slovenia) Kristjan Čeh	(Switzerland) Audrey Werro
July	(United Kingdom) Josh Kerr	(Czech Republic) Linda Botková
August	(Greece) Miltiadis Tentoglou	(United Kingdom) Amy Hunt
September	(Italy) Gianmarco Tamberi	(Poland) Klaudia Kazimierska
October	(France) Meziane Benhammou	(Belgium) Jana Van Lent
November		
December		

2023
Month	Men	Women
January	(Belgium) Tibo De Smet	(Poland) Pia Skrzyszowska
February		
March	(Norway) Jakob Ingebrigtsen	(Belgium) Nafissatou Thiam
April	(Lithuania) Mykolas Alekna	(Republic of Ireland) Rhasidat Adeleke
May	(Spain) Álvaro Martín	(Spain) María Pérez
June		
July		
August		
September		
October	(Spain) Carlos Mayo	(Netherlands) Sifan Hassan
November		
December		

2022
Month	Men	Women
January	(Switzerland) Simon Ehammer	(Poland) Adrianna Sułek
February	(Norway) Jakob Ingebrigtsen	(Poland) Ewa Swoboda
March	(Greece) Miltiadis Tentoglou	(Ukraine) Yaroslava Mahuchikh
April	(Italy) Yemaneberhan Crippa	(United Kingdom) Eilish McColgan
May	(Switzerland) Simon Ehammer	(United Kingdom) Eilish McColgan
June	(Sweden) Armand Duplantis	(Netherlands) Femke Bol
July	(Sweden) Armand Duplantis	(Poland) Katarzyna Zdziebło
August	(Greece) Miltiadis Tentoglou	(Greece) Antigoni Drisbioti
September		
October	(France) Yann Schrub	(Germany) Konstanze Klosterhalfen
November	(Serbia) Elzan Bibić	(United Kingdom) Eilish McColgan
December	(Norway) Jakob Ingebrigtsen	(Italy) Nadia Battocletti

2021
Month	Men	Women
January	(France) Renaud Lavillenie	(Ukraine) Yaroslava Mahuchikh
February	(Italy) Gianmarco Tamberi	(Italy) Larissa Iapichino
March	(Italy) Marcell Jacobs	(Switzerland) Ajla Del Ponte
April	(Estonia) Karel Tilga	(United Kingdom) Beth Potter
May	(Germany) Johannes Vetter	(Poland) Maria Andrejczyk
June	(Germany) Johannes Vetter	(Netherlands) Femke Bol
July		
August		
September	(Sweden) Armand Duplantis	(Authorised Neutral Athletes) Mariya Lasitskene
October	(Belgium) Bashir Abdi	(United Kingdom) Eilish McColgan
November	(Italy) Eyob Faniel	(Germany) Konstanze Klosterhalfen
December	(Norway) Jakob Ingebrigtsen	(Italy) Nadia Battocletti

2020
Month	Men	Women
January	(Switzerland) Julien Wanders	(Albania) Luiza Gega
February	(Sweden) Armand Duplantis	(Germany) Konstanze Klosterhalfen
March	(France) Renaud Lavillenie	(Belgium) Nafissatou Thiam
April	Not assigned	
May	Not assigned	
June	Not assigned	
July	(Hungary) Bence Halász	(Slovenia) Maruša Mišmaš
August	(Norway) Karsten Warholm	(Switzerland) Ajla Del Ponte
September	(Germany) Johannes Vetter	(Netherlands) Femke Bol
October	(Slovakia) Matej Tóth	(Norway) Karoline Bjerkeli Grøvdal
November		
December		

2019
Month	Men	Women
January	(Norway) Karsten Warholm	(Germany) Pamela Dutkiewicz
February	(Norway) Jakob Ingebrigtsen	(Poland) Ewa Swoboda
March	(Spain) Jorge Urena	(Spain) Ana Peleteiro
April	(Sweden) Armand Duplantis	(Portugal) Carla Salome Rocha
May	(Norway) Karsten Warholm	(Israel) Lonah Chemtai Salpeter
June	(Estonia) Magnus Kirt	(Belgium) Nafissatou Thiam
July	(Norway) Jakob Ingebrigtsen	(Denmark) Anna Emilie Møller
August	(Norway) Karsten Warholm	(Germany) Konstanze Klosterhalfen
August	not assigned	
October	(Norway) Jakob Ingebrigtsen	(United Kingdom) Katarina Johnson-Thompson
November	(Spain) Ouassim Oumaiz	(Portugal) Mariana Machado
December	(Norway) Jakob Ingebrigtsen	(Italy) Nadia Battocletti

2018
Month	Men	Women
January	(Norway) Karsten Warholm	(Republic of Ireland) Phil Healy
February	(Switzerland) Julien Wanders	(Serbia) Ivana Spanovic
March	(Germany) Johannes Vetter	(Hungary) Anita Márton
April	(Estonia) Maicel Uibo	(United Kingdom) Dina Asher-Smith
May	(Norway) Karsten Warholm	(Israel) Lonah Chemtai Salpeter
June	(Germany) Andreas Hofmann	(United Kingdom) Dina Asher-Smith
July	(Estonia) Magnus Kirt	(United Kingdom) Lorraine Ugen
August	(Belgium) Koen Naert	(Greece) Katerina Stefanidi
September	not assigned	
October	(France) Baptiste Thiery	(Greece) Elina Tzengko
November	(Italy) Yemaneberhan Crippa	(Denmark) Anna Emilie Møller
December	(Norway) Jakob Ingebrigtsen	(Portugal) Ana Dulce Felix

2017
Month	Men	Women
January	(Poland) Piotr Lisek	(Lithuania) Airinė Palšytė
February	not assigned	
March	not assigned	
April	(Sweden) Armand Duplantis	(Norway) Amalie Iuel
May	(Germany) Thomas Röhler	(Belgium) Nafissatou Thiam
June	(Norway) Karsten Warholm	(Greece) Katerina Stefanidi
July	(Norway) Jakob Ingebrigtsen	(Croatia) Sara Kolak
August	(Turkey) Ramil Guliyev	(Greece) Katerina Stefanidi
September	not assigned	
October	(United Kingdom) Dewi Griffiths	(Norway) Karoline Bjerkeli Grøvdal
November	(Belgium) Soufiane Bouchikhi	(United Kingdom) Eilish McColgan
December	(Norway) Sondre Nordstad Moen	(United Kingdom) Harriet Knowles-Jones

2016
Month	Men	Women
January	(Poland) Konrad Bukowiecki	(Poland) Ewa Swoboda
February	(Italy) Gianmarco Tamberi	(Netherlands) Dafne Schippers
March	(Italy) Gianmarco Tamberi	(Serbia) Ivana Španović
April	(Estonia) Karl Robert Saluri	(Italy) Eleonora Giorgi
May	(Germany) Thomas Röhler	(Netherlands) Dafne Schippers
June	(Germany) Thomas Röhler	(United Kingdom) Jessica Ennis-Hill
July	(Italy) Gianmarco Tamberi	(Croatia) Sandra Perković
August	(France) Kévin Mayer	(Greece) Ekaterini Stefanidi
September	(France) Renaud Lavillenie	(Serbia) Ivana Španović
October	not assigned	
November	not assigned	
December	(Norway) Jakob Ingebrigtsen	(Poland) Sofia Ennaoui

2015
Month	Men	Women
January	(Spain) Eusebio Cáceres	(Poland) Kamila Lićwinko
February	(France) Renaud Lavillenie	(Netherlands) Sifan Hassan
March	(France) Yohann Diniz	(Serbia) Ivana Španović
April	(Republic of Ireland) Thomas Barr	(Greece) Ekaterini Stefanidi
May	(France) Renaud Lavillenie	(Netherlands) Dafne Schippers
June	(Greece) Lykourgos-Stefanos Tsakonas	(Spain) Ruth Beitia
July	(Bosnia and Herzegovina) Amel Tuka	(Czech Republic) Zuzana Hejnová
August	(Poland) Paweł Fajdek	(Netherlands) Dafne Schippers
September	not assigned	
October	(Germany) Arne Gabius	(United Kingdom) Jo Pavey
November	(Spain) Carlos Mayo	(Portugal) Sara Moreira
December	(United Kingdom) Jonathan Davies	(Belgium) Louise Carton

2014
Month	Men	Women
January	(France) Renaud Lavillenie	(Netherlands) Nadine Broersen
February	(France) Renaud Lavillenie	(Ukraine) Olha Saladuha
March	(Czech Republic) Pavel Maslák	(Croatia) Sandra Perković
April	(Lithuania) Virgilijus Alekna	(Portugal) Jéssica Augusto
May	(Russia) Ivan Ukhov	(Russia) Darya Klishina
June	(Ukraine) Bohdan Bondarenko	(Czech Republic) Barbora Špotáková
July	(France) Pascal Martinot-Lagarde	(Netherlands) Dafne Schippers
August	not assigned	
September	(Estonia) Gerd Kanter	(Czech Republic) Barbora Špotáková
October	(Germany) Arne Gabius	(Italy) Valeria Straneo
November	(Ukraine) Serhiy Lebid	(Portugal) Sara Moreira
December	(Italy) Yemaneberhan Crippa	(United Kingdom) Gemma Steel

2013
Month	Men	Women
January	(France) Renaud Lavillenie	(Italy) Alessia Trost
February	(France) Renaud Lavillenie	(Turkey) Nevin Yanıt
March	(Finland) Tero Pitkämäki	(Republic of Ireland) Fionnuala Britton
April	(Estonia) Maicel Uibo	(Croatia) Lisa Stublić
May	(Ukraine) Bohdan Bondarenko	(Czech Republic) Zuzana Hejnová
June	(Ukraine) Bohdan Bondarenko	(Bulgaria) Ivet Lalova
July	(Ukraine) Bohdan Bondarenko	(Czech Republic) Zuzana Hejnová
August	not assigned	
September	(Ukraine) Bohdan Bondarenko	(Ukraine) Hanna Melnychenko
October	(Norway) Ørjan Grønnevig	(Norway) Karoline Bjerkeli Grøvdal
November	(Ukraine) Oleksandr Sitkovskiy	(Hungary) Zsófia Erdélyi
December	(Belgium) Pieter-Jan Hannes	(France) Sophie Duarte

2012
Month	Men	Women
January	(Russia) Aleksey Dmitrik	(United Kingdom) Holly Bleasdale
February	(Poland) Adam Kszczot	(Russia) Yelena Isinbayeva
March	(France) Renaud Lavillenie	(Ukraine) Nataliya Dobrynska
April	(Slovakia) Matej Tóth	(Belarus) Aksana Menkova
May	(Germany) Robert Harting	(United Kingdom) Jessica Ennis
June	(France) Renaud Lavillenie	(Ukraine) Olha Saladuha
July	(Russia) Ivan Ukhov	(Russia) Natalya Antyukh
August	not assigned	
September	(Germany) Björn Otto	(Czech Republic) Barbora Špotáková
October	(Italy) Alex Baldaccini	(Turkey) Elvan Abeylegesse
November	(Portugal) José Rocha	(Portugal) Ana Dulce Félix
December	(Italy) Andrea Lalli	(Republic of Ireland) Fionnuala Britton

2011
Month	Men	Women
January	(Russia) Ivan Ukhov	(United Kingdom) Jessica Ennis
February	(France) Teddy Tamgho	(Italy) Antonietta Di Martino
March	(Latvia) Zigismunds Sirmais	(United Kingdom) Charlotte Purdue
April	(Russia) Valeriy Borchin	(Russia) Olga Kaniskina
May	(France) Christophe Lemaitre	(Germany) Betty Heidler
June	(France) Christophe Lemaitre	(Bulgaria) Ivet Lalova
July	(Turkey) Ahmet Arslan	(Russia) Darya Klishina
August	not assigned	
September	(Germany) Robert Harting	(Russia) Anna Chicherova
October	(Poland) Henryk Szost	(Russia) Liliya Shobukhova
November	(Switzerland) Viktor Röthlin	(Portugal) Ana Dulce Félix
December	(Belgium) Atelaw Yeshetela	(Republic of Ireland) Fionnuala Britton

2010
Month	Men	Women
January	(Russia) Ivan Ukhov	(United Kingdom) Jessica Ennis
February	(Republic of Ireland) David Gillick	(Turkey) Elvan Abeylegesse
March	(France) Teddy Tamgho	(United Kingdom) Jessica Ennis
April	(Estonia) Gerd Kanter	(Russia) Liliya Shobukhova
May	(Norway) Andreas Thorkildsen	(United Kingdom) Jessica Ennis
June	(France) Teddy Tamgho	(Poland) Anita Włodarczyk
July	(France) Christophe Lemaitre	(Turkey) Nevin Yanıt
August	not assigned	
September	(Italy) Andrew Howe	(Croatia) Blanka Vlašić
October	(United Kingdom) David Greene	(Russia) Liliya Shobukhova
November	(Italy) Ruggero Pertile	(Portugal) Jéssica Augusto
December	(Ukraine) Serhiy Lebid	(Portugal) Jéssica Augusto

2009
Month	Men	Women
January	(United Kingdom) Mo Farah	(Croatia) Blanka Vlašić
February	(Russia) Ivan Ukhov	(Russia) Yelena Isinbayeva
March	(Germany) Sebastian Bayer	(Germany) Ariane Friedrich
April	(Estonia) Gerd Kanter	(Germany) Irina Mikitenko
May	(Portugal) Nelson Évora	(United Kingdom) Jessica Ennis
June	(France) Renaud Lavillenie	(Germany) Ariane Friedrich
July	(Poland) Tomasz Majewski	(Spain) Marta Domínguez
August	not assigned	
September	(Slovenia) Primož Kozmus	(Croatia) Blanka Vlašić
October	(United Kingdom) Mo Farah	(Portugal) Inês Monteiro
November	(Austria) Günther Weidlinger	(Portugal) Ana Dulce Félix
December	(Spain) Alemayehu Bezabeh	(United Kingdom) Hayley Yelling

2008
Month	Men	Women
January	(Portugal) Nelson Évora	(Sweden) Susanna Kallur
February	(Switzerland) Viktor Röthlin	(Sweden) Susanna Kallur
March	(Sweden) Stefan Holm	(Russia) Yelena Soboleva
April	(Turkey) Selim Bayrak	(Turkey) Elvan Abeylegesse
May	(Norway) Andreas Thorkildsen	(Czech Republic) Barbora Špotáková
June	(United Kingdom) Phillips Idowu	(Croatia) Blanka Vlašić
July	(United Kingdom) Martyn Rooney	(Russia) Yelena Isinbayeva
August	not assigned	
September	(Russia) Andrey Silnov	(Czech Republic) Barbora Špotáková
October	(Republic of Ireland) Martin Fagan	(Netherlands) Lornah Kiplagat
November	(Portugal) Rui Pedro Silva	(United Kingdom) Paula Radcliffe
December	(Ukraine) Serhiy Lebid	(Netherlands) Hilda Kibet

2007
Month	Men	Women
January	(Russia) Ivan Ukhov	(Sweden) Susanna Kallur
February	(Republic of Ireland) David Gillick	(Russia) Yelena Isinbayeva
March	(United Kingdom) Jason Gardener	(Portugal) Naide Gomes
April	(Switzerland) Viktor Röthlin	(Turkey) Elvan Abeylegesse
May	(Turkey) Halil Akkaş	(Russia) Tatyana Lysenko
June	(Portugal) Francis Obikwelu	(Belgium) Kim Gevaert
July	(Lithuania) Virgilijus Alekna	(Croatia) Blanka Vlašić
August	not assigned	
September	(Poland) Marek Plawgo	(Croatia) Blanka Vlašić
October	(Netherlands) Kamiel Maase	(Netherlands) Lornah Kiplagat
November	(Italy) Stefano Baldini	(United Kingdom) Paula Radcliffe
December	(Ukraine) Serhiy Lebid	(Spain) Marta Domínguez

== Multiwinners (4+) ==
Men

- (Norway) Jakob Ingebrigtsen (middle distance, cross country) – 11 wins
- (France) Renaud Lavillenie (pole vault) – 11 wins
- (Norway) Karsten Warholm (400m, 400m hurdles) – 7 wins
- (Sweden) Armand Duplantis (pole vault) – 6 wins
- (Russia) Ivan Ukhov (high jump) – 6 wins
- (Ukraine) Bohdan Bondarenko (high jump) – 5 wins
- (Ukraine) Serhiy Lebid (cross country, marathon) – 4 wins
- (Germany) Johannes Vetter (javelin) – 4 wins

Women

- (United Kingdom) Jessica Ennis-Hill (heptathlon) – 7 wins
- (Greece) Katerina Stefanidi (pole vault) – 6 wins
- (Croatia) Blanka Vlašić (high jump) – 6 wins
- (United Kingdom) Eilish McColgan – 5 wins
- (Netherlands) Dafne Schippers (100m, 200m) – 5 wins
- (Czech Republic) Barbora Špotáková (javelin throw) – 5 wins
- (Turkey) Elvan Abeylegesse (5000m, 10,000m) – 4 wins
- (Portugal) Ana Dulce Felix (distance running - cross, road, track) – 4 wins
- (Russia) Yelena Isinbayeva (pole vault) – 4 wins
- (Germany) Konstanze Klosterhalfen – 4 wins
- (Belgium) Nafissatou Thiam (heptathlon) – 4 wins
- (Serbia) Ivana Španović (long jump) – 4 wins

== See also ==
- European Athlete of the Year
