= Bohdan Bondarenko =

Ukrainian high jumper (born 1989)

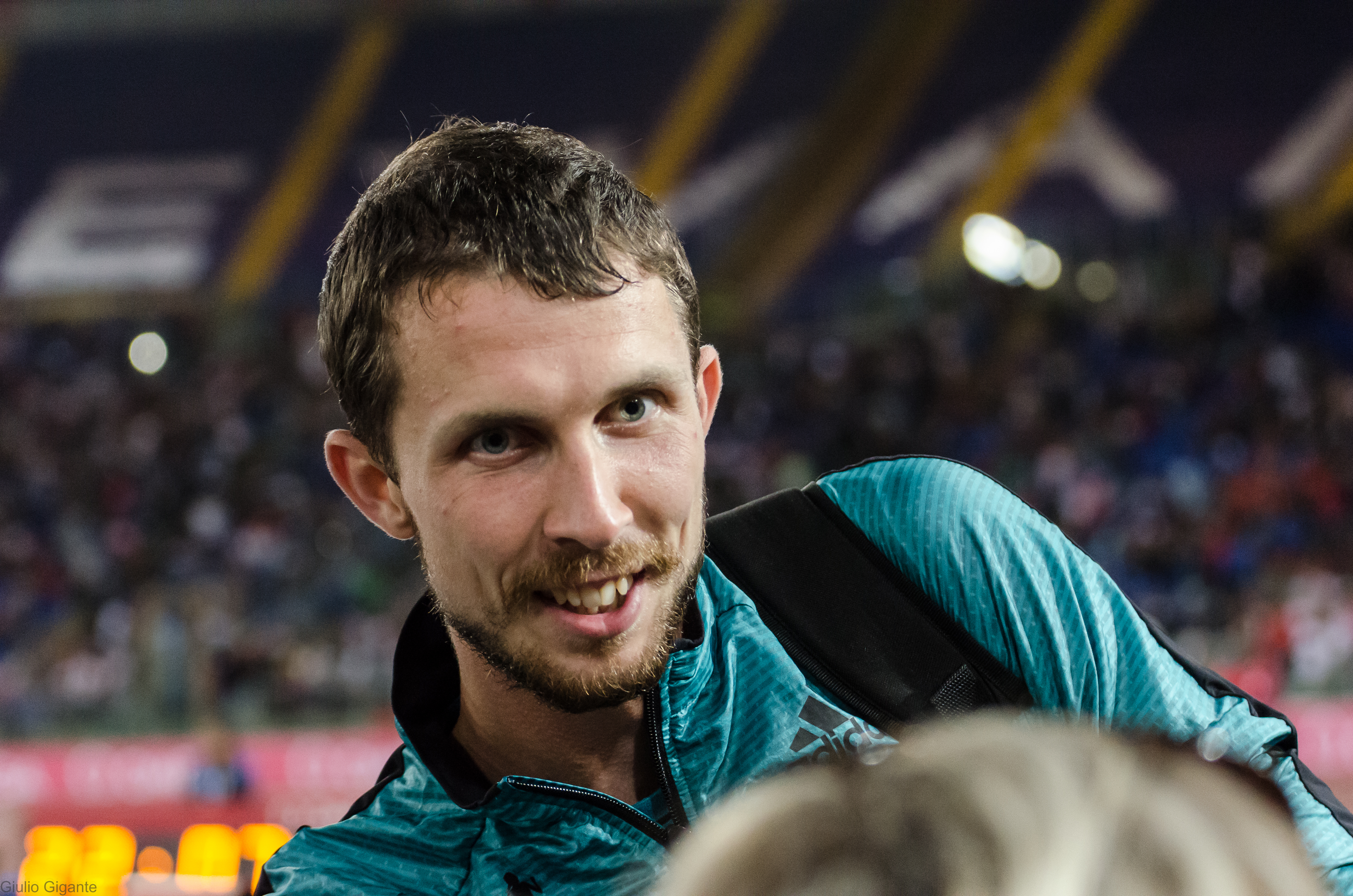
- Bondarenko in 2016

Personal information
- Native name: Богдан Вікторович Бондаренко
- Full name: Bohdan Viktorovych Bondarenko
- Born: 30 August 1989 (age 37) Kharkiv, Ukrainian SSR, Soviet Union
- Height: 1.98 m (6 ft 6 in)
- Weight: 77 kg (170 lb)

Sport
- Country: Ukraine
- Sport: Athletics
- Event: High jump

Achievements and titles
- Personal bests: High jump outdoor: 2.42 m (2014); High jump indoor: 2.27 m (2009)
Medal record
Event	1st	2nd	3rd
Olympic Games	0	0	1
World Championships	1	1	0
Diamond League Final	1	2	1
European Championships	1	0	0
European Games	1	0	1
Universiade	1	0	0
European Team Championships	1	0	0
Total	6	3	3
Olympic Games
Bronze medal – third place	2016 Rio de Janeiro	High jump
World Championships
Gold medal – first place	2013 Moscow	High jump
Silver medal – second place	2015 Beijing	High jump
Diamond League
First place	2013	High jump
Second place	2014	High jump
Second place	2015	High jump
Third place	2017	High jump
European Championships
Gold medal – first place	2014 Zurich	High jump
European Games
Gold medal – first place	2019 Minsk	Team event
Bronze medal – third place	2019 Minsk	High jump
European Team Championships
Gold medal – first place	2013 Gateshead	High jump
Continental Cup
Gold medal – first place	2014 Marrakesh	High jump
European U23 Championships
Gold medal – first place	2011 Ostrava	High jump
Summer Universiade
Gold medal – first place	2011 Shenzhen	High jump
World Junior Championships
Gold medal – first place	2008 Bydgoszcz	High jump
Bronze medal – third place	2006 Beijing	High jump
European Youth Olympic Festival
Silver medal – second place	2005 Lignano Sabbiadoro	High jump

Bohdan Viktorovych Bondarenko (Ukrainian: Богдан Вікторович Бондаренко; born 30 August 1989) is a Ukrainian high jumper. He is the 2013 World champion, 2014 European champion, and 2016 Olympic bronze medalist.

Bondarenko uses the Fosbury Flop technique, jumping off his right leg. He is one of the tallest high jumpers competing on the elite Diamond League circuit, standing 1.98 meters (6' 6"). On 14 June 2014, he achieved his personal best jump of 2.42 metres at the 2014 IAAF Diamond League event in New York City. The jump is a European record and places him joint third on the men's all-time list, behind Javier Sotomayor and Mutaz Essa Barshim and tied with Patrik Sjöberg. His indoor best is 2.27 metres.

== Athletics career ==
=== Coaching and professional support ===
Bondarenko is coached by his father Viktor Bondarenko. When Bohdan won the European Athlete of the Year trophy 2013, his father (and thus trainer) received a trainer's award of the European Athletics Association. In a May 2016 interview for the IAAF's official website, Bondarenko said of his father, "I have always understood him and he has always understood me. Many sportsmen cannot be coached by their parents, but for me he has been very good."

=== Junior competitions and early senior career ===
In 2005, Bondarenko had a jump of 2.15 metres, achieved in September in Yalta, and in January 2006 in Kyiv, he improved to 2.21 on the indoor track. In August 2006, he competed at the 2006 World Junior Championships in Beijing. With a jump of 2.14 metres in the qualifying round, he barely managed to reach the final round, where, at age 16, he was the youngest finalist. Six athletes recorded 2.14 metres, and only two of them reached the final, due to having fewer fouls in the competition. In the final, however, Bondarenko improved greatly to win the bronze medal with a jump of 2.26 metres. The competition was dominated by the duel behind gold medallist Huang Haiqiang and silver medallist Niki Palli. In 2007, he improved his indoor best mark to 2.25 at a meet in Kyiv in February. In the outdoor season, he only managed 2.19 metres.

=== World Junior Champion Outdoors 2008 ===
In 2008, Bondarenko was eligible for his second World Junior Championships. He had not recorded a notable result during the indoor season, but with a jump of 2.25 metres he qualified for the 2008 World Junior Championships in Bydgoszcz, leading the season's list for juniors. This time, all jumpers with 2.14 in the qualifying round passed on to the final. In the final, Bondarenko cleared every height from 2.08 through 2.26 on the first attempt, except for one miss at 2.21 metres. This was enough to win the gold medal, ahead of Sylwester Bednarek, who placed fourth two years earlier, and Miguel Ángel Sancho. Pre-event favorite Karim Samir Lofty disappointed greatly, ending in last place.

In the 2008–2009 indoor season, Bondarenko recorded a new career best as he jumped 2.27 in February in Łódź. Entering the 2009 European Indoor Championships, he managed to equal this height in the qualifying round, which gave him a place in the final. Here, he entered at 2.15, passed 2.20 in his second attempt but failed at 2.25. He ended in ninth and last place.

=== 2012 London Olympics ===
He set a new personal best of 2.31 on 17 June 2012, jumping in his native Ukraine at Mykolaiv. Bondarenko was a finalist at the 2012 Summer Olympics in London on 7 August 2012, clearing 2.29 and finishing in 7th place. Only 2 men jumped higher, as Bondarenko and five other jumpers ended their competition at 2.29, with the places determined by the countback: there was a 3-way tie for the third place bronze medal (based on clearing 2.29 on their first try), with Bondarenko relegated to seventh because he needed two attempts to clear that height.

=== 2013 outdoor season ===
Bondarenko seems not to have competed on the indoor circuit during the previous years. His indoor best of 2.27 dated to February 2009 and his outdoor personal best (PB) of 2.31 was set in June 2012. He bested that by jumping 2.33 in his first two Diamond League meets in 2013, beginning with the season's first Diamond League meet at Doha, UAE on 10 May, then again at Shanghai, China, on 18 May. He won 8 of his first 9 competitions. After his win at Doha, Bondarenko told EME News that his victory was unexpected: "I had two pre-season training camps in Yevpatoriya where I injured my take-off (right) knee in the end of April. I was able to make only one technical practice one week before my first performance this season. Moreover, in Doha, I felt discomfort not only in the knee but also in the feet I had operated in 2009. Pain accompanied me at all attempts (in Doha) but such physical conditions became usual for me during last three years".

Bondarenko then set another new PB on Sunday 30 June, winning the Sainsbury's Grand Prix meeting (a Diamond League competition) in Birmingham, England with a jump of 2.36, which tied the meet record and bested Eric Kynard of the US, who finished second with a jump of 2.34.

Less than a week later, in July 2013, Bondarenko cleared 2.41 metres at another Diamond League meet, the Athletissima, in Lausanne, Switzerland. That was the highest jump in the world since 1994. By clearing 2.41, Bondarenko also broke the Ukrainian national record of 2.40, set by Rudolf Povarnitsyn in 1985 (which was then a new world record.) Bondarenko was pushed to 2.41 by American Eric Kynard. They were the only jumpers remaining after 2.33 and engaged in a "passing" duel- Kynard took the lead with a first attempt clearance of 2.33, Bondarenko passed, but then cleared 2.35 on his first attempt. Kynard missed at 2.35, then passed to 2.37, clearing on his first attempt to retake the lead as Bondarenko passed. When Bondarenko then cleared 2.39 on his first try, Kynard missed and then used his two remaining attempts at 2.41 (unsuccessfully.) Bondarenko cleared 2.41 (7 feet, 11 inches) on his third try (only his 7th jump of the competition): video of his 2.41 clearance shows him taking off nearly 4 feet away from the bar and clearing it cleanly (if only barely). He then made three excellent attempts at a new world record of 2.46—on each of his three attempts he succeeded in getting his head, shoulders and back over the bar, but not his hips.

“I used to ask for support from the public, but then I would often get too excited, causing me troubles in my run-up. Now I ask the crowd for silence when I jump, but I’d like to get myself used to jumping with the support of the crowd in the near future.”

— In a mid-July 2013 interview Bondarenko explains his new-found success

On Friday 26 July, competing in yet another Diamond League meet – the Anniversary Games in London's 2012 Olympic Stadium – Bondarenko again bested Eric Kynard, winning with a jump of 2.38 (7' 9-3/4") to Kynard's 2.36. Bondarenko did not even begin jumping until 2.28 (7' 5-3/4"), the highest "opening" height ever in a Diamond League event. He secured the win after just his third jump and then had the bar raised to 2.43 (7' 11 1/2") – one centimeter above the European record set by Sweden's Patrik Sjöberg in 1987. He made one excellent attempt and despite knocking the bar off, he felt confident enough to have the bar raised for a world record attempt of 2.47 (8 feet, one and one-quarter inch), threatening the 20-year world record of 2.45 held by Cuba's Javier Sotomayor. Although his two attempts at 2.47 failed, the experience was rewarding.

=== 2013 Moscow World Championship ===
In August, Bondarenko competed at the 2013 World Championships in Moscow, Russia. With three athletes (the other two being Derek Drouin and Mutaz Essa Barshim) still jumping at 2.41m, Bondarenko was the only one to clear that mark, thus equalling his personal best and world leading jump and breaking Javier Sotomayor's Championship record. He needed to in order to win the competition, since he had passed 2.38, a height cleared by both his opponents. Drouin failed his 3 attempts at 2.41, while Barshim, after his first attempt, saved the remaining two for the following height of 2.44 (which Bondarenko had passed), but couldn't get it, settling for silver. With the gold medal around his neck, Bondarenko had another go at the world record, once again unsuccessfully.

Bondarenko was awarded the 2013 European Athlete of the Year trophy.

=== 2014 ===
Early in the season, Ivan Ukhov and then Mutaz Essa Barshim equalled Bondarenko's 2.41m making for the trio of contemporary athletes having cleared the third highest height in history.

May 11, Tokyo (1st, 2.40m). Bondarenko won the Diamond League meeting in Tokyo with a jump of 2.40m (7 ft-10.5in) in Tokyo on Sunday, beating the Olympic Champion Ivan Ukhov, who could manage "only" 2.34m (just two days after he cleared 2.41m to win in Doha on 9 May.)

June 5, Rome (2nd, 2.34m). All of the top high jumpers were entered in the "Golden Gala" Diamond League meet in Rome. After clearing 2.34m, Bondarenko elected to pass attempts at 2.37 and 2.41, the later which was cleared by Mutaz Essa Barshim. Bondarenko then had three close attempts at what would have been a European record of 2.43m.

June 8, Marrakesh (1st, 2.39m). Competing at the 7th Mohammed VI d’Athletisme IAAF World Challenge meeting in Marrakesh, Morocco on 8 June, Bondarenko won the meet when cleared 2.39m on his second try – just his fourth leap of the entire competition, having made first try jumps at 2.25m and 2.33m. The 2.39m is an African "All Comers" record, the highest jump ever on the African continent. Bondarenko then had the bar raised to world record height of 2.46m and made three unsuccessful attempts. Traditionally held in Rabat, this year the Mohammed VI d’Athletisme meeting was moved to the Grand Stade de Marrakech.

June 14, New York City (1st, 2.42m). The following week at the Adidas Grand Prix, Icahn Stadium, New York City, on Saturday afternoon June 14, Bondarenko and Barshim were locked in a tight competition, with both improving to 2.42m (on their first attempts), equalling Patrick Sjoberg's former world record from 1987 as the second best jumpers outdoors in history. [Ukhov and Carlo Thränhardt (1988) have also jumped that height under more controlled conditions indoors.] Still in competition, Bondarenko—whose clearance of 2.42m was just his fifth jump of the day—then passed while Barshim took one failed attempt at 2.44m. Saving his strength, Bondarenko took all three of his attempts at a world record height of 2.46, while Barshim took his remaining two attempts at 2.46m to try to beat Javier Sotomayor's world record of 2.45m that has stood since 1993. Almost incidental, Bondarenko won the competition on fewer misses. (Barshim clearing of 2.42 and attempt on 2.46 were much better than Bodarenko's.) Bondarenko now joins Sjoberg in possession of the European record. The 2.42m mark (7 feet 11 & one-quarter inch) is also the United States "Open" record - the highest jumps ever made in North America.

In August, Bondarenko took gold at the 2014 European Championships in Zurich.

=== 2015 to present ===
At the 2015 World Championships in Beijing, Bondarenko tied for silver with China's Zhang Guowei, behind Canada's Derek Drouin. He won the bronze medal at the 2016 Summer Olympics in Rio de Janeiro.

== Competition record ==
=== International competitions ===
Year	Competition	Venue	Position	Notes
Representing Ukraine
2006	World Junior Championships	Beijing, China	3rd	2.26 m
2007	European Junior Championships	Hengelo, Netherlands	9th	2.14 m
2008	World Junior Championships	Bydgoszcz, Poland	1st	2.26 m
2009	European Indoor Championships	Turin, Italy	9th	2.20 m
2011	European U23 Championships	Ostrava, Czech Republic	1st	2.30 m
2011	Universiade	Shenzhen, China	1st	2.28 m
2011	World Championships	Daegu, South Korea	15th (qual.)	2.28 m
2012	European Championships	Helsinki, Finland	11th	2.29 m
2012	Olympic Games	London, United Kingdom	7th	2.29 m
2013	European Team Championships	Gateshead, United Kingdom	1st	2.28 m
2013	World Championships	Moscow, Russia	1st	2.41 m
2014	European Championships	Zurich, Switzerland	1st	2.35 m
2014	Continental Cup	Marrakesh, Morocco	1st	2.37 m
2015	World Championships	Beijing, China	2nd	2.33 m
2016	Olympic Games	Rio de Janeiro, Brazil	3rd	2.33 m
2017	World Championships	London, United Kingdom	9th	2.25 m
2019	World Championships	Doha, Qatar	–	NM
2022	European Championships	Munich, Germany	14th (q)	2.17 m

== Recognition ==
- European Athlete of the Month for May 2013 of the European Athletic Association
- European Athlete of the Month for June 2013 of the European Athletic Association
- European Athlete of the Month for July 2013 of the European Athletic Association
- European Athlete of the Month for September 2013 of the European Athletic Association
- European Athlete of the Year (2013)
- Track & Field Athlete of the Year (2013)
- Flotrack's Athlete of the Year (2013)
- European Athlete of the Month for June 2014 of the European Athletic Association

== See also ==
- High jump all-time lists

Records
Preceded by (Sweden) Patrik Sjöberg	Men's High Jump European Record Holder; 14 June 2014 – (shared with (Sweden) Patrik Sjöberg)	Succeeded by Incumbent
Awards
Preceded by (Kenya) David Rudisha	Men's Track & Field Athlete of the Year; 2013	Succeeded by (France) Renaud Lavillenie
Sporting positions
Preceded by (Russia) Ivan Ukhov (i) (Qatar) Mutaz Essa Barshim	Men's High Jump Best Year Performance; 2013	Succeeded by (Qatar) Mutaz Essa Barshim
