= Zahorulko =

Zahorulko or Zagorulko (Ukrainian: Загорулько) is a gender-neutral Ukrainian surname. Notable people with the surname include:

- Artur Zahorulko (born 1993), Ukrainian football player
- Yevgeniy Zagorulko (1942–2021), Russian high jump coach
