= Athletics at the 2005 Summer Universiade – Men's high jump =

The men's high jump event at the 2005 Summer Universiade was held on 16–18 August in İzmir, Turkey.

== Medalists ==
| Gold | Silver | Bronze |
|---|---|---|
| Aleksander Waleriańczyk; Poland | Hennazdy Maroz; Belarus | Martyn Bernard; Great Britain |

== Results ==
=== Qualification ===
| Rank | Group | Athlete | Nationality | 1.90 | 2.00 | 2.10 | 2.15 | 2.20 | 2.23 | Result | Notes |
|---|---|---|---|---|---|---|---|---|---|---|---|
| 1 | A | Hennazdy Maroz | Belarus | | | | | | | 2.20 | q |
| 1 | B | Aleksander Waleriańczyk | Poland | | | | | | | 2.20 | q |
| 3 | B | Rainer Piirimets | Estonia | | | | | | | 2.20 | q, SB |
| 4 | A | Martyn Bernard | Great Britain | | | | | | | 2.20 | q |
| 5 | A | Gerardo Martínez | Mexico | | | | | | | 2.15 | q |
| 5 | A | Heikki Taneli | Finland | – | – | o | o | xx | | 2.15 | q |
| 5 | A | Mihail Tomaras | Greece | | | | | | | 2.15 | q |
| 5 | A | Ivan Ukhov | Russia | | | | | | | 2.15 | q |
| 5 | B | Rodrigo de Assis | Brazil | | | | | | | 2.15 | q |
| 5 | B | Jaswinder Gill | Canada | | | | | | | 2.15 | q |
| 5 | B | Yuriy Krymarenko | Ukraine | | | | | | | 2.15 | q |
| 5 | B | Tom Parsons | Great Britain | | | | | | | 2.15 | q |
| 5 | B | Liang Tong | China | | | | | | | 2.15 | q |
| 14 | A | Mark Dillon | Canada | | | | | | | 2.10 | |
| 14 | A | Ahmed Farouk El-Zaher | Egypt | | | | | | | 2.10 | |
| 14 | B | Artsiom Zaitsau | Belarus | | | | | | | 2.10 | |
| 17 | A | Normunds Pūpols | Latvia | | | | | | | 2.10 | |
| 17 | B | Jaran Maliwong | Thailand | | | | | | | 2.10 | =PB |
| 19 | A | Aleksandr Korolyev | Kazakhstan | | | | | | | 2.00 | |
| 19 | B | Zoltán Vaskó | Hungary | | | | | | | 2.00 | |
| 19 | ? | Hans von Lieres | Namibia | | | | | | | 2.00 | |
| 22 | A | Anton Gorjatsihh | Estonia | | | | | | | 2.00 | |
| 23 | ? | Abou Sani | Niger | | | | | | | 1.90 | |
| 23 | B | Henry Linton | Costa Rica | | | | | | | 1.90 | |
| 25 | ? | Le Phuoc That | Vietnam | | | | | | | 1.90 | |
| | B | Osku Torro | Finland | – | – | xx | | | | NM | |
| | B | İlker Azazi | Turkey | | | | | | | NM | |
| | ? | Fábio Baptista | Brazil | | | | | | | NM | |

=== Final ===
| Rank | Athlete | Nationality | 2.10 | 2.15 | 2.20 | 2.23 | 2.26 | 2.28 | 2.30 | 2.32 | Result | Notes |
|---|---|---|---|---|---|---|---|---|---|---|---|---|
| 1st place, gold medalist(s) | Aleksander Waleriańczyk | Poland | o | o | o | o | xxo | o | xxo | xxx | 2.30 | SB |
| 2nd place, silver medalist(s) | Hennazdy Maroz | Belarus | – | o | o | xo | o | x– | xx | | 2.26 | |
| 3rd place, bronze medalist(s) | Martyn Bernard | Great Britain | x– | o | o | xo | xxx | | | | 2.23 | |
| 4 | Ivan Ukhov | Russia | – | – | xxo | xo | xxx | | | | 2.23 | |
| 5 | Gerardo Martínez | Mexico | o | o | o | xxo | xxx | | | | 2.23 | |
| 6 | Heikki Taneli | Finland | o | o | o | xxx | | | | | 2.20 | |
| 6 | Yuriy Krymarenko | Ukraine | – | o | o | xxx | | | | | 2.20 | |
| 8 | Rainer Piirimets | Estonia | o | xo | o | xxx | | | | | 2.20 | =SB |
| 9 | Mihail Tomaras | Greece | o | o | xxx | | | | | | 2.15 | |
| 10 | Jaswinder Gill | Canada | o | xo | xxx | | | | | | 2.15 | |
| 10 | Tom Parsons | Great Britain | o | xo | xxx | | | | | | 2.15 | |
| 12 | Rodrigo de Assis | Brazil | o | xxo | xxx | | | | | | 2.15 | |
| 13 | Liang Tong | China | o | – | xxx | | | | | | 2.10 | |
