= 2006 European Athletics Championships – Men's high jump =

Men's high jump at the European Athletics Championships

The men's high jump at the 2006 European Athletics Championships were held at the Ullevi on August 7 and August 9.

== Medalists ==
Gold	Silver	Bronze
Andrey Silnov; Russia	Tomáš Janků; Czech Republic	Stefan Holm; Sweden

== Schedule ==
Date	Time	Round
August 7, 2006	17:45	Qualification
August 9, 2006	18:10	Final

== Results ==
=== Qualification ===
Qualification: Qualifying Performance 2.28 (Q) or at least 12 best performers (q) advance to the final.

Rank	Group	Name	Nationality	2.05	2.15	2.19	2.23	2.26	Result	Notes
1	A	Nicola Ciotti	Italy	-	o	o	o	o	2.26	q
1	A	Linus Thörnblad	Sweden	-	o	o	o	o	2.26	q
1	A	Tomáš Janků	Czech Republic	-	o	o	o	o	2.26	q
1	B	Oskari Frösén	Finland	-	o	o	o	o	2.26	q
1	B	Stefan Holm	Sweden	-	o	o	o	o	2.26	q
1	B	Svatoslav Ton	Czech Republic	-	o	o	o	o	2.26	q
7	A	Niki Palli	Israel	o	o	o	o	xo	2.26	q
7	B	Yaroslav Rybakov	Russia	-	o	o	o	xo	2.26	q
9	B	Giulio Ciotti	Italy	-	o	xo	o	xo	2.26	q
10	A	Andrey Silnov	Russia	-	o	o	o	xxo	2.26	q
11	A	Ivan Ukhov	Russia	-	-	-	o	-	2.23	q
11	A	Andrea Bettinelli	Italy	-	o	o	o	xxx	2.23	q
11	B	Wilbert Pennings	Netherlands	-	o	o	o	xxx	2.23	q
14	A	Martyn Bernard	United Kingdom	-	o	xxo	xo	xxx	2.23	
15	B	Peter Horák	Slovakia	-	o	o	xxo	xxx	2.23	
15	B	Normunds Pūpols	Latvia	-	o	o	xxo	xxx	2.23	
17	A	Germaine Mason	United Kingdom	-	o	o	xxx		2.19	
17	B	Rožle Prezelj	Slovenia	o	o	o	xxx		2.19	
19	A	Heikki Taneli	Finland	-	xo	o	xxx		2.19	
19	B	Andriy Sokolovskyy	Ukraine	-	xo	o	xxx		2.19	
21	B	Mickaël Hanany	France	-	xo	xo	xxx		2.19	
22	B	Javier Bermejo	Spain	o	o	xxx			2.15	
23	A	Osku Torro	Finland	-	xo	x-	x		2.15	
24	A	Jan-Peter Larsen	Netherlands	o	xxx				2.05	
	B	Adam Scarr	United Kingdom	-	xxx				NM	

=== Final ===
Rank	Name	Nationality	2.15	2.20	2.24	2.27	2.30	2.32	2.34	2.36	2.38	2.41	Result	Notes
1st place, gold medalist(s)	Andrey Silnov	Russia	-	o	o	o	o	o	o	o	-	xxx	2.36	CR, WL
2nd place, silver medalist(s)	Tomáš Janků	Czech Republic	o	xo	o	o	xo	o	xo	xx-	x		2.34	PB
3rd place, bronze medalist(s)	Stefan Holm	Sweden	-	o	o	o	o	o	xxo	xxx			2.34	SB
4	Linus Thörnblad	Sweden	-	o	o	o	xo	o	xxo	xxx			2.34	PB
5	Yaroslav Rybakov	Russia	-	o	o	o	o	x-	xx				2.30	
6	Niki Palli	Israel	o	xo	o	o	xxx						2.27	
6	Nicola Ciotti	Italy	o	o	xo	o	xxx						2.27	
6	Svatoslav Ton	Czech Republic	o	xo	o	o	xxx						2.27	
9	Oskari Frösén	Finland	o	xo	xo	o	xxx						2.27	
10	Giulio Ciotti	Italy	o	o	o	xo	xxx						2.27	
11	Andrea Bettinelli	Italy	o	xx-	o	xxx							2.24	
12	Wilbert Pennings	Netherlands	o	o	xxx								2.20	
12	Ivan Ukhov	Russia	-	o	-	xxx							2.20	
