= Joško Vlašić =

Croatian decathlete and athletics coach

Personal information
- Nationality: Croatian
- Born: 22 July 1956 (age 69) Split, PR Croatia, FPR Yugoslavia

Sport
- Event: Decathlon
- Club: ASK Split
- Now coaching: Blanka Vlašić

Achievements and titles
- Personal bests: 7659 pts (1983, NR)
Medal record
Men's athletics
Representing Yugoslavia
Mediterranean Games
Gold medal – first place	1983 Casablanca	Decathlon
Bronze medal – third place	1979 Split	Decathlon

Joško Vlašić (Croatian pronunciation: [ˈjɔʃkɔ ˈʋlaʃitɕ]; born 22 July 1956) is a Croatian athletics coach and a former decathlete who represented Yugoslavia. Vlašić's greatest competitive success was winning the decathlon gold medal at the 1983 Mediterranean Games, but he is best known for coaching his daughter Blanka Vlašić, a world champion high jumper.

== Biography ==
Joško Vlašić was born in 1956 in Split. He started with athletics in ASK Split, a local club. His coach Ante Tešija decided Vlašić would do well in decathlon, describing him as "tall and skinny". According to Tešija, Vlašić was initially very skeptical regarding his aptitude for the sport, but he was tenacious, loved to train, and the results came quickly.

In the following years, Vlašić became the leading Yugoslav decathlete, winning five consecutive national championships, from 1979 to 1983. He won two decathlon medals in consecutive Mediterranean Games: bronze in 1979, and gold in 1983. His first child, Blanka Vlašić (born 1983), was named after Casablanca, the host city of the 1983 Games. Vlašić also competed in the 1983 World Championships, placing 16th.

Vlašić's decathlon personal best of 7659 points, set in İzmir in June 1983, was the Croatian record until July 2021.

=== Coaching career ===
In 1982 Vlašić graduated from the Faculty of Physical Culture in Zagreb, department in Split. He worked as a coach in his home club, ASK Split, and then as a physical education teacher in several elementary and high schools in Split. From 1994 to 2001, Vlašić worked as a fitness coach in KK Split basketball club. Since 2006, Vlašić is employed by the Croatian Athletics Federation as a professional athletics coach.

Vlašić is best known for coaching his daughter Blanka Vlašić. In her youth, she tried many athletic events, as well as sports such as tennis, basketball and volleyball, but settled on high jump after consultation with her father. As a high jumper, she became a double world outdoor champion, double world indoor champion, European champion, Olympic silver medalist, and double world junior champion. She describes her father as her "greatest asset".

== Personal life ==
Joško Vlašić is married to Venera Milin, a physical education teacher and a former cross-country skiing national champion. They have four children: Blanka (born 1983), Marin (born c. 1986), Luka (born c. 1992), and Nikola (born 1997).
