= Martyn Bernard =

British athlete, competing in high jump

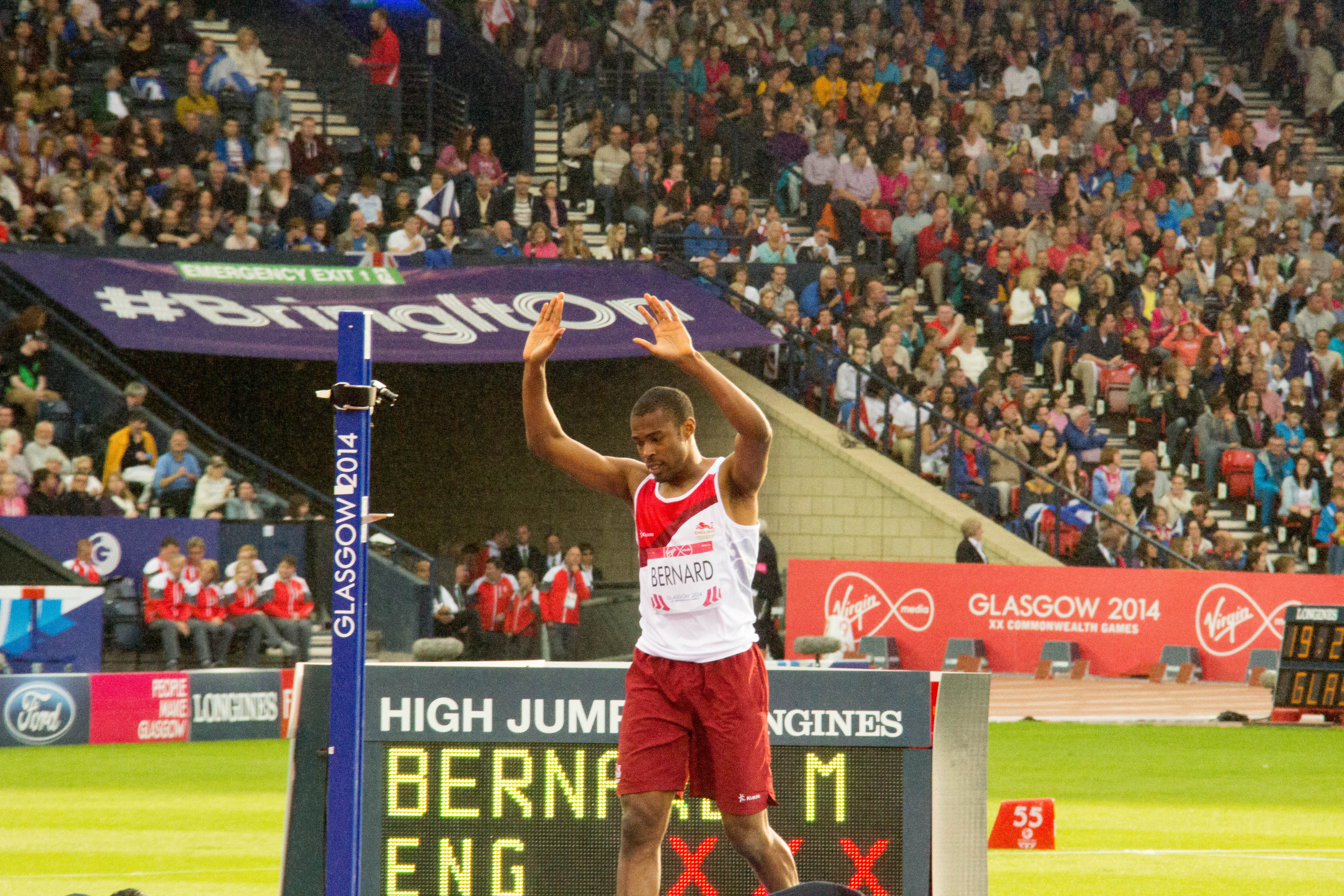
- Bernard in 2014

Personal information
- Nationality: British (English)
- Born: 15 December 1984 (age 41) Wakefield, England
- Height: 196 cm (6 ft 5 in)
- Weight: 83 kg (183 lb)

Sport
- Sport: Athletics
- Event: high jump
- Club: Wakefield Harriers
Medal record
Representing Great Britain
Men's athletics
European Athletics Championships
Bronze medal – third place	2010 Barcelona	High jump
European Indoor Championships
Bronze medal – third place	2007 Birmingham	High jump
Representing England
Commonwealth Games
Silver medal – second place	2006 Melbourne	High jump
Representing Europe
Continental Cup
Bronze medal – third place	2010 Split	High jump

Martyn John Bernard (born 15 December 1984) is a British former athlete who competed in the high jump and appeared at the 2008 Summer Olympics.

== Biography ==
Bernard represented England at the 2006 Commonwealth Games in Melbourne, where he won a silver medal. Shortly afterwards he became the British high jump champion after winning the British AAA Championships title at the 2006 AAA Championships.

Martyn graduated from Liverpool John Moores University in 2007 with a 2:1 degree in psychology and the same year won a bronze medal in the 2007 European Athletics Indoor Championships, won the British Athletics Championships title. In Osaka in 2007 he set an outdoor best of 2.29 in qualifying, and in the final after clearing 2.21 passed all the way up to 2.33, where he failed twice at 2.35. The reason he did this was, that he was injured and had to limit his jumps.

Bernard represented Great Britain at the 2008 Summer Olympics in the high jump. He qualified for the final along with two other Britons with a jump of 2.29.

He went on to win a third British high jump title at the 2010 British Athletics Championships.

He is cousin to singer VV Brown and older brother of Luke Bernard.

== Competition record ==
Year	Competition	Venue	Position	Notes
Representing Great Britain and England
2002	World Junior Championships	Kingston, Jamaica	10th	2.14 m
2003	European Junior Championships	Tampere, Finland	12th	2.15 m
2005	European U23 Championships	Erfurt, Germany	11th	2.21 m
2005	Universiade	İzmir, Turkey	3rd	2.23 m
2006	Commonwealth Games	Melbourne, Australia	2nd	2.26 m
2006	European Championships	Gothenburg, Sweden	14th (q)	2.23 m
2007	European Indoor Championships	Birmingham, United Kingdom	3rd	2.29 m
2007	Universiade	Bangkok, Thailand	5th	2.23 m
2007	World Championships	Osaka, Japan	14th	2.21 m
2008	Olympic Games	Beijing, China	9th	2.25 m
2009	European Indoor Championships	Turin, Italy	16th (q)	2.22 m
2010	European Championships	Barcelona, Spain	3rd	2.29 m
2010	Commonwealth Games	Delhi, India	16th (q)	2.13 m
2011	World Championships	Daegu, South Korea	29th (q)	2.21 m
2014	Commonwealth Games	Glasgow, United Kingdom	5th	2.21 m

== Personal bests ==
- High jump, outdoor: 2.29 (2007)
- High jump, indoor: 2.30 (2007)
