= 2002 World Junior Championships in Athletics – Women's high jump =

The women's high jump event at the 2002 World Junior Championships in Athletics was held in Kingston, Jamaica, at National Stadium on 19 and 20 July.

== Medalists ==
Gold	Blanka Vlašić; Croatia
Silver	Anna Ksok; Poland
Bronze	Petrina Price; Australia

== Results ==
=== Final ===
20 July

Rank	Name	Nationality	Result	Notes
1st place, gold medalist(s)	Blanka Vlašić	Croatia	1.96	
2nd place, silver medalist(s)	Anna Ksok	Poland	1.87	
3rd place, bronze medalist(s)	Petrina Price	Australia	1.87	
4	Elena Meuti	Italy	1.85	
5	Renáta Medgyesová	Slovakia	1.85	
6	Peaches Roach	Jamaica	1.83	
7	Aileen Herrmann	Germany	1.83	
8	Levern Spencer	Saint Lucia	1.83	
9	Emma Green	Sweden	1.80	
10	Angelica Johansson	Sweden	1.80	
11	Anett Jambor	Germany	1.75	
11	Raffaella Lamera	Italy	1.75	
11	Shaunette Davidson	Jamaica	1.75	

=== Qualifications ===
19 Jul

==== Group A ====
Rank	Name	Nationality	Result	Notes
1	Blanka Vlašić	Croatia	1.83	Q
1	Renáta Medgyesová	Slovakia	1.83	Q
3	Raffaella Lamera	Italy	1.83	Q
4	Shaunette Davidson	Jamaica	1.80	q
5	Anett Jambor	Germany	1.80	q
5	Emma Green	Sweden	1.80	q
7	Rebecca Jones	United Kingdom	1.80	
8	Ashley Robbins	United States	1.75	
9	Casey Narrier	Australia	1.70	
9	Svetlana Radzivil	Uzbekistan	1.70	

==== Group B ====
Rank	Name	Nationality	Result	Notes
1	Elena Meuti	Italy	1.83	Q
1	Anna Ksok	Poland	1.83	Q
3	Peaches Roach	Jamaica	1.83	Q
4	Aileen Herrmann	Germany	1.83	Q
5	Levern Spencer	Saint Lucia	1.83	Q
6	Petrina Price	Australia	1.83	Q
7	Angelica Johansson	Sweden	1.80	q
8	Kaylene Wagner	United States	1.80	
9	Stephanie Higham	United Kingdom	1.75	
10	Zhao Wei	China	1.75	

== Participation ==
According to an unofficial count, 20 athletes from 13 countries participated in the event.

- Australia (2)
- China (1)
- Croatia (1)
- Germany (2)
- Italy (2)
- Jamaica (2)
- Poland (1)
- Saint Lucia (1)
- Slovakia (1)
- Sweden (2)
- United Kingdom (2)
- United States (2)
- Uzbekistan (1)
