= 2006 World Junior Championships in Athletics – Men's high jump =

The men's high jump event at the 2006 World Junior Championships in Athletics was held in Beijing, China, at Chaoyang Sports Centre on 15 and 17 August.

== Medalists ==
Gold	Huang Haiqiang; China
Silver	Niki Palli; Israel
Bronze	Bohdan Bondarenko; Ukraine

== Results ==
=== Final ===
17 August

Rank	Name	Nationality	Result	Notes
1st place, gold medalist(s)	Huang Haiqiang	China	2.32	
2nd place, silver medalist(s)	Niki Palli	Israel	2.29	
3rd place, bronze medalist(s)	Bohdan Bondarenko	Ukraine	2.26	
4	Sylwester Bednarek	Poland	2.23	
5	Raúl Spank	Germany	2.23	
6	Dimítrios Hondrokoúkis	Greece	2.19	
7	Niko Kyyhkynen	Finland	2.19	
8	Joe Kindred	United States	2.15	
9	Liam Zamel-Paez	Australia	2.15	
9	Sébastien Deschamps	France	2.15	
11	Kane Brigg	Australia	2.10	
12	Robbie Grabarz	United Kingdom	2.05	

=== Qualifications ===
15 August

==== Group A ====
Rank	Name	Nationality	Result	Notes
1	Huang Haiqiang	China	2.18	Q
2	Dimítrios Hondrokoúkis	Greece	2.18	Q
2	Sylwester Bednarek	Poland	2.18	Q
4	Raúl Spank	Germany	2.18	Q
5	Liam Zamel-Paez	Australia	2.18	Q
5	Niko Kyyhkynen	Finland	2.18	Q
7	Bohdan Bondarenko	Ukraine	2.14	q
8	Robbie Grabarz	United Kingdom	2.14	q
9	Roman Yevgenev	Russia	2.14	
10	Abdel-Aziz Namaoui	France	2.14	
11	Guilherme Cobbo	Brazil	2.14	
12	Lee Hup Wei	Malaysia	2.10	
13	Jorge Rouco	Mexico	2.10	
14	Jamaal Wilson	Bahamas	2.10	
15	Hashem Iqeebi	Saudi Arabia	2.10	
16	Martin Kalafus	Slovakia	2.10	
17	Wagner Miller	Colombia	2.05	
	Ryan Fritz	United States	NH	

==== Group B ====
Rank	Name	Nationality	Result	Notes
1	Niki Palli	Israel	2.18	Q
1	Joe Kindred	United States	2.18	Q
3	Sébastien Deschamps	France	2.18	Q
4	Kane Brigg	Australia	2.18	Q
5	Jovan Vukicevic	Serbia	2.14	
6	Karim Lotfy	Egypt	2.10	
6	Rashid Al-Mannai	Qatar	2.10	
8	Vitaliy Tsykunov	Kazakhstan	2.10	
8	Raivydas Stanys	Lithuania	2.10	
10	Aleksandr Nartov	Ukraine	2.10	
11	Sergei Kabyak	Belarus	2.10	
12	Amir Hossein Zadeh	Iran	2.05	
13	Gao Wenbo	China	2.05	
14	Olivér Harsányi	Hungary	2.05	
15	Alex Soto	Spain	2.05	
16	Benjamin Lauckner	Germany	2.00	
16	Riccardo Cecolin	Italy	2.00	
18	Torlarp Sudjanta	Thailand	1.95	

== Participation ==
According to an unofficial count, 36 athletes from 30 countries participated in the event.

- Australia (2)
- Bahamas (1)
- Belarus (1)
- Brazil (1)
- China (2)
- Colombia (1)
- Egypt (1)
- Finland (1)
- France (2)
- Germany (2)
- Greece (1)
- Hungary (1)
- Iran (1)
- Israel (1)
- Italy (1)
- Kazakhstan (1)
- Lithuania (1)
- Malaysia (1)
- Mexico (1)
- Poland (1)
- Qatar (1)
- Russia (1)
- Saudi Arabia (1)
- Serbia (1)
- Slovakia (1)
- Spain (1)
- Thailand (1)
- Ukraine (2)
- United Kingdom (1)
- United States (2)
