= 2003 European Athletics U23 Championships – Women's high jump =

The women's high jump event at the 2003 European Athletics U23 Championships was held in Bydgoszcz, Poland, at Zawisza Stadion on 19 July.

== Medalists ==
Gold	Blanka Vlašić; Croatia
Silver	Yelena Slesarenko; Russia
Bronze	Anna Ksok; Poland

== Results ==
=== Final ===
19 July

Rank	Name	Nationality	Attempts											Result	Notes
Rank	Name	Nationality	1.70	1.75	1.80	1.84	1.87	1.90	1.92	1.94	1.96	1.98	2.00	Result	Notes
1st place, gold medalist(s)	Blanka Vlašić	Croatia	–	–	–	o	–	o	xo	xo	o	o	xxx	1.98	
2nd place, silver medalist(s)	Yelena Slesarenko	Russia	–	–	o	–	o	o	xo	o	xo	–	xxx	1.96	
3rd place, bronze medalist(s)	Anna Ksok	Poland	–	–	o	o	o	o	xxo	x–	xx			1.92	
4	Tatyana Grigoryeva	Russia	–	o	o	o	xo	xo	xxx					1.90	
5	Melanie Skotnik	Germany	–	o	o	o	o	xxx						1.87	
6	Nikolia Mitropoulou	Greece	–	o	o	xxo	o	xxx						1.87	
7	Gaëlle Niaré	France	–	–	o	xo	xo	xxx						1.87	
8	Barbora Laláková	Czech Republic	–	o	o	o	xxo	xxx						1.87	
8	Hanna Mikkonen	Finland	–	o	o	o	xxo	xxx						1.87	
10	Katja Schötz	Germany	–	o	o	xo	xxx							1.84	
11	Elena Meuti	Italy	o	o	o	xxo	xxx							1.84	
12	Anne Gerd Eieland	Norway	–	xo	o	xxx								1.80	
13	Estefanía Guillena	Spain	o	o	xo	xxx								1.80	
14	Elena Brambilla	Italy	o	xo	xo	xxx								1.80	
15	Natalie Clark	United Kingdom	ox	o	xxx									1.75	
16	Magalie Cartal	France	–	xo	xxx									1.75	

== Participation ==
According to an unofficial count, 16 athletes from 12 countries participated in the event.

- Croatia (1)
- Czech Republic (1)
- Finland (1)
- France (2)
- Germany (2)
- Greece (1)
- Italy (2)
- Norway (1)
- Poland (1)
- Russia (2)
- Spain (1)
- United Kingdom (1)
