= Elena Meuti =

Italian high jumper (born 1983)

Personal information
- Full name: Elena Maria Assunta Meuti
- Nationality: Italian
- Born: 28 June 1983 (age 42) Rome, Italy
- Height: 1.74 m (5 ft 8 1/2 in)
- Weight: 55 kg (121 lb)

Sport
- Country: Italy
- Sport: Athletics
- Event: High jump
- Club: Audacia Record Atletica

Achievements and titles
- Personal best: High jump: 1.92 m (2006)

Elena Meuti (Rome, 26 June 1983) is a female Italian athlete, specializes in the high jump, her personal best of 1.92 m, which is the 6th Italian best performance of all-time.

== Biography ==
The best career result at the international level, it was the 12th place at the 2006 European Championships in Athletics, when in order to qualify to the final, twice had to improve their staff, bringing it to 1.92 m.

The September 22, 2012 is found a positive antidoping (cannabis), after his performance in the final gold A (championship ever on the track), which was held in Modena. In the analyzed sample is found to contain THC Metabolite> DL.

== Achievements ==
Year	Competition	Venue	Position	Event	Notes
Representing Italy
1998	Gymnasiade	Shanghai, China	2nd	High jump	1.77 m
2002	World Junior Championships	Kingston, Jamaica	4th	High jump	1.85 m
2003	European U23 Championships	Bydgoszcz, Poland	11th	High jump	1.84 m
2006	European Championships	Göteborg, Sweden	12th	High jump	1.88 m

== See also ==
- Female two metres club
- Italian all-time top lists - High jump
