= Aileen Wilson =

British high jumper

Personal information
- Born: 30 March 1984 (age 42)

Sport
- Country: Great Britain
- Sport: Athletics
- Event: High jump

Achievements and titles
- Personal best: High jump: 1.87 m (2001)

Aileen Wilson (born 30 March 1984) is a British female high jumper who won an individual gold medal at the Youth World Championships in 2001.
