= Andrey Silnov =

Russian Olympic high jumper

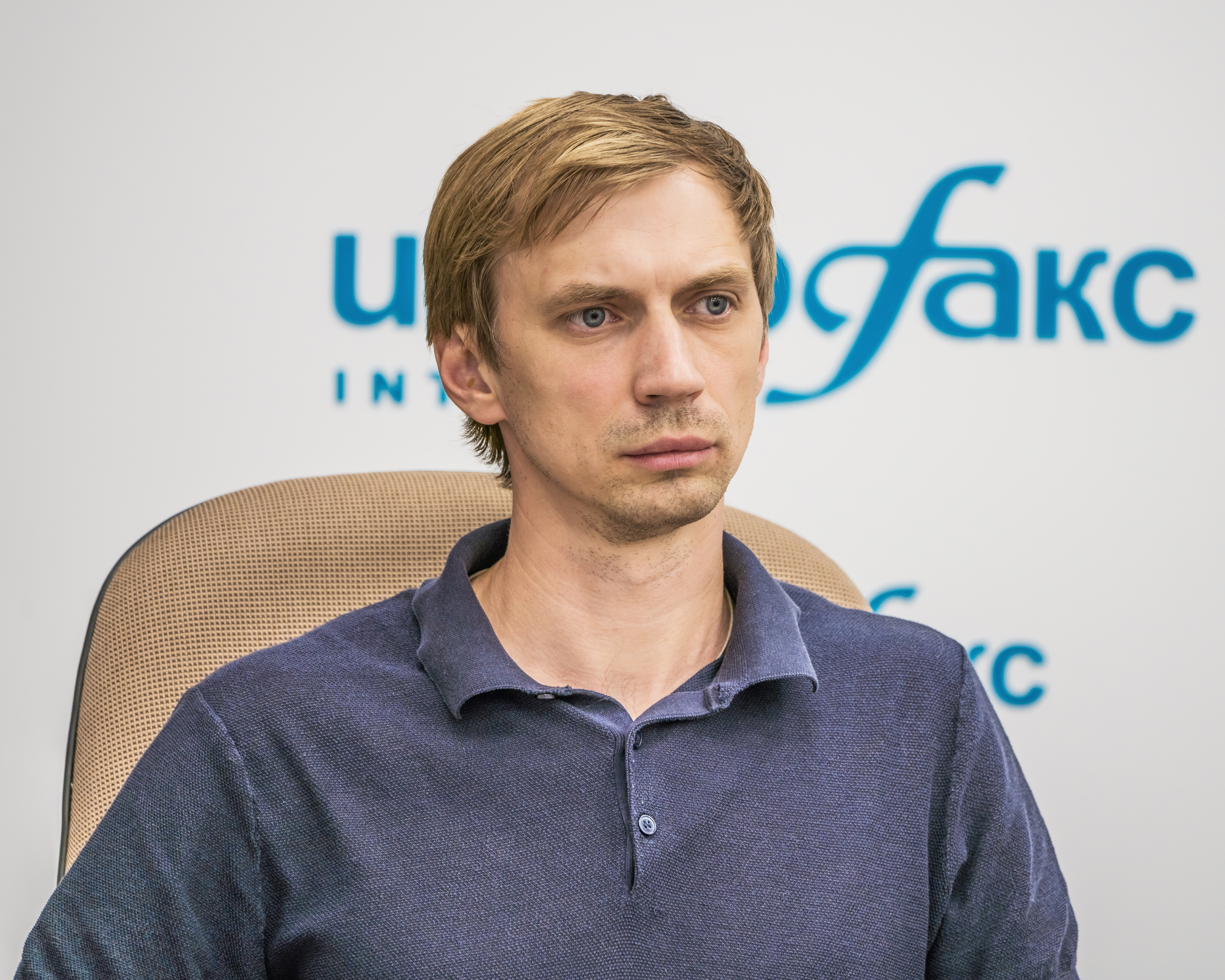
- Silnov in 2018

Personal information
- Nationality: Russia
- Born: 9 September 1984 (age 42) Shakhty, Russian SFSR, Soviet Union
- Height: 1.98 m (6 ft 6 in)
- Weight: 83 kg (183 lb)

Sport
- Sport: Track and field
- Event: High jump
- Club: CSKA Moscow
- Coached by: Sergey Starykh and Yevgeniy Zagorulko
Medal record
Men's athletics
Representing Russia
Olympic Games
Gold medal – first place	2008 Beijing	High jump
World Indoor Championships
Silver medal – second place	2012 Istanbul	High jump
European Championships
Gold medal – first place	2006 Gothenburg	High jump
- Updated on 19 May 2012

Andrey Alexandrovich Silnov (Russian: Андрей Александрович Сильнов; born 9 September 1984) is a Russian high jumper and the 2008 Olympic champion. Born in Shakhty, Rostov Oblast, he is 1.98 m (6 ft 6 in) and weighs 83 kg (183 lbs).

== Biography ==
In a late 2006 interview, Andrey said he was the younger son of working-class parents and that he got into athletics as a boy, inspired by the triple-jumping exploits of an older brother. He quickly realized that his height was an advantage in the high jump. After winning the Russian Under-23 Indoor title in Moscow in 2005 – with a jump of 2.24 m – he was asked to join an elite-level group of Russian jumpers training under coach Yevgeniy Zagorulko.

Silnov burst onto the world scene in 2006, when he won the gold medal at the 2006 European Championships with a jump of 2.36 metres, improving the old championship record which was set by Steinar Hoen with 2.35 m in 1994. A week after the European Championships Silnov jumped 2.37 metres in Monaco. This was the world leading jump in 2006 by a comfortable margin.

Indoors, he has made much of his progression at the Hochsprung mit Musik, setting personal bests in 2006 and 2007 before setting his current best of 2.37 to win the competition.

Silnov was suspended in 2020, backdated to 2013, for doping use, but retained his Olympic gold medal.

=== Olympic champion in 2008 ===
He jumped a new personal best of 2.38, in the London Grand Prix 25 July 2008, and was selected at the last minute to join the Russian team at the 2008 Olympics, where he won the gold medal with a jump of 2.36. His performance in Beijing was astonishing, as he was the only competitor to clear every height on his first attempt and was the only jumper to succeed at 2.36. He then by-passed the Olympic Record of 2.39 and had the bar raised to 2.42, where he missed all three attempts.

=== 2009 and 2010 seasons ===
Silnov's 2009 season was blighted by injury and he was ruled out of competition with an Achilles injury for nearly 12 months. He returned to competition in early 2010.

=== 2011 outdoor season ===
Silnov's first major outdoor competition of 2011 was at the Prefontaine Classic in Eugene, Oregon on Saturday 4 June. This Diamond League invitational brought together an elite field of 8 of the world's best jumpers. Silnov opened at 2.16 (as did every jumper except Spank) and he cleared every height on his first jump, until missing once at 2.32. When none of the three remaining jumpers could clear 2.35, German Raul Spank was the winner on the basis of his first-try clearance at 2.32, Silnov was second, and American Jesse Williams was third (with a third try clearance at 2.32).

=== Post-career and doping ===
In December 2016, Silnov stood to be president of the Russian Athletics Federation (RusAF), but lost the election by 36 votes to 31 to Dmitry Shlyakhtin so took the position of first vice-president instead. In June 2019, Silnov stood down from his position as vice president as he was under investigation for a possible anti-doping rule violation.

Silnov's doping ban was confirmed by the Court of Arbitration for Sport on 7 April 2021 when he was banned for four years with all of his results from 8 July 2013 disqualified. In 2023, he was seen awarding athletes at a Russian domestic competition for which the World Anti-Doping Agency extended his ban for a further year.

== Politics ==
In 2014, Silnov was elected a member of Legislative Assembly of Rostov Region.

== International competitions ==
Year	Competition	Venue	Position	Notes
Representing Russia
2005	European U23 Championships	Erfurt, Germany	9th	2.23 m
2006	European Championships	Gothenburg, Sweden	1st	2.36 m CR, PB
2006	World Athletics Final	Stuttgart, Germany	2nd	2.33 m
2006	World Cup	Athens, Greece	2nd	2.24 m
2007	World Championships	Osaka, Japan	11th	2.21 m
2008	Olympic Games	Beijing, China	1st	2.36 m
2008	World Athletics Final	Stuttgart, Germany	1st	2.35 m CR
2012	World Indoor Championships	Istanbul, Turkey	2nd	2.33 m

Achievements
Preceded by (Sweden) Stefan Holm(i)	Men's High Jump Best Year Performance alongside (Russia) Yaroslav Rybakov (i), (Russia) Ivan Ukhov (i); 2006	Succeeded by (Russia) Ivan Ukhov (i)
Preceded by (Russia) Ivan Ukhov(i)	Men's High Jump Best Year Performance alongside (Russia) Yaroslav Rybakov (i); 2008	Succeeded by (Russia) Ivan Ukhov (i)
