= Yevgeniy Zagorulko =

Russian high jump coach (1942–2021)

Yevgeniy Petrovich Zagorulko (Russian: Eвгений Петрович Загорулько; 26 August 1942 – 3 April 2021) was a Russian high jump coach.

== Biography ==
Zagorulko was born in Tyrma, Verkhnebureinsky District, Khabarovsk Krai, USSR. He belonged to the IAAF Accredited Centre ATC Sochi, where Rodion Gataullin was sports director. He coached Andrey Silnov, Ivan Ukhov, Tamara Bykova, Yelena Yelesina, Sergey Klyugin, Vyacheslav Voronin, Anna Chicherova, Yelena Slesarenko, and Aleksandr Shustov. Some of his athletes later changed coaches, like Ivan Ukhov who changed coach to Sergey Klyugin around January 2009.

Zagorulko died on 3 April 2021, at the age of 78. He had previously been diagnosed with cancer, and had been admitted to hospital in a serious condition with COVID-19 on 2 April 2021. His death was announced by senior coach of the Russian national team Anton Nazarov.
