= Ramona Pop (athlete) =

Romanian athlete

Ramona Pop (born 5 April 1982) is a Romanian athlete and former high jump national champion for her country. She has been junior champion, national champion, and national indoor champion. Her personal best was 1.92m (22 July 2001) and 1.90m indoor (17 February 2002).
