= Heikki Taneli =

Finnish high jumper

Heikki Taneli (born 12 June 1980) is a retired Finnish high jumper.

He finished sixth at the 2005 Summer Universiade and competed at the 2006 European Championships without reaching the final. He became Finnish champion in 2006.

His personal best jump is 2.27 metres, achieved in July 2005 in Pori; and again in July 2006 in Jyväskylä.
