= Blanka Vlašić =

Croatian high jumper

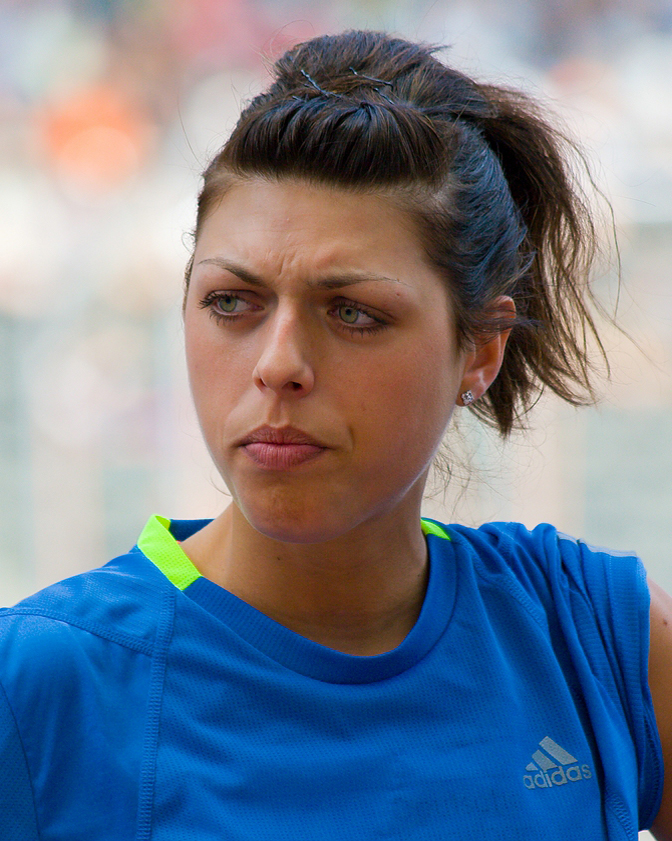
- Vlašić in 2008

Personal information
- Nationality: Croatian
- Born: 8 November 1983 (age 43) Split, SR Croatia, Yugoslavia
- Height: 1.93 m (6 ft 4 in)
- Weight: 71 kg (157 lb)

Sport
- Country: Croatia
- Sport: Athletics
- Event: High jump
- Coached by: Joško Vlašić; Bojan Marinović

Achievements and titles
- Olympic finals: 2nd (2008 Beijing); 3rd (2016 Rio de Janeiro)
- World finals: 1st (2007 Osaka); 1st (2009 Berlin)
- Personal bests: 2.08 m NR (Zagreb 2009); Indoors; 2.06 m NR (Arnstadt 2010)
Medal record
Women's athletics
Representing Croatia
Event	1st	2nd	3rd
Olympic Games	-	1	1
World Championships	2	2	-
World Indoor Championships	2	1	1
European Championships	1	-	-
European Indoor Championships	-	-	-
Total	5	4	2
Olympic Games
Silver medal – second place	2008 Beijing	High jump
Bronze medal – third place	2016 Rio de Janeiro	High jump
World Championships
Gold medal – first place	2007 Osaka	High jump
Gold medal – first place	2009 Berlin	High jump
Silver medal – second place	2011 Daegu	High jump
Silver medal – second place	2015 Beijing	High jump
World Indoor Championships
Gold medal – first place	2008 Valencia	High jump
Gold medal – first place	2010 Doha	High jump
Silver medal – second place	2006 Moscow	High jump
Bronze medal – third place	2004 Budapest	High jump
World Athletics Final
Gold medal – first place	2007 Stuttgart	High jump
Gold medal – first place	2008 Stuttgart	High jump
Gold medal – first place	2009 Thessaloniki	High jump
European Championships
Gold medal – first place	2010 Barcelona	High jump
European U23 Championships
Gold medal – first place	2003 Bydgoszcz	High jump
Mediterranean Games
Gold medal – first place	2001 Tunis	High jump
World Junior Championships
Gold medal – first place	2000 Santiago	High jump
Gold medal – first place	2002 Kingston	High jump
Representing Europe
Continental Cup
Gold medal – first place	2010 Split	High jump
- Updated on 29 July 2017

Blanka Vlašić (Croatian pronunciation: [ˈblaːŋka ˈʋlaʃitɕ]; born 8 November 1983) is a Croatian former track and field athlete who specialised in the high jump. She is a double world champion, an indoor world champion and twice Olympic medallist. Vlašić's personal best of 2.08 m (6 ft 9 3/4 in) is a Croatian record and joint third best mark of all time.

The daughter of Croatian decathlon record holder Joško Vlašić, she was a talented junior athlete and attended her first Olympic Games in 2000 Sydney at the age of sixteen. She won the World Junior Championships in Athletics in both 2000 and 2002. Vlašić broke the Croatia national record in 2004 and also won her first world senior medal at the World Indoor Championships that year. A hyperthyroid condition hindered her second Olympic appearance in Athens and she spent the 2005 season recuperating from surgery.

She returned in 2006, taking the silver at the World Indoor Championships. The 2007 season signalled a strong run of form: she won at the 2007 World Championships, became the indoor world champion in 2008 and her winning streak came to an end with a narrow loss at the Beijing Olympics that year, where she took silver. She became World Champion for the second time in 2009. Her awards also including the IAAF World Athlete of the Year 2010 and the European Athlete of the Year trophy (2007, 2010).

== Biography ==
=== Early life ===
Blanka Vlašić was born on 8 November 1983 in Split, Croatia. From a young age, she was involved in sports: her mother Venera was a seasoned amateur in basketball and cross-country skiing while her father, Joško Vlašić, was an international athlete who broke the Croatian record in the decathlon. Her father brought her to the track while he practised and she dreamed of becoming a professional sprinter. As she grew up she tried a number of sports but found that the high jump was particularly well-suited to her tall and slender frame. Vlašić shunned the idea of competing in more profitable sports, such as basketball, saying that she preferred the thrill of individual sports. She reached the international standard for a high jumper at an early age, setting a personal best of 1.80 metres at fifteen years of age and quickly improving to 1.93 m at sixteen.

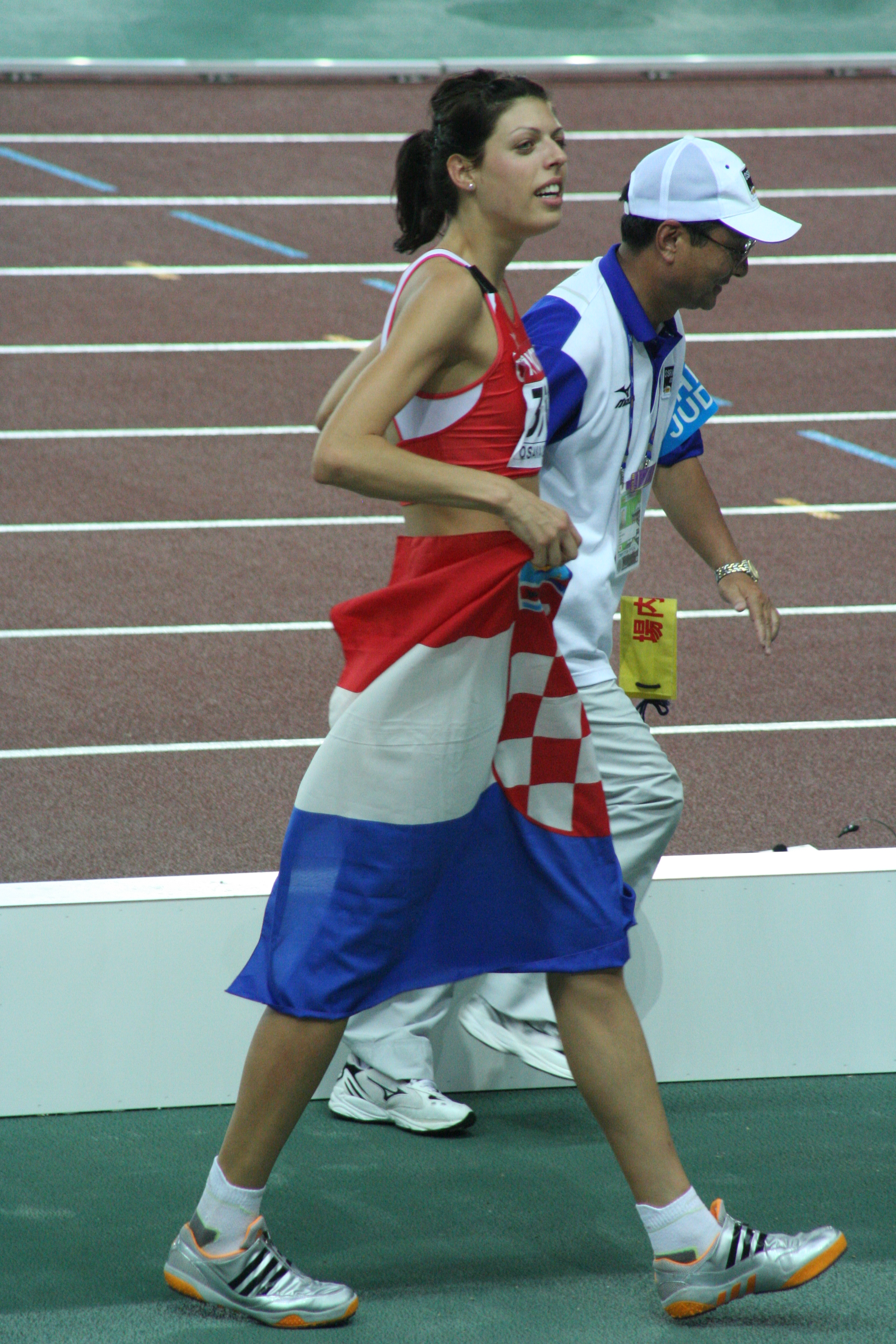
Vlašić quickly became Croatia's top female high jump athlete.

==== Junior career ====
Vlašić had an early start in international competition: she competed at the inaugural World Youth Championships, finishing eighth, and represented her country for the first time at the 2000 Sydney Olympics. Although the Olympics showed that she was not ready to compete at the senior level, she proved herself to be more than proficient at the junior level by winning the 2000 World Junior Championships with a jump of 1.91 m. She was a regular competitor at senior athletics meetings and was steadily improving, qualifying for further top-level senior events. Vlašić finished sixth at the 2001 World Championships in Edmonton with a mark of 1.94 m, a result which led the IAAF's Ed Gordon to mark her out as a future star in the event. She rounded off the year by winning her first senior gold medal at an international tournament, taking first place at the 2001 Mediterranean Games.

The results of Vlašić's final year as a junior showed further development as a high jumper. She set a new indoor best of 1.92 m at the 2002 European Indoor Championships and was the favourite to win the 2002 World Juniors. She won the competition by a margin of nine centimetres, setting a new personal best of 1.96 m and attempting the symbolic two metres height. She failed to pass the bar but remained pleased with her achievements: "This was the first time I tried the 2-metre mark. That would have been a bonus. Today what matters is the gold. I am very happy I retained my world junior title". At the final major event of the season, the European Championships, she could not repeat her previous form and finished in fifth place. Nevertheless, at the end of the year she was ranked in the top ten high jumpers in the world for the season.

=== Rising contender ===
The start to the 2003 athletics season was promising – Vlašić set a new personal best in Linz with a jump of 1.98 m and finished fourth at the World Indoor Championships ten days later, her highest finish in a major world tournament. June and July yielded further progress, jumping 1.98 m again and improving to 1.99 m to win her first IAAF Golden League event at the Gaz de France. Days later, she jumped the two metres height for the first time on home soil at the IAAF Grand Prix Zagreb. Although Hestrie Cloete won the competition overall, Vlašić's defeat of the psychological barrier and improved personal best was the highlight of the meeting and Cloete praised the young athlete's performance. Vlašić took gold at the 2003 European Athletics Under-23 Championships, and then she improved her best by another centimetre at the Zürich Grand Prix which qualified her for the World Championships and the first IAAF World Athletics Final. Despite such previous highs, her season ended on a low note as she failed to win a medal at either the World Championships (finishing seventh with 1.95 m) or the Athletics Final in Paris (ending up fourth with 1.96 m). Although she had failed to reach the podium at the major championships, only three athletes managed to jump higher than her personal and season's best of 2.01 m in 2003.

==== National record and health problems ====
Vlasic started the season well with a bronze medal performance at the 2004 IAAF World Indoor Championships in March. She regularly reached the podium at meetings in the outdoor season and won the 2004 national championships. A Croatian record breaking jump of 2.03 m in Ljubljana put her in good stead for the 2004 Athens Olympics. However, when she competed at the Olympic high jump final she only managed eleventh place with a jump of 1.89 m. Following this, Vlašić did not compete for almost a year: she admitted that she was feeling lethargic and shortly afterwards she was diagnosed with a hyperthyroid condition.

Surgery and recovery ruled out the vast majority of the 2005 athletics season and she only managed to make two competitive appearances. A best of 1.95 m guaranteed her victory at the national championships, but her jump of 1.88 m was not enough to progress into the finals of the 2005 World Championships.

Although her poor health had spoiled her medals chances at the two major championships of 2004 and 2005, Vlašić came back fully recovered and stronger in the 2006 season. She raised her indoor best to 2.05 m (a national record) at a meet in Banská Bystrica in February, and took silver at the 2006 IAAF World Indoor Championships. Although she was beaten to the gold medal by Yelena Slesarenko, she remained positive: "Of course I wanted to win. But when I remember that I was in hospital one year ago it is great." The 2006 European Athletics Championships in Gothenburg proved to be a bittersweet experience: she cleared 2.01 m to finish in fourth place, behind Tia Hellebaut, Venelina Veneva and Kajsa Bergqvist. This was the best-ever non-medal winning jump, and bronze medallist Bergqvist had also finished with 2.01 m but had managed it in fewer attempts. Vlašić capped the season off with an appearance at the 2006 World Athletics Final but withdrew from the competition after her third jump, finishing sixth.

=== 2007: Dominance and Croatia's first gold medal at World Championships ===
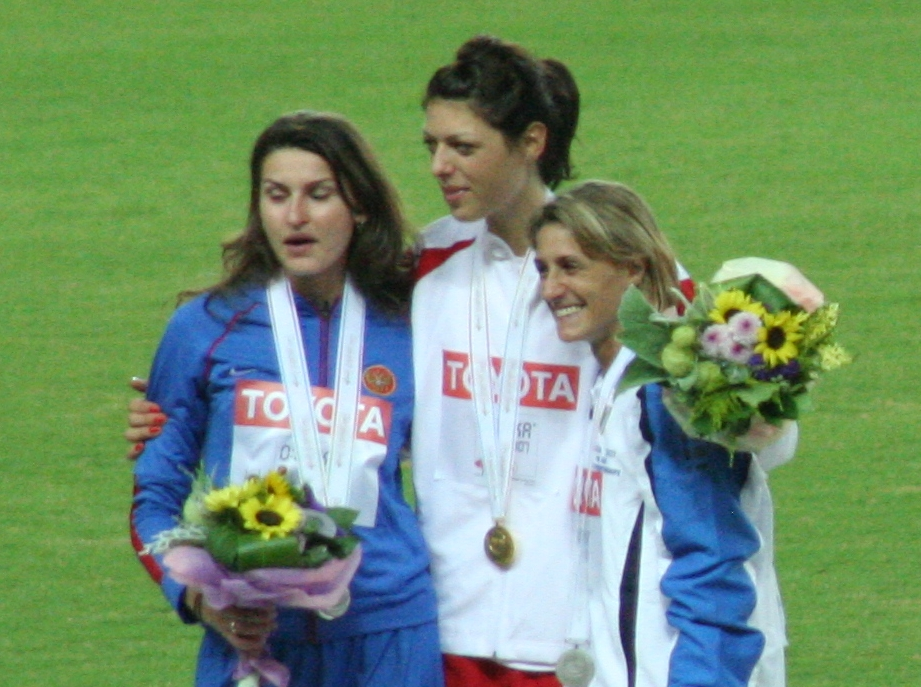
Vlašić receiving her gold medal at the Osaka World Championships

Although she recorded an indoor season's best of 2.01 m in February, she failed to repeat her previous season's indoor form and finished fifth at the 2007 European Athletics Indoor Championships (later upgraded to fourth after Venelina Veneva tested positive for banned substances).

During the 2007 season, Vlašić won eighteen out of nineteen outdoor competitions, with her only loss coming early in the season at the first Golden League meeting in Oslo, defeated by Olympic champion Yelena Slesarenko. Vlašić won the World Championships in Osaka thanks to a 2.05 m jump, winning Croatia's first gold medal at the World Athletics Championships. Antonietta Di Martino of Italy and Anna Chicherova of Russia both cleared 2.03 m to share the silver medal.

In early October, Vlašić was named female European Athlete of the Year by the European Athletic Association after the combined votes of a panel of experts, a group of journalists and the public. She is the first Croatian athlete and the first high jumper to win this award.

=== 2008: Silver medal at the Beijing Olympics ===
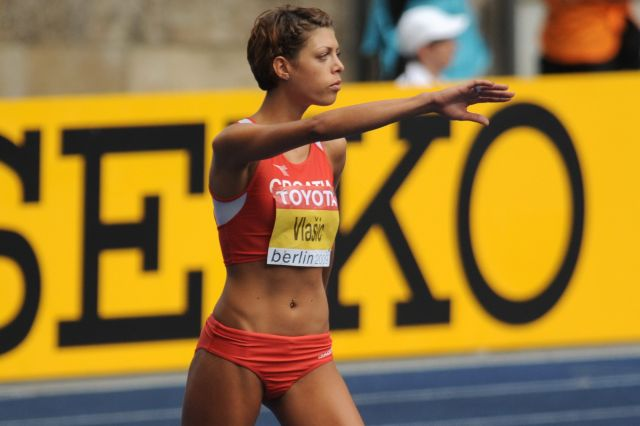
Vlašić preparing to jump at the 2009 World Championships

==== World indoor title in Valencia ====
In March 2008, Vlašić won her first world indoor title in Valencia, Spain (2.03 m) and posted 10 days earlier an indoor national record of 2.05 m.

Coming to the 2008 Summer Olympics, held in Beijing, China, Vlašić jumped 12 times over 2.00 m outdoors, leading the world rankings with 2.06 m. Still based on the world rankings, she leads by 3 centimeters.

==== Beijing Olympics ====
At the Olympics, Vlašić cleared all of her heights on her first attempt, from 1.89 m to 2.03 m. At 2.03 m, Vlašić, Anna Chicherova, and Tia Hellebaut, who had failures at the previous attempts, including at 2.03 for Hellebaut, remained in competition. The bar went to 2.05 m and Vlašić failed her first attempt while Hellebaut broke the Belgian record. Vlašić cleared the bar on her second jump, but lost the gold to Hellebaut on countback after neither cleared 2.07m.

Vlašić's season ended when she was again beaten on countback in the final leg of the ÅF Golden League series, which ended her chances of winning the $1,000,000 jackpot. Having won the previous five Golden League events, she finished the Memorial Van Damme meeting in second place behind Ariane Friedrich.

=== 2009: Second consecutive world title, second best high-jumper of all time (2.08 m) ===
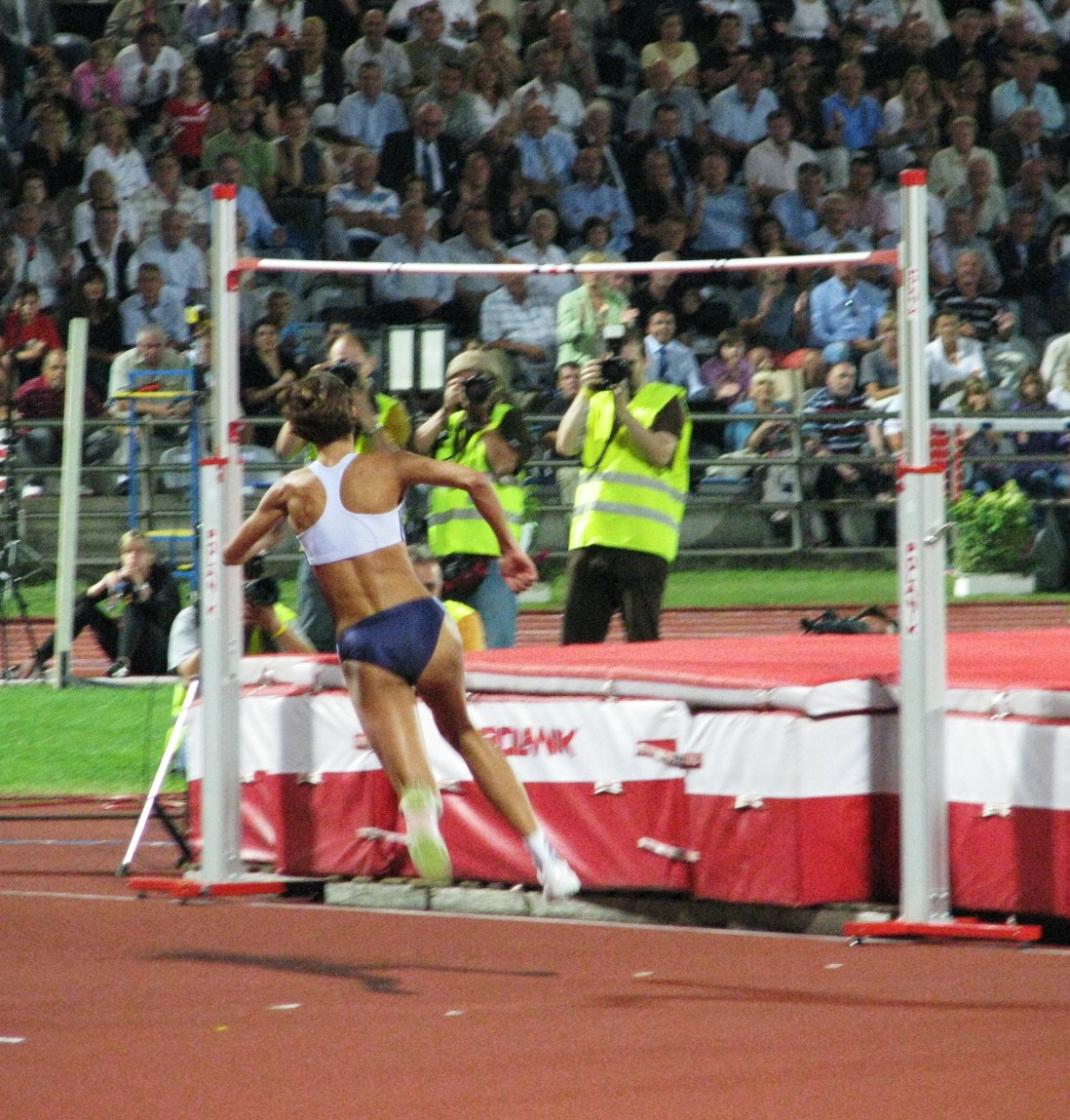
En route to her 2.08 m jump in Zagreb

The 2009 Indoor season saw Vlašić posting a world indoor lead of 2.05 m in Karlsruhe, equalling her own national indoor record in the process. However she failed to earn a medal at the European Indoor Championships in Turin, finishing fifth. Germany's Ariane Friedrich won the gold medal.

At the World Championships, Vlašić competed against Ariane Friedrich. During the final, the duo was joined by reigning world silver and Olympic bronze medalist Anna Chicherova, who took the lead with a 2.02 m first-time clearance. Vlašić cleared on her second attempt, while Friedrich cleared on her third attempt. At 2.04 m, the Croatian is the first one to go over. Chicherova fails and Friedrich attempts 2.06 m, which she almost clears. Vlašić then raised the bar to 2.10 m, a would-be world record, but failed all three attempts.

On 31 August, at Hanžeković Memorial in Zagreb, Vlašić cleared 2.08 m. She set a new personal best, Croatian record and became the second best high-jumper of all time behind the world record of Stefka Kostadinova (2.09 m in 1987). She raised the bar to 2.10 m, but failed once again.

=== 2010: World indoor title and first European title ===
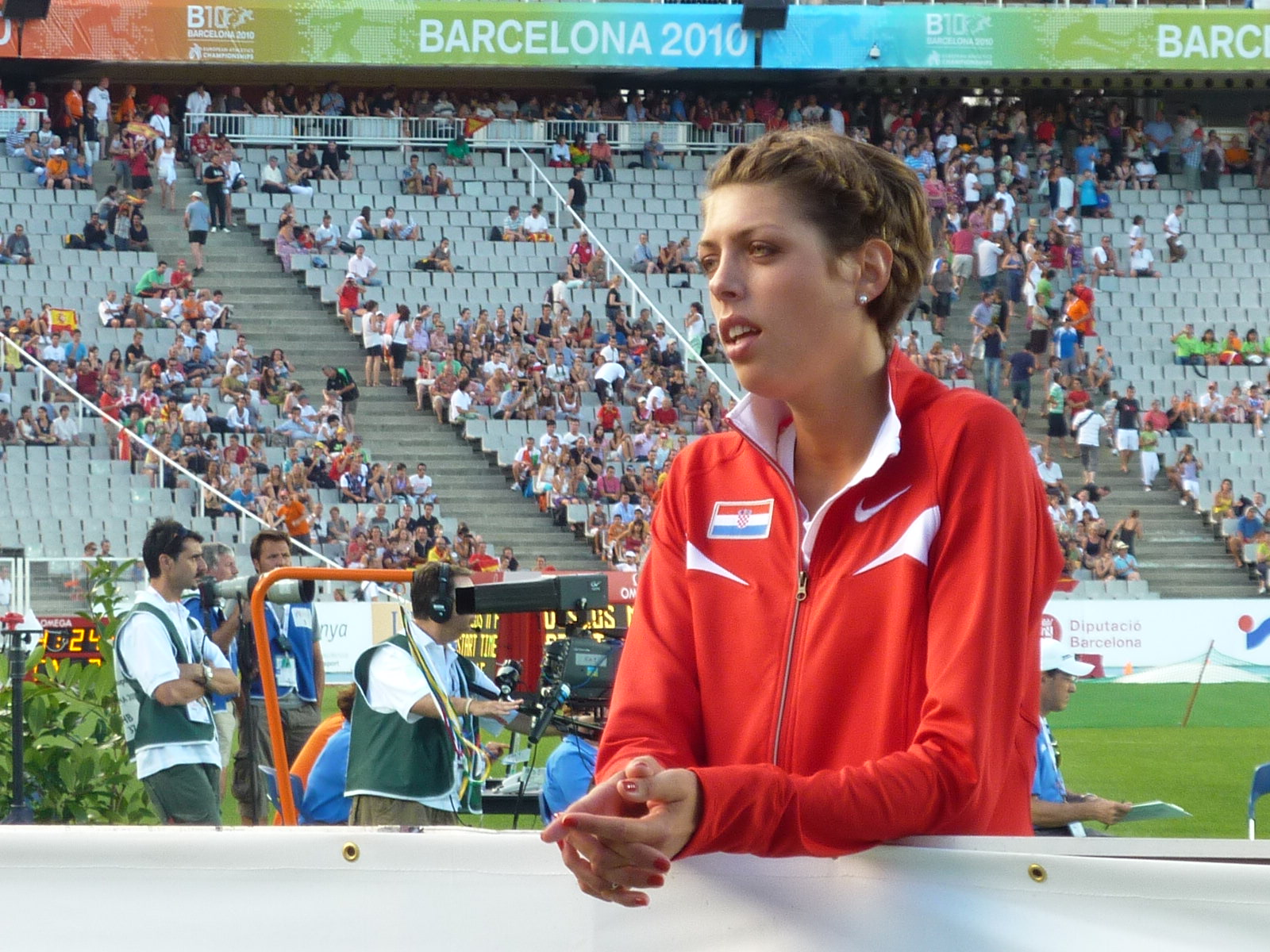
Blanka Vlašić at the 2010 European Championships in Barcelona

On 6 February 2010, Vlašić cleared 2.06 m in Arnstadt, Germany. The victory at the Hochsprung mit Musik added one centimetre to her own personal best and Croatian record and brought her to third on the all-time indoor lists behind Sweden's Kajsa Bergqvist (2.08 m in 2006) and Germany's Heike Henkel (2,07 m in 1992). A month later, she retained her world indoor title in Doha with 2.00 m, winning ahead of Spain's Ruth Beitia and USA's Chaunté Lowe, both jumping 1.98 m. Through the outdoor season, she wins the first edition of the IAAF Diamond League by winning the seven meetings in the event. She and her main rival of the season Chaunté Lowe both led the circuit. Vlašić cleared 2.00 m on six out of seven occasions in the circuit.

On 1 August 2010 Vlašić won her first European title with 2.03 m, equalling the championship record set by Belgian's Tia Hellebaut and Bulgaria's Venelina Veneva-Mateeva four years earlier at the 2006 edition in Gothenburg. She beat Sweden's Emma Green (silver) and Germany's Ariane Friedrich (bronze), both jumping 2.01 m.

Vlašić was selected along with Emma Green to represent Europe at the Continental Cup on her home soil of Split. She won the event with 2.05 m and equalled Chaunté Lowe's world leading jump. She raised the bar at 2.10 m, what would be a world record, but failed to break it.

At the end of the year, Vlašić was crowned European Athlete and IAAF World Athlete of the year, succeeding to Marta Domínguez (Europe) and Sanya Richards-Ross (World).

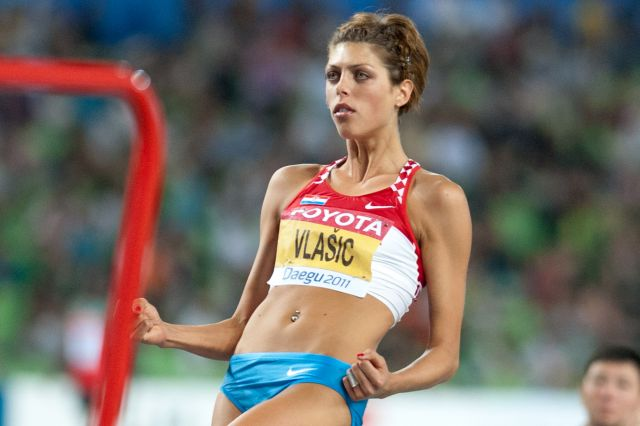
Blanka Vlašić at the 2011 World Championships where she earned the silver medal

==== 2011 season: third world championships medal ====
Coming up to the 2011 World Championships in Daegu, Vlašić wasn't the favourite at all. With 2.00 m, she wasn't leading the world rankings and Russian long time rival Anna Chicherova had all the expectations for the win, thanks to a Russian record of 2.07 m. Italy's Antonietta Di Martino is also in a good shape coming to the Worlds, having (as Vlašić) jumped 2.00 m outdoors but did better indoors with an Italian record of 2.04 m. Moreover, Vlašić was not guaranteed to show up at the championships due to a left leg injury. However, during the championships, she showed great form and managed to clear 2.03 m and earn silver medal, coming close to clearing 2.05 and creating history to become the first high jumper to win 3 consecutive world titles. But Anna Chicherova beat the Croatian on countbacks, while Antonietta Di Martino has to settle for the bronze with 2.00 m.

=== 2012-2013: injuries ===
Vlašić decided to have an operation on her left Achilles tendon in January 2012. Although the operation in itself seemed to have gone well, an infection developed and she had to have another operation in April. A slow healing process delayed her preparations for the London Olympics and she had to withdraw. Vlašić did not compete in any other event of the season, therefore missing the whole indoor and outdoor season of 2012.

20 months after her last competition, Vlašić made her comeback on 25 May in New York, taking the win with the World Championships standard of 1.94 m. Then, she jumped 1.95 m in Rome before clearing 2 meters at the end of June in Buhl while working on gaining stability in her ankle as she approached the 2013 Moscow World Championships. Unfortunately she had to withdraw due to fear that she had not yet fully recovered.

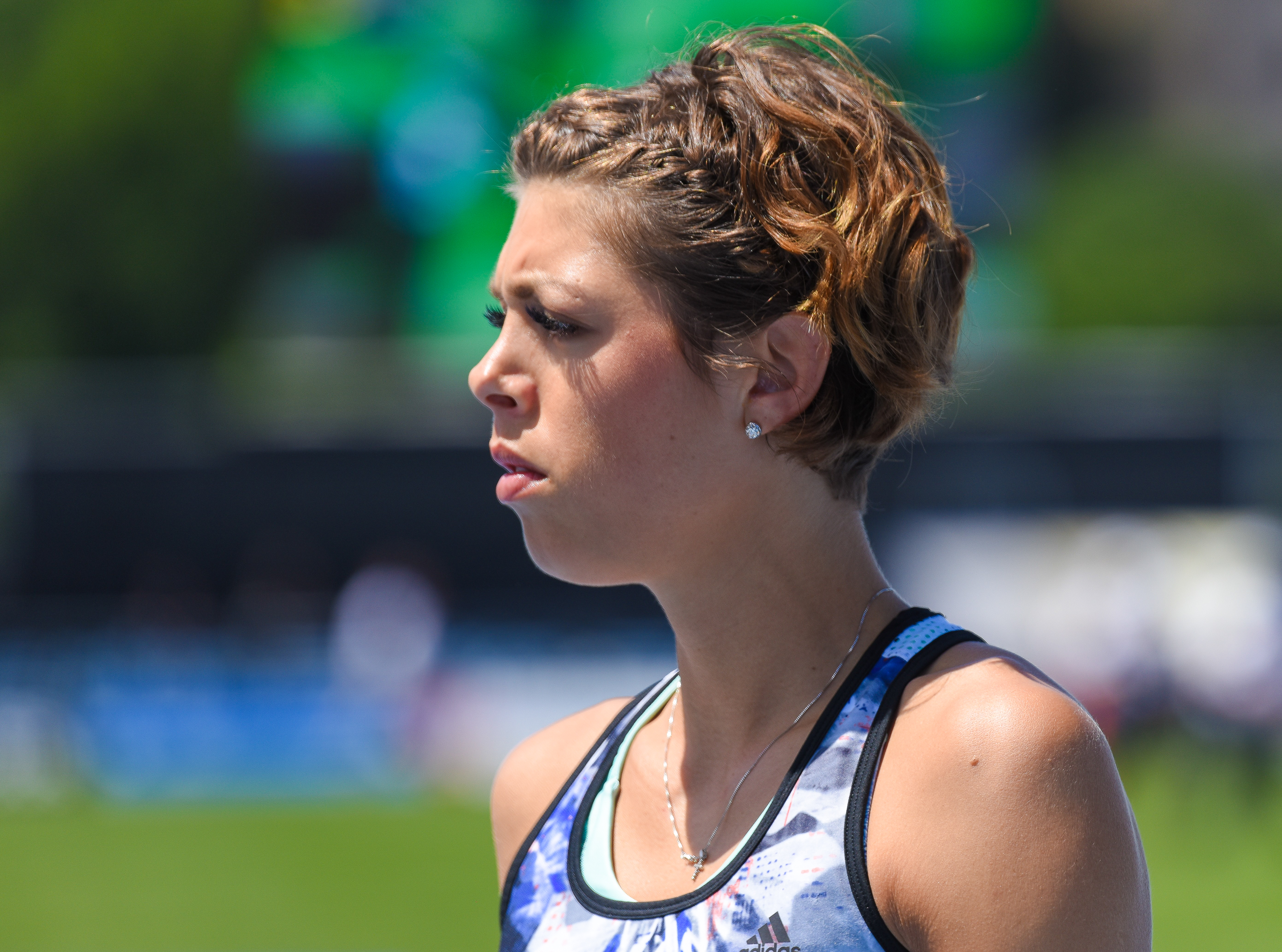
Vlašić in New York in 2015

=== 2015 World Championships ===
In March 2014, Vlašić made her comeback at an international championship since the 2011 World Championships at the World Indoor Championships. She placed 6th with 1.94 m. Due to a jumper's knee injury in her left knee, she had to withdraw from the European championships in Zürich where she was one of the favorites alongside Russia's Mariya Kuchina, due to her two recent wins in Paris and London with 2.00 m.

However, she came back on the scene a week after the Europeans at the Weltklasse Zürich and placed fourth with 1.93 m. She ended her season on a good note, jumping that height again in Zagreb.

In 2015, Vlašić opened her outdoor season at the Golden Gala in Rome and placed 2nd to Spain's Ruth Beitia (2.00 m, world lead) with 1.97 m. Then she equaled that height in New York City, again beaten by the Spaniard on countbacks. However, due to her chronic foot pain, she cancelled her appearances in both Lausanne and Monaco in order to get ready for the Beijing World Championships.

The World Champs were the Croatian's first major championship outdoors since Daegu 2011. On 27 August, she made it to the finals and there, two days later, earned the silver medal behind Russia's Mariya Lasitskene (former Kuchina) who beat her on countbacks (Vlašić had one miss at 1.92 m). To her, the silver medal felt like gold after all she had to go through in the previous years, and more specifically recalling she could not walk for days in early July.

=== 2016: Olympic bronze ===
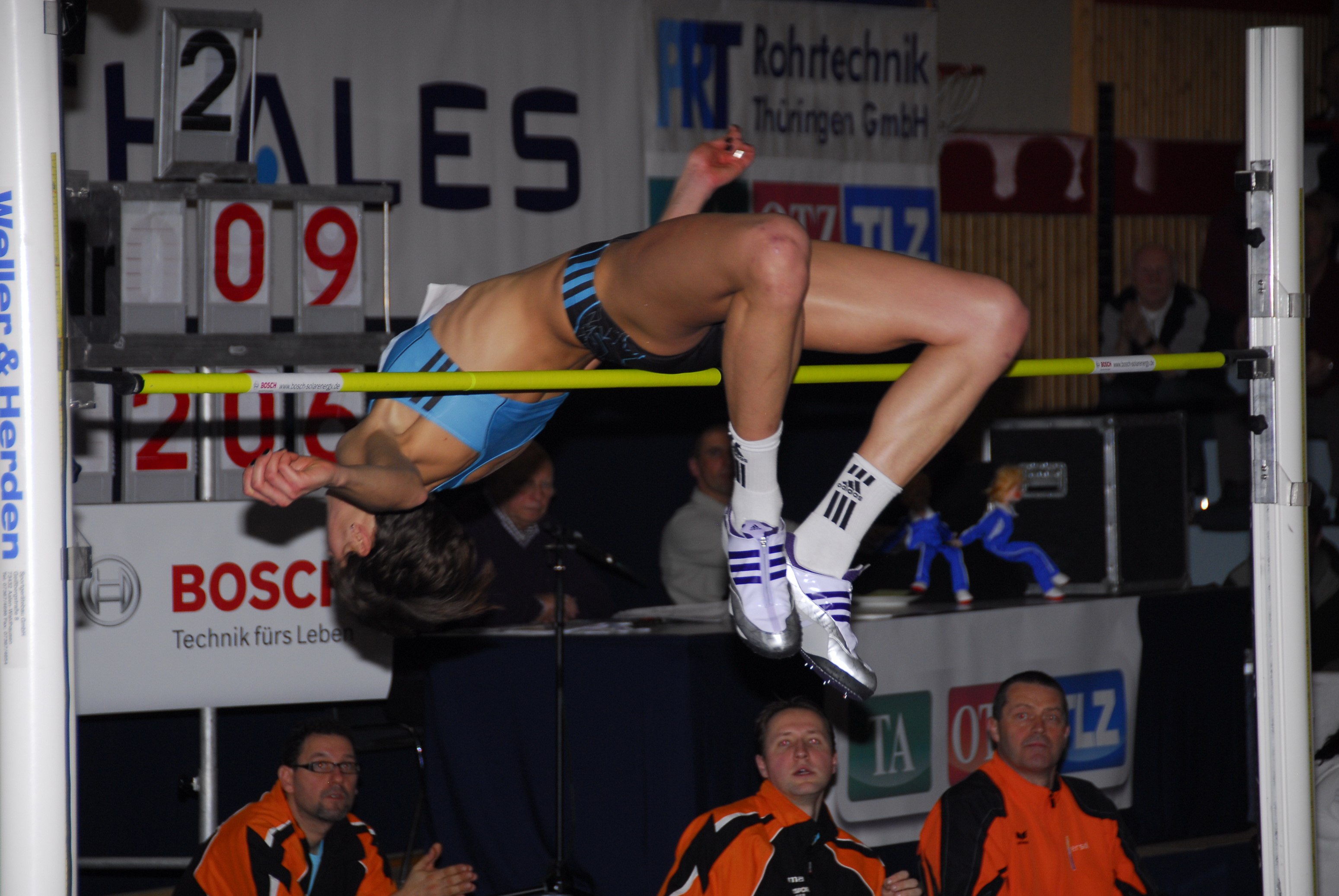
Blanka Vlašić en route to her 2.06 m jump in Arnstadt, 2010 (2.06, NIR)

Still due to her Achilles problem, Vlašić only made one appearance in the 2016 season in Split on 29 January where she took the win with 1.95 m, jumping over the qualifying standard (1.93 m) for the 2016 Summer Olympics. On 3 February, she had surgery in Turku, Finland. Despite having not competed during the outdoor season (she cancelled her participation at the European Championships and in the London Diamond League), she was selected by the Croatian Federation alongside Ana Šimić to represent Croatia in the high jump at the Olympics.

==== Olympic competition ====
On 18 August, Vlašić competed in the Women's high jump qualification and reached the finals, placing 1st with the qualifying height for the final, 1.94 m. Two days later, she competed in a final of 17 competitors. She cleared 1.88 m and 1.93 m on her second attempt, before clearing 1.97 m. She, Ruth Beitia, Mirela Demireva and Chaunté Lowe were the only athletes to clear the bar. Placing third behind Beitia and Demireva but ahead of Lowe, Vlašić attempted 2.00 m but failed to clear within three attempts. As no one else cleared, she earned the bronze medal behind Beitia and Demireva. This was the first time since the 1980 Summer Olympics that the winning height was below 2.00 meters. Vlašić became the seventh female athlete in the history of the discipline (since 1928) to win two Olympic medals. Vlasić donated her medal to the Croatian shrine of St. Mary of Marija Bistrica.

=== Career post-Olympic season ===
On 19 July 2017, Vlašić announced her withdrawal from the World Championships in London due to foot pain. She said that she had no plans to retire yet as she planned to come back for the 2018 season on the road to the 2020 Summer Olympics in Tokyo.

On 19 February 2021, she announced her retirement.

== Statistics ==
=== Personal bests ===
Event		Mark	Venue	Date
High jump	Outdoor	2.08 m NR	Zagreb, Croatia	31 August 2009
High jump	Indoor	2.06 m NR	Arnstadt, Germany	6 February 2010

=== International competitions ===
Representing Croatia
Year	Competition	Venue	Position	Notes
2000	World Junior Championships	Santiago, Chile	1st	1.91 m
2001	World Championships	Edmonton, Canada	6th	1.94 m
2001	Mediterranean Games	Tunis, Tunisia	1st	1.90 m
2002	World Junior Championships	Kingston, Jamaica	1st	1.96 m
2002	European Championships	Munich, Germany	5th	1.89 m
2003	World Indoor Championships	Birmingham, United Kingdom	4th	1.96 m
2003	European U23 Championships	Bydgoszcz, Poland	1st	1.98 m
2003	World Championships	Paris, France	7th	1.95 m
2003	World Athletics Final	Monte Carlo, Monaco	4th	1.96 m
2004	World Indoor Championships	Budapest, Hungary	3rd	1.97 m
2004	Olympic Games	Athens, Greece	11th	1.89 m
2006	World Indoor Championships	Moscow, Russia	2nd	2.00 m
2006	European Championships	Gothenburg, Sweden	4th	2.01 m
2006	World Athletics Final	Stuttgart, Germany	6th	1.90 m
2007	European Indoor Championships	Birmingham, United Kingdom	4th	1.92 m
2007	World Championships	Osaka, Japan	1st	2.05 m
2007	World Athletics Final	Stuttgart, Germany	1st	2.00 m
2008	World Indoor Championships	Valencia, Spain	1st	2.03 m
2008	Olympic Games	Beijing, China	2nd	2.05 m
2008	World Athletics Final	Stuttgart, Germany	1st	2.01 m
2009	World Championships	Berlin, Germany	1st	2.04 m
2009	World Athletics Final	Thessaloniki, Greece	1st	2.04 m
2010	World Indoor Championships	Doha, Qatar	1st	2.00 m
2010	European Championships	Barcelona, Spain	1st	2.03 m
2010	Diamond League		1st	details
2011	World Championships	Daegu, South Korea	2nd	2.03 m
2011	Diamond League		1st	details
2014	World Indoor Championships	Sopot, Poland	6th	1.94 m
2014	Diamond League		3rd	details
2015	World Championships	Beijing, China	2nd	2.01 m
2016	Olympic Games	Rio de Janeiro, Brazil	3rd	1.97 m

== Personal life ==
Vlašić was named after Casablanca, a city where her father competed and won a gold medal at the 1983 Mediterranean Games around the time of her birth.

From the beginning of her career she has been coached by her father, Joško Vlašić and a former high jumper Bojan Marinović.

Her brother is Croatian football player Nikola Vlašić.

Blanka is today a member of the 'Champions for Peace' club, a group of 54 famous elite athletes committed to serving peace in the world through sport, created by Peace and Sport, a Monaco-based international organisation. Vlašić supported the Croatian constitutional referendum in 2013 stating that marriage is matrimony between a woman and a man. She is a devout Roman Catholic.

On 26 May 2022 Vlašić announced on Instagram that she had married Belgian sports journalist Ruben Van Gucht and that she was pregnant with the couple's child.

Awards
Preceded by Carolina Klüft; Marta Domínguez	Women's European Athlete of the Year; 2007; 2010	Succeeded by Yelena Isinbayeva; Mariya Savinova
Preceded by Sanya Richards	IAAF World Athlete of the Year; 2010	Succeeded by Sally Pearson
Preceded by Sanya Richards	Women's Track & Field Athlete of the Year; 2010	Succeeded by Vivian Cheruiyot
Sporting positions
Preceded by Kajsa Bergqvist	Women's High Jump Best Year Performance; 2007–2010	Succeeded by Anna Chicherova
