= Niki Palli =

Israeli high jumper

Nikita "Niki" Palli
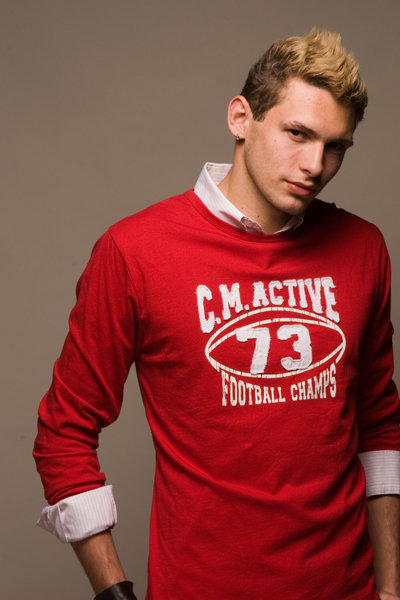

Personal information
- Native name: ניקיטה (ניקי) פאלי
- Nickname: Niki
- National team: Israel
- Born: 28 May 1987 (age 39)

Sport
- Country: Israel
- Sport: Athletics
- Event: High Jump

Achievements and titles
- Regional finals: 6th (2006)
- Personal best: 2.30 m
Medal record
World U20 Championships
Silver medal – second place	2006 Beijing	high Jump
European U20 Championships
Bronze medal – third place	2005 Kaunas	high Jump

Nikita ("Niki") Palli (Hebrew: ניקיטה (ניקי) פאלי; born 28 May 1987 in Moldova) is an Israeli athlete competing in the high jump.

== Biography ==
At the age of 8, Niki Palli moved with his family from Moldova to Israel. In 2005 Palli became an Israeli citizen.

== Sports career ==
In 2005, Palli improved his personal best from 2.09 to 2.25 meters and became Israeli champion in high jump.

At the 2006 European Athletics Championships in Gothenburg he finished sixth, after achieving 2.27 meters. At the 2006 World Junior Championships in Beijing he finished 2nd, jumping 2.29 meters. His current personal best is 2.30 meters, achieved on July 12, 2006, in the 2006 Israel athletics championships in Tel Aviv. This is the Israeli junior record and second-best performance for an Israeli high jumper. The record is held by Konstantin Matusevich with 2.36 meters.

At the 2007 European Athletics Indoor Championships he finished eighth and last in the final, only clearing 2.15 metres.

He cleared a season best 2.27 meters twice in July and qualified for 2008 Summer Olympics.

He competed on behalf of Israel at the 2008 Summer Olympics in Beijing, China.

He tied for the silver medal in the high jump at the 2017 Maccabiah Games, jumping 2.05 meters.

== See also ==
- Sports in Israel
