= 2008 IAAF World Athletics Final – Results =

These are the results of the 2008 IAAF World Athletics Final, which took place in at the Gottlieb-Daimler-Stadion in Stuttgart, Germany on 13–14 September.

The year's top seven athletes, based on their points ranking of the 2008 IAAF World Athletics Tour, qualified to compete in each event, with an extra four athletes selected for races of 1500 metres and above. One additional athlete, a wildcard, was allocated to each event by the IAAF and replacement athletes were admitted to replace the qualified athletes that could not attend the final.

== Track ==
Key

Wild card athlete

Events
100 m	200 m	400 m	800 m	1500 m	3000 m	5000 m	110/100 m h	400 m h	3000 m st

=== 100 metres ===
Men's
Rank	Athlete	Nation	Time (sec)	Reaction time	Notes
1	Asafa Powell	Jamaica (JAM)	9.87	0.153	
2	Nesta Carter	Jamaica (JAM)	10.07	0.154	
3	Michael Frater	Jamaica (JAM)	10.10	0.137	
4	Kim Collins	Saint Kitts and Nevis (SKN)	10.22	0.152	
5	Marc Burns	Trinidad and Tobago (TTO)	10.22	0.153	
6	Mike Rodgers	United States (USA)	10.27	0.182	
7	Ronald Pognon	France (FRA)	10.27	0.121	
8	Marlon Devonish	Great Britain (GBR)	10.37	0.140	

Women's
Rank	Athlete	Nation	Time (sec)	Reaction time	Notes
1	Shelly-Ann Fraser-Pryce	Jamaica (JAM)	10.94	0.180	
2	Kerron Stewart	Jamaica (JAM)	11.06	0.169	
3	Marshevet Myers	United States (USA)	11.06	0.152	
4	Carmelita Jeter	United States (USA)	11.21	0.171	
5	Torri Edwards	United States (USA)	11.22	0.153	
6	Lauryn Williams	United States (USA)	11.22	0.154	
7	Chandra Sturrup	Bahamas (BAH)	11.23	0.136	
8	Debbie Ferguson-McKenzie	Bahamas (BAH)	11.25	0.155	

=== 200 metres ===
Men's
Rank	Athlete	Nation	Time (sec)	Reaction time	Notes
1	Stéphane Buckland	Mauritius (MRI)	20.57	0.149	
2	Paul Hession	Ireland (IRL)	20.58	0.160	
3	Brendan Christian	Netherlands Antilles (ANT)	20.61	0.153	
4	Christopher Williams	Jamaica (JAM)	20.66	0.162	
5	Rodney Martin	United States (USA)	20.66	0.164	
6	Brian Dzingai	Zimbabwe (ZIM)	20.88	0.185	
7	Marlon Devonish	Great Britain (GBR)	21.02	0.151	
8	Joel Brown	United States (USA)	21.23	0.139	

Women's
Rank	Athlete	Nation	Time (sec)	Reaction time	Notes
1	Sanya Richards-Ross	United States (USA)	22.50	0.156	
2	Marshevet Myers	United States (USA)	22.69	0.182	
3	Kerron Stewart	Jamaica (JAM)	22.72	0.162	
4	Debbie Ferguson-McKenzie	Bahamas (BAH)	22.89	0.163	
5	Carmelita Jeter	United States (USA)	22.98	0.170	
6	Lauryn Williams	United States (USA)	23.30	0.185	
7	Yulia Gushchina	Russia (RUS)	23.37	0.148	
8	Muriel Hurtis	France (FRA)	23.43	0.148	

=== 400 metres ===
Men's
Rank	Athlete	Nation	Time (sec)	Reaction time	Notes
1	LaShawn Merritt	United States (USA)	44.50	0.144	
2	Jeremy Wariner	United States (USA)	44.51	0.175	
3	Chris Brown	Bahamas (BAH)	45.36	0.133	
4	Angelo Taylor	United States (USA)	45.37	0.161	
5	Martyn Rooney	Great Britain (GBR)	45.82	0.179	
6	Gary Kikaya	DR Congo (COD)	45.92	0.167	
7	Kamghe Gaba	Germany (GER)	46.22	0.209	
8	Johan Wissman	Sweden (SWE)	46.48	0.174	

Women's
Rank	Athlete	Nation	Time (sec)	Reaction time	Notes
1	Sanya Richards-Ross	United States (USA)	50.41	0.173	
2	Christine Ohuruogu	Great Britain (GBR)	50.83	0.234	
3	Novlene Williams-Mills	Jamaica (JAM)	51.30	0.231	
4	Amantle Montsho	Botswana (BOT)	51.54	0.387	
5	Shericka Williams	Jamaica (JAM)	51.55	0.231	
6	Mary Wineberg	United States (USA)	51.65	0.263	
7	Tatyana Firova	Russia (RUS)	51.85	0.192	
8	Shereefa Lloyd	Jamaica (JAM)	51.86	0.206	

=== 800 metres ===
Men's
Rank	Athlete	Nation	Time (min)	Notes
1	Alfred Kirwa Yego	Kenya (KEN)	1:49.05	
2	Abraham Chepkirwok	Uganda (UGA)	1:49.22	
3	Yusuf Saad Kamel	Bahrain (BHR)	1:49.40	
4	Marcin Lewandowski	Poland (POL)	1:49.40	
5	Amine Laalou	Morocco (MAR)	1:50.03	
6	Mbulaeni Mulaudzi	South Africa (RSA)	1:50.70	
7	Richard Kiplagat	Kenya (KEN)	1:50.75	
8	Steffen Co	Germany (GER)	1:55.69	

Women's
Rank	Athlete	Nation	Time (min)	Notes
1	Pamela Jelimo	Kenya (KEN)	1:56.23	CR
2	Janeth Jepkosgei Busienei	Kenya (KEN)	1:58.41	
3	Marilyn Okoro	Great Britain (GBR)	1:58.64	
4	Kenia Sinclair	Jamaica (JAM)	1:58.85	
5	Lucia Klocová	Slovakia (SVK)	2:00.05	
6	Elisa Cusma Piccione	Italy (ITA)	2:00.12	
7	Jennifer Meadows	Great Britain (GBR)	2:00.80	
8	Yuliya Krevsun	Ukraine (UKR)	2:04.44	

=== 1500 metres ===
Men's
Rank	Athlete	Nation	Time (min)	Notes
1	Haron Keitany	Kenya (KEN)	3:37.92	
2	Asbel Kiprop	Kenya (KEN)	3:37.93	
3	Nicholas Willis	New Zealand (NZL)	3:38.22	
4	Gideon Mwangi Gathimba	Kenya (KEN)	3:38.35	
5	Yusuf Saad Kamel	Bahrain (BHR)	3:38.50	
6	Bernard Lagat	United States (USA)	3:38.79	
7	Belal Ali Mansoor	Bahrain (BHR)	3:39.62	
8	Mohamed Moustaoui	Morocco (MAR)	3:39.90	
9	Abdalaati Iguider	Morocco (MAR)	3:41.70	
10	Nicholas Kiptanui Kemboi	Kenya (KEN)	3:43.91	
—	Deresse Mekonnen	Ethiopia (ETH)	DNS	

Women's
Rank	Athlete	Nation	Time (min)	Notes
1	Maryam Yusuf Jamal	Bahrain (BHR)	4:06.59	
2	Gelete Burka	Ethiopia (ETH)	4:07.45	
3	Iryna Lishchynska	Ukraine (UKR)	4:07.65	
4	Lisa Dobriskey	Great Britain (GBR)	4:07.72	
5	Shannon Rowbury	United States (USA)	4:08.16	
6	Nuria Fernández	Spain (ESP)	4:08.24	
7	Sylwia Ejdys	Poland (POL)	4:08.56	
8	Erin Donohue	United States (USA)	4:08.64	
9	Sarah Jamieson	Australia (AUS)	4:09.21	
10	Agnes Samaria	Namibia (NAM)	4:12.20	
11	Btissam Lakhouad	Morocco (MAR)	4:18.68	

=== 3000 metres ===
Men's
Rank	Athlete	Nation	Time (min)	Notes
1	Bernard Lagat	United States (USA)	8:02.97	SB
2	Edwin Cheruiyot Soi	Kenya (KEN)	8:03.55	
3	Matthew Tegenkamp	United States (USA)	8:03.56	
4	Mike Kipruto Kigen	Kenya (KEN)	8:03.63	
5	James Kwalia C'Kurui	Qatar (QAT)	8:04.07	
6	Mark Kosgei Kiptoo	Kenya (KEN)	8:04.30	
7	Chris Solinsky	United States (USA)	8:04.78	
8	Abraham Chebii	Kenya (KEN)	8:05.87	
9	Mohamed Farah	Great Britain (GBR)	8:05.97	
10	Isaac Kiprono Songok	Kenya (KEN)	8:06.33	
11	Boniface Kiprotich Songok	Kenya (KEN)	8:07.59	
12	Shadrack Kosgei	Kenya (KEN)	8:09.41	

Women's
Rank	Athlete	Nation	Time (min)	Notes
1	Meseret Defar	Ethiopia (ETH)	8:43.60	SB
2	Vivian Jepkemoi Cheruiyot	Kenya (KEN)	8:44.64	
3	Jane Jepkosgei Kiptoo	Kenya (KEN)	8:47.65	
4	Zakia Mrisho	Tanzania (TAN)	8:49.41	
5	Linet Chepkwemoi Masai	Kenya (KEN)	8:49.66	
6	Sylvia Jebiwott Kibet	Kenya (KEN)	8:50.55	
7	Stephanie Twell	Great Britain (GBR)	8:50.89	PB
8	Wude Ayalew	Ethiopia (ETH)	8:52.99	
9	Laura Whittle	Great Britain (GBR)	8:59.73	
10	Viola Jelagat Kibiwot	Kenya (KEN)	9:04.20	SB
11	Sara Slattery	United States (USA)	9:16.24	

=== 5000 metres ===
Men's
Rank	Athlete	Nation	Time (min)	Notes
1	Edwin Cheruiyot Soi	Kenya (KEN)	13:22.81	
2	Moses Ndiema Kipsiro	Uganda (UGA)	13:23.02	
3	Micah Kipkemboi Kogo	Kenya (KEN)	13:23.37	
4	Mark Kosgei Kiptoo	Kenya (KEN)	13:23.73	
5	Eliud Kipchoge	Kenya (KEN)	13:24.13	
6	Tariku Bekele	Ethiopia (ETH)	13:24.75	
7	Silas Kipruto	Kenya (KEN)	13:25.21	
8	Boniface Toroitich Kiprop	Uganda (UGA)	13:36.33	
9	Bernard Kiprop Kipyego	Kenya (KEN)	13:41.43	
10	Moses Ndiema Masai	Kenya (KEN)	13:46.04	
—	Markos Geneti	Ethiopia (ETH)	DNS	
—	Ali Abdosh	Ethiopia (ETH)	DNS	

Women's
Rank	Athlete	Nation	Time (min)	Notes
1	Meseret Defar	Ethiopia (ETH)	14:53.82	
2	Vivian Jepkemoi Cheruiyot	Kenya (KEN)	14:54.60	
3	Meselech Melkamu	Ethiopia (ETH)	14:58.76	
4	Linet Chepkwemoi Masai	Kenya (KEN)	14:58.88	
5	Priscah Jepleting Cherono	Kenya (KEN)	14:59.74	
6	Sylvia Jebiwott Kibet	Kenya (KEN)	15:00.03	SB
7	Grace Kwamboka Momanyi	Kenya (KEN)	15:02.44	
8	Jane Jepkosgei Kiptoo	Kenya (KEN)	15:03.80	PB
9	Lucy Wangui Kabuu	Kenya (KEN)	15:09.69	
10	Zakia Mrisho	Tanzania (TAN)	15:21.68	
11	Peninah Biwott Jepchumba	Kenya (KEN)	15:37.73	
—	Ejegayehu Dibaba	Ethiopia (ETH)	DNS	

=== 110/100 metres hurdles ===
Men's
Rank	Athlete	Nation	Time (sec)	Reaction time	Notes
1	David Oliver	United States (USA)	13.22	0.181	
2	Petr Svoboda	Czech Republic (CZE)	13.33	0.191	
3	Ryan Wilson	United States (USA)	13.54	0.163	
4	Aries Merritt	United States (USA)	13.56	0.156	
5	Marcel van der Westen	Netherlands (NED)	13.57	0.136	
6	Tyron Akins	United States (USA)	13.62	0.150	
7	Andy Turner	Great Britain (GBR)	13.68	0.125	
8	Joel Brown	United States (USA)	13.81	0.139	

Women's
Rank	Athlete	Nation	Time (sec)	Reaction time	Notes
1	LoLo Jones	United States (USA)	12.56	0.128	
2	Delloreen Ennis-London	Jamaica (JAM)	12.56	0.148	
3	Dawn Harper Nelson	United States (USA)	12.67	0.182	
4	Brigitte Foster-Hylton	Jamaica (JAM)	12.76	0.137	
5	Priscilla Lopes-Schliep	Canada (CAN)	12.81	0.139	
6	Sally Pearson	Australia (AUS)	12.82	0.137	
7	Joanna Hayes	United States (USA)	13.06	0.156	
—	Josephine Onyia	Spain (ESP)	12.54	0.154	DQ

- The original winner, Josephine Onyia, was retrospectively disqualified following a failed doping test.

=== 400 metres hurdles ===
Men's
Rank	Athlete	Nation	Time (sec)	Reaction time	Notes
1	Kerron Clement	United States (USA)	48.96	0.175	
2	Danny McFarlane	Jamaica (JAM)	49.00	0.166	
3	Isa Phillips	Jamaica (JAM)	49.22	0.185	
4	Markino Buckley	Jamaica (JAM)	49.52	0.276	
5	L.J. van Zyl	South Africa (RSA)	49.95	0.158	
6	Marek Plawgo	Poland (POL)	51.13	0.161	
7	Reuben McCoy	United States (USA)	51.38	0.212	
8	LaRon Bennett	United States (USA)	52.02	0.172	

Women's
Rank	Athlete	Nation	Time (sec)	Reaction time	Notes
1	Melaine Walker	Jamaica (JAM)	54.06	0.279	
2	Anastasiya Rabchenyuk	Ukraine (UKR)	54.92	0.219	
3	Tiffany Williams	United States (USA)	55.16	0.151	
4	Yevgeniya Isakova	Russia (RUS)	55.23	0.186	
5	Sheena Tosta	United States (USA)	55.33	0.153	
6	Anna Jesień	Poland (POL)	55.44	0.151	
7	Christine Spence	United States (USA)	58.15	0.208	
8	Tasha Danvers	Great Britain (GBR)	58.40	0.174	

=== 3000 metres steeplechase ===
Men's
Rank	Athlete	Nation	Time (min)	Notes
1	Paul Kipsiele Koech	Kenya (KEN)	8:05.35	
2	Ezekiel Kemboi	Kenya (KEN)	8:15.32	
3	Richard Kipkemboi Mateelong	Kenya (KEN)	8:16.05	
4	Tareq Mubarak Taher	Bahrain (BHR)	8:16.27	
5	Benjamin Kiplagat	Uganda (UGA)	8:16.58	
6	Mustafa Mohamed	Sweden (SWE)	8:16.77	
7	Bouabdellah Tahri	France (FRA)	8:18.28	
8	Michael Kipkorir Kipyego	Kenya (KEN)	8:24.77	
9	Brimin Kiprop Kipruto	Kenya (KEN)	8:29.11	
10	Wesley Kiprotich	Kenya (KEN)	8:30.66	
11	Collins Kosgei	Kenya (KEN)	8:35.04	
—	Hamid Ezzine	Morocco (MAR)	DNS	

Women's
Rank	Athlete	Nation	Time (min)	Notes
1	Gulnara Galkina	Russia (RUS)	9:21.73	CR
2	Eunice Jepkorir Kertich	Kenya (KEN)	9:24.03	
3	Ruth Bisibori Nyangau	Kenya (KEN)	9:24.38	
4	Wioletta Frankiewicz	Poland (POL)	9:31.89	
5	Cristina Casandra	Romania (ROU)	9:35.27	
6	Donna MacFarlane	Australia (AUS)	9:36.72	
7	Ancuta Bobocel	Romania (ROU)	9:37.89	
8	Helen Clitheroe	Great Britain (GBR)	9:39.72	
9	Zemzem Ahmed	Ethiopia (ETH)	10:03.20	
—	Yekaterina Volkova	Russia (RUS)	DQ	
—	Victoria Mitchell	Australia (AUS)	DNS	

== Field ==
Events
High jump	Pole vault	Long jump	Triple jump	Shot put	Discus	Hammer	Javelin

=== High jump ===
Men's
Rank	Athlete	Nation	Result (m)	Notes
1	Andrey Silnov	Russia (RUS)	2.35	CR
2	Stefan Holm	Sweden (SWE)	2.33	
3	Jesse Williams	United States (USA)	2.29	
4	Yaroslav Rybakov	Russia (RUS)	2.29	
5	Linus Thörnblad	Sweden (SWE)	2.26	
6	Germaine Mason	Great Britain (GBR)	2.26	
7	Jamie Nieto	United States (USA)	2.22	
8	Kabelo Kgosiemang	Botswana (BOT)	2.18	

Women's
Rank	Athlete	Nation	Result (m)	Notes
1	Blanka Vlašić	Croatia (CRO)	2.01	CR
2	Tia Hellebaut	Belgium (BEL)	1.97	
3	Ariane Friedrich	Germany (GER)	1.97	
4	Chaunté Lowe	United States (USA)	1.97	
5	Marina Aitova	Kazakhstan (KAZ)	1.94	
6	Ruth Beitia	Spain (ESP)	1.94	
	Anna Chicherova	Russia (RUS)	1.99	DQ
	Elena Slesarenko	Russia (RUS)	1.94	DQ

=== Pole vault ===
Men's
Rank	Athlete	Nation	Result (m)	Notes
1	Derek Miles	United States (USA)	5.80	SB
2	Brad Walker	United States (USA)	5.70	
3	Maksym Mazuryk	Ukraine (UKR)	5.60	
4	Evgeniy Lukyanenko	Russia (RUS)	5.60	
4	Alexander Straub	Germany (GER)	5.60	
6	Fabian Schulze	Germany (GER)	5.40	
—	Sergey Kucheryanu	Russia (RUS)	NM	
—	Denys Yurchenko	Ukraine (UKR)	DQ	

Women's
Rank	Athlete	Nation	Result (m)	Notes
1	Silke Spiegelburg	Germany (GER)	4.70	PB
2	Svetlana Feofanova	Russia (RUS)	4.70	
3	Monika Pyrek	Poland (POL)	4.70	
4	Yuliya Golubchikova	Russia (RUS)	4.50	
5	Tatyana Polnova	Russia (RUS)	4.50	
6	Carolin Hingst	Germany (GER)	4.50	
6	Fabiana Murer	Brazil (BRA)	4.50	
—	Elena Isinbaeva	Russia (RUS)	DNS	

=== Long jump ===
Men's
Rank	Athlete	Nation	Result (m)	Wind	Notes
1	Fabrice Lapierre	Australia (AUS)	8.14	+0.6	SB
2	Hussein Taher Al-Sabee	Saudi Arabia (KSA)	8.13	+1.0	
3	Mohamed Salman Al Khuwalidi	Saudi Arabia (KSA)	8.04	+0.7	
4	Luis Felipe Méliz	Spain (ESP)	8.03	+0.6	
5	Sebastian Bayer	Germany (GER)	8.00	+1.1	
6	Miguel Pate	United States (USA)	7.99	+0.9	
7	Ndiss Kaba Badji	Senegal (SEN)	7.76	+0.8	
8	Nils Winter	Germany (GER)	7.54	+1.1	

Women's
Rank	Athlete	Nation	Result (m)	Wind	Notes
1	Naide Gomes	Portugal (POR)	6.71	+0.1	
2	Ksenija Balta	Estonia (EST)	6.65	+0.1	SB
3	Tatyana Lebedeva	Russia (RUS)	6.64	+0.1	
4	Grace Upshaw	United States (USA)	6.48	+0.4	
5	Oksana Udmurtova	Russia (RUS)	6.46	0.0	
6	Karin Mey Melis	Turkey (TUR)	6.37	+0.2	
7	Tatyana Kotova	Russia (RUS)	6.25	+0.1	
8	Funmi Jimoh	United States (USA)	6.00	-1.0	

=== Triple jump ===
Men's
Rank	Athlete	Nation	Result (m)	Wind	Notes
1	Nelson Évora	Portugal (POR)	17.24	+0.3	
2	Jadel Gregório	Brazil (BRA)	17.09	+0.1	
3	Randy Lewis	Grenada (GRN)	17.01	-0.4	
4	Walter Davis	United States (USA)	16.94	-0.2	
5	Dmitrij Valukevic	Slovakia (SVK)	16.94	+0.1	
6	Leevan Sands	Bahamas (BAH)	16.78	0.0	
7	Charles Michael Friedek	Germany (GER)	16.10	+0.2	
8	Ndiss Kaba Badji	Senegal (SEN)	15.66	-0.5	

Women's
Rank	Athlete	Nation	Result (m)	Wind	Notes
1	Anna Pyatykh	Russia (RUS)	14.78	+0.6	
2	Tatyana Lebedeva	Russia (RUS)	14.63	+0.6	
3	Marija Šestak	Slovenia (SLO)	14.63	+0.4	
4	Françoise Mbango Etone	Cameroon (CMR)	14.50	+1.3	
5	Oksana Udmurtova	Russia (RUS)	14.46	+0.3	
6	Olga Saladukha	Ukraine (UKR)	14.40	+0.8	
7	Dana Veldáková	Slovakia (SVK)	13.89	-0.1	
8	Gisele de Oliveira	Brazil (BRA)	13.55	+1.4	

=== Shot put ===
Men's
Rank	Athlete	Nation	Result (m)	Notes
1	Tomasz Majewski	Poland (POL)	20.88	
2	Christian Cantwell	United States (USA)	20.73	
3	Dan Taylor	United States (USA)	20.38	
4	Reese Hoffa	United States (USA)	20.37	
5	Dorian Scott	Jamaica (JAM)	20.04	
6	Peter Sack	Germany (GER)	19.91	
7	Dylan Armstrong	Canada (CAN)	19.30	
8	Garrett Johnson	United States (USA)	19.24	

Women's
Rank	Athlete	Nation	Result (m)	Notes
1	Valerie Adams	New Zealand (NZL)	19.69	
2	Nadine Kleinert	Germany (GER)	19.42	
3	Misleydis González	Cuba (CUB)	18.55	
4	Cleopatra Borel	Trinidad and Tobago (TTO)	18.50	
5	Christina Schwanitz	Germany (GER)	18.19	
6	Elizabeth Wanless	United States (USA)	17.72	
7	Kristin Heaston	United States (USA)	16.87	
8	Anca Heltne	Romania (ROU)	16.60	

=== Discus throw ===
Men's
Rank	Athlete	Nation	Result (m)	Notes
1	Gerd Kanter	Estonia (EST)	68.38	
2	Piotr Małachowski	Poland (POL)	66.07	
3	Robert Harting	Germany (GER)	65.76	
4	Zoltán Kövágó	Hungary (HUN)	65.11	
5	Gábor Máté	Hungary (HUN)	63.28	
6	Ehsan Hadadi	Iran (IRI)	62.76	
7	Mario Pestano	Spain (ESP)	61.67	
8	Virgilijus Alekna	Lithuania (LTU)	61.03	

Women's
Rank	Athlete	Nation	Result (m)	Notes
1	Nicoleta Grasu	Romania (ROU)	62.48	
2	Stephanie Brown Trafton	United States (USA)	62.23	
3	Vera Pospíšilová-Cechlová	Czech Republic (CZE)	58.72	
4	Anna Söderberg	Sweden (SWE)	57.40	
5	Aretha Thurmond	United States (USA)	56.99	
6	Becky Breisch	United States (USA)	53.92	
—	Yarelys Barrios	Cuba (CUB)	64.88	DQ
—	Beatrice Faumuina	New Zealand (NZL)	DNS	

- The original winner, Yarelys Barrios, was retrospectively disqualified due to a failed doping test at the 2008 Summer Olympics.

=== Hammer throw ===
Men's
Rank	Athlete	Nation	Result (m)	Notes
1	Primož Kozmus	Slovenia (SLO)	79.99	
2	Krisztián Pars	Hungary (HUN)	79.37	
3	Koji Murofushi	Japan (JPN)	78.99	
4	Szymon Ziólkowski	Poland (POL)	75.33	
5	Ali Mohamed Al-Zankawi	Kuwait (KUW)	74.19	
6	Marco Lingua	Italy (ITA)	73.59	
7	Artem Rubanko	Ukraine (UKR)	65.63	
8	Miloslav Konopka	Slovakia (SVK)	49.76	

Women's
Rank	Athlete	Nation	Result (m)	Notes
1	Yipsi Moreno	Cuba (CUB)	74.09	
2	Martina Hrasnová	Slovakia (SVK)	71.40	
3	Anita Wlodarczyk	Poland (POL)	70.97	
4	Ivana Brkljacic	Croatia (CRO)	70.00	
5	Betty Heidler	Germany (GER)	69.72	
6	Manuela Montebrun	France (FRA)	69.52	
7	Stéphanie Falzon	France (FRA)	68.85	
8	Clarissa Claretti	Italy (ITA)	68.67	

=== Javelin throw ===
Men's
Rank	Athlete	Nation	Result (m)	Notes
1	Vadims Vasilevskis	Latvia (LAT)	86.65	SB
2	Andreas Thorkildsen	Norway (NOR)	83.77	
3	Tero Pitkämäki	Finland (FIN)	81.64	
4	Eriks Rags	Latvia (LAT)	80.78	
5	Tero Järvenpää	Finland (FIN)	79.96	
6	Ainars Kovals	Latvia (LAT)	79.57	
7	Alexander Vieweg	Germany (GER)	74.65	
8	Tom Goyvaerts	Belgium (BEL)	73.47	

Women's
Rank	Athlete	Nation	Result (m)	Notes
1	Barbora Špotáková	Czech Republic (CZE)	72.28	WR
2	Christina Obergföll	Germany (GER)	63.28	
3	Steffi Nerius	Germany (GER)	62.78	
4	Zahra Bani	Italy (ITA)	60.22	
5	Linda Stahl	Germany (GER)	58.90	
6	Goldie Sayers	Great Britain (GBR)	58.04	
7	Barbara Madejczyk	Poland (POL)	56.71	
8	Mercedes Chilla	Spain (ESP)	54.29	
