= 2006 European Athletics Championships – Women's 400 metres hurdles =

Women's 400 metres hurdles at the European Athletics Championships
- Venue: Ullevi
- Location: Gothenburg, Sweden
- Dates: 7 August 2006 (round 1); 8 August 2006 (semi-finals); 9 August 2006 (final)
- Winning time: 53.93 s

Medalists
gold medal	Yevgeniya Isakova	Russia
silver medal	Fani Chalkia	Greece
bronze medal	Tetyana Tereshchuk-Antipova	Ukraine

The women's 400 metres hurdles at the 2006 European Athletics Championships were held at the Ullevi in Gothenburg, Sweden, on 7, 8, and 9 August 2006.

Iakovákis and Plawgo were well ahead of the field, while Williams surged towards the finish line and pipped Frenchman Naman Keïta by a hundredth.

== Medalists ==
Gold	Silver	Bronze
Yevgeniya Isakova; Russia	Fani Chalkia; Greece	Tetyana Tereshchuk-Antipova; Ukraine

== Schedule ==
Date	Time	Round
August 7, 2006	11:40	Round 1
August 8, 2006	19:15	Semifinals
August 9, 2006	20:10	Final

== Results ==
KEY:	q	Fastest non-qualifiers	Q	Qualified	NR	National record	PB	Personal best	SB	Seasonal best

=== Round 1 ===
Qualification: First 3 in each heat (Q) and the next 4 fastest (q) advance to the semifinals.

Rank	Heat	Name	Nationality	Time	Notes
1	3	Yevgeniya Isakova	Russia	55.21	Q
2	2	Fani Chalkia	Greece	55.42	Q
3	4	Anna Jesień	Poland	55.46	Q
4	1	Tetyana Tereshchuk-Antipova	Ukraine	55.47	Q
5	2	Natalia Ivanova	Russia	55.55	Q
6	3	Tasha Danvers-Smith	United Kingdom	55.64	Q
7	3	Angela Moroșanu	Romania	55.74	Q
8	4	Anastasiya Rabchenyuk	Ukraine	55.76	Q
9	2	Andri Sialou	Cyprus	55.87	Q, SB
10	2	Lee McConnell	United Kingdom	56.02	q
11	4	Claudia Marx	Germany	56.04	Q
12	1	Anastasiya Trifonova	Russia	56.10	Q
13	1	Zuzana Hejnová	Czech Republic	56.29	Q
14	4	Alena Rücklová	Czech Republic	56.44	q
15	2	Erica Mårtensson	Sweden	56.75	q, PB
16	1	Hristina Hantzi-Neag	Greece	56.80	q, SB
17	3	Marta Chrust-Rożej	Poland	56.90	
18	1	Cora Olivero	Spain	57.08	
19	4	Benedetta Ceccarelli	Italy	57.12	
20	1	Sara Orešnik	Slovenia	57.50	
21	3	Michelle Carey	Ireland	57.61	
22	2	Agnieszka Karpiesiuk	Poland	57.65	
23	4	Laia Forcadell	Spain	57.81	
24	3	Nadja Petersen	Sweden	57.90	
25	1	Dora Jémma	France	57.94	
26	2	Nikolina Horvat	Croatia	57.95	
27	4	Anneli Melin	Sweden	58.00	
28	4	Emma Duck	United Kingdom	58.03	
29	2	Martina Näf	Switzerland	58.08	
30	1	Özge Gürler	Turkey	58.39	
31	3	Zuzana Bergrová	Czech Republic	58.64	
	3	Ilona Ranta	Finland		DNF

=== Semifinals ===
First 4 of each Semifinal will be directly qualified (Q) for the Final.

==== Semifinal 1 ====
Rank	Lane	Name	Nationality	React	Time	Notes
1	5	Fani Chalkia	Greece	0.316	54.57	Q
2	7	Claudia Marx	Germany	0.171	54.80	Q, PB
3	3	Anna Jesień	Poland	0.200	54.87	Q
4	6	Anastasiya Rabchenyuk	Ukraine	0.181	55.25	Q
5	1	Lee McConnell	United Kingdom	0.235	55.61	
6	2	Andri Sialou	Cyprus	0.297	55.75	SB
7	4	Anastasiya Trifonova	Russia	0.227	56.02	
8	8	Alena Rücklová	Czech Republic	0.185	56.24	SB

==== Semifinal 2 ====
Rank	Lane	Name	Nationality	React	Time	Notes
1	6	Yevgeniya Isakova	Russia	0.149	54.17	Q, PB
2	4	Tetyana Tereshchuk-Antipova	Ukraine	0.252	54.39	Q, SB
3	5	Tasha Danvers-Smith	United Kingdom	0.172	55.14	Q
4	3	Natalia Ivanova	Russia	0.209	55.34	Q
5	7	Zuzana Hejnová	Czech Republic	0.140	56.39	
6	8	Erica Mårtensson	Sweden	0.145	56.91	
7	1	Hristina Hantzi-Neag	Greece	0.257	57.31	
8	2	Angela Moroșanu	Romania	0.254	57.78	

=== Final ===
Rank	Lane	Name	Nationality	React	Time	Notes
1st place, gold medalist(s)	6	Yevgeniya Isakova	Russia	0.174	53.93	PB
2nd place, silver medalist(s)	4	Fani Chalkia	Greece	0.181	54.02	
3rd place, bronze medalist(s)	3	Tetyana Tereshchuk-Antipova	Ukraine	0.196	54.55	
4	5	Claudia Marx	Germany	0.216	54.99	
5	2	Natalia Ivanova	Russia	0.282	55.04	PB
6	7	Anna Jesień	Poland	0.191	55.16	
7	1	Tasha Danvers-Smith	United Kingdom	0.165	55.56	
8	8	Anastasiya Rabchenyuk	Ukraine	0.183	55.74	
