= 1999 European Athletics U23 Championships – Women's high jump =

The women's high jump event at the 1999 European Athletics U23 Championships was held in Gothenburg, Sweden, at Ullevi on 30 July and 1 August 1999.

== Medalists ==
Gold	Svetlana Lapina; Russia
Silver	Amewu Mensah; Germany
Bronze	Linda Horvath; Austria

== Results ==
=== Final ===
1 August

Rank	Name	Nationality	Attempts									Result	Notes
Rank	Name	Nationality	1.73	1.78	1.82	1.85	1.88	1.91	1.93	1.95	1.98	Result	Notes
1st place, gold medalist(s)	Svetlana Lapina	Russia	–	–	o	o	o	o	o	o	o	1.98	CR
2nd place, silver medalist(s)	Amewu Mensah	Germany	–	o	o	o	o	o	o	xxx		1.93	
3rd place, bronze medalist(s)	Linda Horvath	Austria	o	o	o	xo	o	o	xxo	xxx		1.93	
4	Nevena Lenđel	Croatia	o	o	o	xo	xo	o	xxx			1.91	
5	Dóra Győrffy	Hungary	–	o	o	o	o	xxx				1.88	
6	Vita Palamar	Ukraine	–	o	o	o	xxx					1.85	
6	Stefania Cadamuro	Italy	o	o	o	o	xxx					1.85	
6	Agnieszka Giedrojć	Poland	–	o	o	o	xxx					1.85	
9	Susan Jones	Great Britain	–	o	o	xo	xxx					1.85	
10	Daniela Galeotti	Italy	o	o	o	xx–	x					1.82	
11	Ruth Beitia	Spain	o	o	xo	xxx						1.82	
12	Lee McConnell	Great Britain	o	o	xxo	xxx						1.82	
13	Romana Bělocká	Czech Republic	o	o	xxx							1.78	

=== Qualifications ===
30 July
First 12 to the Final

Rank	Name	Nationality	Result	Notes
1	Dóra Győrffy	Hungary	1.86	Q
1	Svetlana Lapina	Russia	1.86	Q
1	Vita Palamar	Ukraine	1.86	Q
1	Daniela Galeotti	Italy	1.86	Q
5	Linda Horvath	Austria	1.86	Q
6	Nevena Lenđel	Croatia	1.86	Q
6	Lee McConnell	Great Britain	1.86	Q
8	Amewu Mensah	Germany	1.86	Q
9	Agnieszka Giedrojć	Poland	1.86	Q
10	Stefania Cadamuro	Italy	1.86	Q
11	Susan Jones	Great Britain	1.83	Q
12	Ruth Beitia	Spain	1.83	Q
12	Romana Bělocká	Czech Republic	1.83	Q
14	Orsolya Apelt	Hungary	1.76	
15	Daniela Rath	Germany	1.76	
15	Elena Herzberg	Germany	1.76	

== Participation ==
According to an unofficial count, 16 athletes from 11 countries participated in the event.

- Austria (1)
- Croatia (1)
- Czech Republic (1)
- Germany (3)
- Great Britain (2)
- Hungary (2)
- Italy (2)
- Poland (1)
- Russia (1)
- Spain (1)
- Ukraine (1)
