= 1997 European Athletics U23 Championships – Women's high jump =

The women's high jump event at the 1997 European Athletics U23 Championships was held in Turku, Finland, on 10 and 12 July 1997.

== Medalists ==
Gold	Yuliya Lyakhova; Russia
Silver	Kajsa Bergqvist; Sweden
Bronze	Daniela Rath; Germany

== Results ==
=== Final ===
12 July

Rank	Name	Nationality	Attempts									Result	Notes
Rank	Name	Nationality	1.75	1.80	1.85	1.88	1.91	1.93	1.95	1.97	2.00	Result	Notes
1st place, gold medalist(s)	Yuliya Lyakhova	Russia	–	o	o	o	o	o	o	xo	xxx	1.97	
2nd place, silver medalist(s)	Kajsa Bergqvist	Sweden	o	o	o	o	xxo	o	xxx			1.93	
3rd place, bronze medalist(s)	Daniela Rath	Germany	o	o	xo	o	xo	xxx				1.91	
4	Amewu Mensah	Germany	o	o	o	o	xxo	xxx				1.91	
5	Emelie Färdigh	Sweden	o	o	xo	o	xxx					1.88	
6	Viktoriya Styopina	Ukraine	o	o	o	xxx						1.85	
6	Olga Kychanova	Russia	o	o	o	xxx						1.85	
8	Marta Mendía	Spain	o	xo	xxx							1.80	
8	Lina Pöldots	Estonia	o	xo	xxx							1.80	
10	Agnieszka Giedroyć	Poland	o	xxo	xxx							1.80	
10	Marijana Buljovčić	Yugoslavia	o	xxo	xxx							1.80	
12	Agni Charalambous	Cyprus	o	xxx								1.75	

=== Qualifications ===
10 July
Qualify: first to 12 to the Final

==== Group A ====
Rank	Name	Nationality	Result	Notes
1	Yuliya Lyakhova	Russia	1.80	Q
1	Amewu Mensah	Germany	1.80	Q
1	Emelie Färdigh	Sweden	1.80	Q
1	Viktoriya Styopina	Ukraine	1.80	Q
5	Lina Pöldots	Estonia	1.80	Q
6	Marijana Buljovčić	Yugoslavia	1.75	Q
7	Katja Vainikainen	Finland	1.70	
	Lenka Řiháková	Slovakia	NM	

==== Group B ====
Rank	Name	Nationality	Result	Notes
1	Kajsa Bergqvist	Sweden	1.80	Q
1	Daniela Rath	Germany	1.80	Q
3	Olga Kychanova	Russia	1.80	Q
4	Agni Charalambous	Cyprus	1.80	Q
5	Agnieszka Giedroyć	Poland	1.75	Q
5	Marta Mendía	Spain	1.75	Q
7	Eftichia Makri	Greece	1.75	

== Participation ==
According to an unofficial count, 15 athletes from 12 countries participated in the event.

- Cyprus (1)
- Estonia (1)
- Finland (1)
- Germany (2)
- Greece (1)
- Poland (1)
- Russia (2)
- Slovakia (1)
- Spain (1)
- Sweden (2)
- Ukraine (1)
- Yugoslavia (1)
