= 1996 World Junior Championships in Athletics – Women's high jump =

The women's high jump event at the 1996 World Junior Championships in Athletics was held in Sydney, Australia, at International Athletic Centre on 23 and 25 August.

== Medalists ==
Gold	Yuliya Lyakhova; Russia
Silver	Dóra Győrffy; Hungary
Bronze	Svetlana Lapina; Russia

== Results ==
=== Final ===
25 August

Rank	Name	Nationality	Result	Notes
1st place, gold medalist(s)	Yuliya Lyakhova	Russia	1.93	
2nd place, silver medalist(s)	Dóra Győrffy	Hungary	1.91	
3rd place, bronze medalist(s)	Svetlana Lapina	Russia	1.91	
4	Erin Aldrich	United States	1.88	
5	Emelie Färdigh	Sweden	1.88	
6	Hestrie Storbeck	South Africa	1.85	
6	Vita Palamar	Ukraine	1.85	
8	Katja Vainikainen	Finland	1.80	
8	Michelle Dunkley	United Kingdom	1.80	
10	Petra Lašková	Czech Republic	1.80	
11	Lisa Bruty	Australia	1.75	
11	Linda Horvath	Austria	1.75	

=== Qualifications ===
23 Aug

==== Group A ====
Rank	Name	Nationality	Result	Notes
1	Michelle Dunkley	United Kingdom	1.85	Q
1	Svetlana Lapina	Russia	1.85	Q
3	Dóra Győrffy	Hungary	1.85	Q
4	Lisa Bruty	Australia	1.85	Q
5	Linda Horvath	Austria	1.82	q
6	Vita Palamar	Ukraine	1.79	q
7	Barbara Berden	Slovenia	1.79	
8	Nevena Lenđel	Croatia	1.75	
9	Vicky Welthagen	South Africa	1.75	
10	Rachael Forrest	United Kingdom	1.70	
10	Yelena Temchina	Georgia	1.70	

==== Group B ====
Rank	Name	Nationality	Result	Notes
1	Yuliya Lyakhova	Russia	1.82	q
1	Emelie Färdigh	Sweden	1.82	q
3	Hestrie Storbeck	South Africa	1.82	q
3	Erin Aldrich	United States	1.82	q
5	Petra Lašková	Czech Republic	1.82	q
5	Katja Vainikainen	Finland	1.82	q
7	Stefania Cadamuro	Italy	1.79	
8	Amewu Mensah	Germany	1.79	
8	Gülsün Durak	Turkey	1.79	
10	Ruth Beitía	Spain	1.79	
11	Nelly Sebastien	France	1.75	
	Daniela Rath	Germany	NH	
	Madelein Joubert	Namibia	NH	

== Participation ==
According to an unofficial count, 24 athletes from 20 countries participated in the event.

- Australia (1)
- Austria (1)
- Croatia (1)
- Czech Republic (1)
- Finland (1)
- France (1)
- Georgia (1)
- Germany (2)
- Hungary (1)
- Italy (1)
- Namibia (1)
- Russia (2)
- Slovenia (1)
- South Africa (2)
- Spain (1)
- Sweden (1)
- Turkey (1)
- Ukraine (1)
- United Kingdom (2)
- United States (1)
