= Athletics at the 2003 Summer Universiade – Women's 400 metres hurdles =

The women's 400 metres hurdles event at the 2003 Summer Universiade was held in Daegu, South Korea with the final on 27–30 August.

== Medalists ==
Gold	Silver	Bronze
Maren Schott; Germany	Huang Xiaoxiao; China	Anastasiya Rabchenyuk; Ukraine

== Results ==
=== Heats ===
Rank	Heat	Athlete	Nationality	Time	Notes
1	1	Huang Xiaoxiao	China	57.31	Q
2	2	Maren Schott	Germany	57.52	Q
3	3	Anja Neupert	Germany	57.62	Q
4	3	Maria Rus	Romania	57.75	Q
5	1	Noraseela Mohd Khalid	Malaysia	57.76	Q
6	2	Anastasiya Rabchenyuk	Ukraine	57.87	Q
7	2	Ewelina Sętowska	Poland	57.91	q
8	3	Marta Chrust	Poland	57.92	q
9	1	Benedetta Ceccarelli	Italy	58.05	
10	1	Meta Mačus	Slovenia	58.06	
11	3	Alena Rücklová	Czech Republic	58.18	
12	3	Margit Katrine Strand	Norway	58.63	
13	2	Manuela Bosco	Finland	58.72	
14	2	Zahra Lachguer	Morocco	59.01	
15	1	Sonja Bowe	New Zealand	59.14	
16	1	Luciana França	Brazil	59.79	
17	1	Wassana Winatho	Thailand	1:00.38	
18	3	Sian Scott	Great Britain	1:00.88	
19	2	Michelle Carey	Ireland	1:01.11	

=== Final ===
Rank	Lane	Athlete	Nationality	Time	Notes
1st place, gold medalist(s)	3	Maren Schott	Germany	55.28	
2nd place, silver medalist(s)	4	Huang Xiaoxiao	China	56.10	
3rd place, bronze medalist(s)	7	Anastasiya Rabchenyuk	Ukraine	56.30	
4	6	Maria Rus	Romania	56.34	
5	2	Marta Chrust	Poland	56.89	
6	1	Noraseela Mohd Khalid	Malaysia	56.90	
7	8	Ewelina Sętowska	Poland	57.92	
	5	Anja Neupert	Germany	DNF	
