= 2003 European Athletics U23 Championships – Women's 400 metres hurdles =

The women's 400 metres hurdles event at the 2003 European Athletics U23 Championships was held in Bydgoszcz, Poland, at Zawisza Stadion on 18 and 19 July.

== Medalists ==
| Gold | Oksana Gulumyan; Russia |
| Silver | Irena Žauna; Latvia |
| Bronze | Maria Rus; Romania |

== Results ==
=== Final ===
19 July

| Rank | Name | Nationality | Time | Notes |
|---|---|---|---|---|
| 1st place, gold medalist(s) | Oksana Gulumyan | Russia | 56.23 | |
| 2nd place, silver medalist(s) | Irena Žauna | Latvia | 56.47 | |
| 3rd place, bronze medalist(s) | Maria Rus | Romania | 57.01 | |
| 4 | Mariya Menshchikova | Russia | 57.37 | |
| 5 | Alena Rücklová | Czech Republic | 57.61 | |
| 6 | Anastasiya Rabchenyuk | Ukraine | 58.06 | |
| 7 | Karolina Tłustochowska | Poland | 58.15 | |
| 8 | Zhanna Bordyugova | Ukraine | 58.47 | |

=== Heats ===
18 July
Qualified: first 2 in each heat and 2 best to the Final

==== Heat 1 ====
| Rank | Name | Nationality | Time | Notes |
|---|---|---|---|---|
| 1 | Maria Rus | Romania | 57.50 | Q |
| 2 | Anastasiya Rabchenyuk | Ukraine | 57.83 | Q |
| 3 | Karolina Tłustochowska | Poland | 57.84 | q |
| 4 | Michelle Carey | Ireland | 59.34 | |
| 5 | Nele Van Doninck | Belgium | 59.81 | |
| 6 | Virginie Hombel | France | 61.02 | |

==== Heat 2 ====
| Rank | Name | Nationality | Time | Notes |
|---|---|---|---|---|
| 1 | Mariya Menshchikova | Russia | 58.18 | Q |
| 2 | Zhanna Bordyugova | Ukraine | 58.58 | Q |
| 3 | Patrícia Lopes | Portugal | 58.95 | |
| 4 | Hannah Wood | United Kingdom | 59.93 | |
| 5 | Sylvaine Derycke | France | 60.26 | |
| 6 | Laia Forcadell | Spain | 88.69 | |

==== Heat 3 ====
| Rank | Name | Nationality | Time | Notes |
|---|---|---|---|---|
| 1 | Oksana Gulumyan | Russia | 55.98 | Q |
| 2 | Irena Žauna | Latvia | 56.72 | Q |
| 3 | Alena Rücklová | Czech Republic | 57.13 | q |
| 4 | Manuela Bosco | Finland | 58.18 | |
| 5 | Tina Kron | Germany | 58.40 | |
| 6 | Iana Aculova | Moldova | 59.67 | |
| 7 | Silja Úlfarsdóttir | Iceland | 61.30 | |

== Participation ==
According to an unofficial count, 19 athletes from 16 countries participated in the event.

- Belgium (1)
- Czech Republic (1)
- Finland (1)
- France (2)
- Germany (1)
- Iceland (1)
- Ireland (1)
- Latvia (1)
- Moldova (1)
- Poland (1)
- Portugal (1)
- Romania (1)
- Russia (2)
- Spain (1)
- Ukraine (2)
- United Kingdom (1)
