= Athletics at the 2005 Summer Universiade – Women's 400 metres hurdles =

The women's 400 metres hurdles event at the 2005 Summer Universiade was held on 17–20 August in İzmir, Turkey.

== Medalists ==
Gold	Silver	Bronze
Marina Shiyan; Russia	Benedetta Ceccarelli; Italy	Marta Chrust-Rożej; Poland

== Results ==
=== Heats ===
Rank	Heat	Athlete	Nationality	Time	Notes
1	2	Marina Shiyan	Russia	56.11	Q
2	2	Benedetta Ceccarelli	Italy	56.83	Q
3	1	Nicola Sanders	Great Britain	56.98	Q
4	1	Alena Rücklová	Czech Republic	57.05	Q
5	3	Yekaterina Kostetskaya	Russia	57.08	Q
6	1	Anastasiya Rabchenyuk	Ukraine	57.17	Q
7	3	Cora Olivero	Spain	57.34	Q
8	3	Houria Moussa	Algeria	57.34	Q
9	2	Tina Kron	Germany	57.35	Q
10	4	Marta Chrust-Rożej	Poland	57.55	Q
11	1	Anja Neupert	Germany	57.86	q
12	3	Olga Tereshkova	Kazakhstan	57.88	q
13	2	Zhang Rongrong	China	57.97	q
14	4	Sian Scott	Great Britain	58.10	Q
15	3	Oksana Volosyuk	Ukraine	58.47	q
16	4	Amornrat Winatho	Thailand	58.66	Q
17	1	Patrícia Lopes	Portugal	58.73	
18	4	Inna Kalinina	Belarus	58.86	
19	2	Michelle Carey	Ireland	59.14	
20	1	Aurore Kassambara	France	59.39	
21	3	Rika Sakurai	Japan	59.62	
22	1	Özge Gürler	Turkey	59.63	
23	1	Lamiae Lhabze	Morocco	59.67	SB
24	2	Tatyana Azarova	Kazakhstan	1:00.52	
25	4	Han Juan	China	1:01.72	
26	2	Theodosia Nakopoulou	Greece	1:01.81	
	4	Vania Stambolova	Bulgaria	DNF	

=== Semifinals ===
Rank	Heat	Athlete	Nationality	Time	Notes
1	1	Marina Shiyan	Russia	55.87	Q
2	1	Benedetta Ceccarelli	Italy	55.99	Q
3	1	Marta Chrust-Rożej	Poland	55.99	Q
4	1	Sian Scott	Great Britain	56.42	Q, PB
5	2	Cora Olivero	Spain	56.47	Q
6	2	Alena Rücklová	Czech Republic	56.53	Q
7	2	Nicola Sanders	Great Britain	56.74	Q
8	2	Tina Kron	Germany	56.74	Q
9	1	Anastasiya Rabchenyuk	Ukraine	57.13	
10	2	Zhang Rongrong	China	57.28	
11	2	Yekaterina Kostetskaya	Russia	57.58	
12	1	Olga Tereshkova	Kazakhstan	57.85	PB
13	2	Oksana Volosyuk	Ukraine	57.86	
14	2	Houria Moussa	Algeria	59.71	
	1	Anja Neupert	Germany	DNF	
	1	Amornrat Winatho	Thailand	DNF	

=== Final ===
Rank	Athlete	Nationality	Time	Notes
1st place, gold medalist(s)	Marina Shiyan	Russia	55.14	PB
2nd place, silver medalist(s)	Benedetta Ceccarelli	Italy	55.22	
3rd place, bronze medalist(s)	Marta Chrust-Rożej	Poland	55.49	PB
4	Alena Rücklová	Czech Republic	55.87	PB
5	Cora Olivero	Spain	55.97	
6	Nicola Sanders	Great Britain	55.99	
7	Tina Kron	Germany	56.10	SB
8	Sian Scott	Great Britain	56.92	
