= Yevgeniya Isakova =

Russian hurdler (born 1978)

Yevgeniya Leonidova Isakova (Russian: Евге́ния Леони́довна Иса́кова; born 27 November 1978) is a Russian former hurdler who specialised in the 400 metres hurdles.

She won the gold medal in the 400 m hurdles final at the 2006 European Athletics Championships in Gothenburg.

== International competitions ==
Representing Russia
Year	Competition	Venue	Position	Event	Notes
2005	World Championships	Helsinki, Finland	—	400 m hurdles	DNS
2006	European Cup	Málaga, Spain	2nd	400 m hurdles	55.82
2006	European Championships	Gothenburg, Sweden	1st	400 m hurdles	53.93
2007	World Championships	Osaka, Japan	6th	400 m hurdles	54.50
2007	World Athletics Final	Stuttgart, Germany	4th	400 m hurdles	54.99
2008	World Athletics Final	Stuttgart, Germany	4th	400 m hurdles	55.23
2010	European Championships	Barcelona, Spain	6th	400 m hurdles	54.59

== National titles ==
- Russian Athletics Championships
  - 400 m hurdles: 2006

== See also ==
- List of people from Saint Petersburg
- List of European Athletics Championships medalists (women)
