= Forcadell =

Forcadell is a surname. Notable people with the surname include:

- Carme Forcadell (born 1956), Catalan linguist and politician
- Laia Forcadell (born 1982), Catalan sprinter and hurdler
