= Athletics at the 2006 Commonwealth Games – Women's 400 metres hurdles =

Women's 400 metres hurdles at the Commonwealth Games

The women's 400 metres hurdles event at the 2006 Commonwealth Games was held on March 22–23.

== Medalists ==
Gold	Silver	Bronze
Jana Pittman; Australia	Natasha Danvers; England	Lee McConnell; Scotland

== Results ==
=== Heats ===
Qualification: First 3 of each heat (Q) and the next 2 fastest (q) qualified for the final.

Rank	Heat	Name	Nationality	Time	Notes
1	2	Jana Pittman	Australia	55.06	Q
2	1	Natasha Danvers	England	55.47	Q, SB
3	2	Lee McConnell	Scotland	55.68	Q, PB
4	2	Nicola Sanders	England	55.76	Q
5	1	Shevon Stoddart	Jamaica	57.14	Q
6	1	Norasheela Mohd Khalid	Malaysia	57.15	Q
7	2	Androula Sialou	Cyprus	57.30	q
8	1	Sonia Britto	Australia	57.37	q
9	2	Lauren Boden	Australia	57.77	
10	1	Carole Kaboud Mebam	Cameroon	58.04	
11	2	Sian Scott	England	58.05	SB
12	1	Tawa Dortch	Canada	58.40	
13	2	Florence Wasike	Kenya	58.65	

=== Final ===
Rank	Lane	Name	Nationality	Time	Notes
1st place, gold medalist(s)	6	Jana Pittman	Australia	53.82	GR
2nd place, silver medalist(s)	3	Natasha Danvers	England	55.17	SB
3rd place, bronze medalist(s)	5	Lee McConnell	Scotland	55.25	PB
4	8	Nicola Sanders	England	55.32	PB
5	4	Shevon Stoddart	Jamaica	56.67	
6	1	Norasheela Mohd Khalid	Malaysia	56.89	
7	2	Sonia Britto	Australia	57.23	
	7	Androula Sialou	Cyprus	DQ	
