= Cora Olivero =

Spanish hurdler (born 1978)

Personal information
- Born: 28 August 1978 (age 48) Córdoba, Argentina

Sport
- Sport: Track and field
Medal record
Representing Spain
Mediterranean Games
Gold medal – first place	2005 Almeria	4x400m relay
Silver medal – second place	2005 Almeria	400m hurdles

Cora Daniela Olivero Bergese (born 28 August 1978) is a Spanish retired athlete who specialised in the 400 metres hurdles. She represented Spain at the 2004 Summer Olympics, although she did not qualify for the semifinals.

Olivero switched her allegiance from Argentina to Spain in 1998 and holds several Argentine records.

== Competition record ==
Year	Competition	Venue	Position	Event	Notes
Representing Argentina
1994	South American Youth Championships	Bucaramanga, Colombia	2nd	100 m hurdles	14.72
1994	South American Youth Championships	Bucaramanga, Colombia	3rd	4x400 m relay	4:07.93
1995	Pan American Junior Championships	Santiago, Chile	12th (h)	100 m hurdles	15.41
1995	South American Junior Championships	Santiago, Chile	3rd	100 m hurdles	15.44
1996	South American Junior Championships	Bucaramanga, Colombia	3rd	100 m hurdles	14.7
1996	South American Junior Championships	Bucaramanga, Colombia	5th	4x400 m relay	3:58.7
1997	South American Junior Championships	San Carlos, Uruguay	2nd	100 m hurdles	14.70
1997	South American Junior Championships	San Carlos, Uruguay	3rd	4x100 m relay	48.95
1999	South American Championships	Bogotá, Colombia	4th	100 m hurdles	13.54
1999	South American Championships	Bogotá, Colombia	5th	400 m hurdles	61.16
1999	Universiade	Palma de Mallorca, Spain	18th (h)	100 m hurdles	14.01
Representing Spain
2003	World Championships	Paris, France	14th (sf)	400 m hurdles	55.82
2004	World Indoor Championships	Budapest, Hungary	11th (h)	4x400 m relay	3:38.01
2004	Ibero-American Championships	Huelva, Spain	4th	400 m hurdles	56.47
2004	Ibero-American Championships	Huelva, Spain	2nd	4x400 m relay	3:32.00
2004	Olympic Games	Athens, Greece	22nd (h)	400 m hurdles	56.19
2005	European Indoor Championships	Madrid, Spain	12th (h)	400 m	54.35
2005	European Indoor Championships	Madrid, Spain	5th	4x400 m relay	3:39.73
2005	Mediterranean Games	Almería, Spain	2nd	400 m hurdles	55.85
2005	Mediterranean Games	Almería, Spain	1st	4x400 m relay	3:31.45
2005	World Championships	Helsinki, Finland	18th (sf)	400 m hurdles	56.47
2005	Universiade	İzmir, Turkey	5th	400 m hurdles	55.97
2006	European Championships	Gothenburg, Sweden	18th (h)	400 m hurdles	57.08

== Personal bests ==
Outdoor

- 200 metres – 23.88 (-0.4 m/s) (Madrid 2003)
- 400 metres – 53.20 (Getafe 2003)
- 100 metres hurdles – 13.36 (Valladolid 2002)
- 400 metres hurdles – 55.27 (Almería 2005)

Indoor

- 200 metres – 25.06 (Oviedo 2003)
- 400 metres – 53.68 (Madrid 2005)
- 60 metres hurdles – 8.53 (Valencia 2002)
