= Khristina Kalcheva =

Bulgarian high jumper

Khristina Kalcheva (Russian: Христина Калчева; born 29 May 1977) is a retired Bulgarian athlete specialising in the high jump. She is the World Indoor Champion from 1999. She competed at the 2000 Summer Olympics failing to get a valid jump.

She was born in Aleksin in Russia's Tula Oblast.

She has a personal best of 1.99 metres both outdoors and indoors.

== Competition record ==
Year	Competition	Venue	Position	Notes
Representing Bulgaria
1998	European Championships	Budapest, Hungary	16th (q)	1.87 m
1999	World Indoor Championships	Maebashi, Japan	1st	1.99 m
2000	Olympic Games	Sydney, Australia	–	NM
