= Jane Kiptoo =

Kenyan long-distance runner

Personal information
- Born: 8 August 1982 (age 43)

Sport
- Sport: Athletics

Achievements and titles
- Personal best: Marathon: 2:31:21 (2014)
Medal record
Representing Kenya
Women's athletics
IAAF World Cross Country Championships
Silver medal – second place	2002 Dublin	Team

Jane Jepkosgei Kiptoo (born 8 August 1982) is a Kenyan long-distance runner who mainly competes in road running events, up to the marathon distance. She was a team silver medallist in the short race at the 2002 IAAF World Cross Country Championships – her only international selection for Kenya. She also competed in track running in the 2008 season and was third in the 3000 metres at the 2008 IAAF World Athletics Final, and also eight in the 5000 metres in a lifetime best time of 15:03.80 minutes.

She began competing in European road races in 2000. Her achievements include wins at the Groet Uit Schoorl Run (2003), U.S. 10K Classic (2003), Stadsloop Appingedam (2003), Humarathon (2008) and Stramilano (2010). She has had top three finishes at the Zwitserloot Dak Run, Marseille-Cassis Classique Internationale, Olomouc Half Marathon, Puy-en-Velay 15K, Crim Festival of Races, Lisbon Half Marathon, and Cooper River Bridge Run. Kiptoo made her debut over the marathon distance in 2013 and won the Geneva Marathon in 2015 and 2016. In 2008 she won the Aranda de Duero Cross de la Constitucion and Cross Internacional de Soria cross country races in Spain.

== International competitions ==
Year	Competition	Venue	Position	Event	Notes
2002	World Cross Country Championships	Dublin, Ireland	17th	Short race	14:11
2002	World Cross Country Championships	Dublin, Ireland	2nd	Team	34 pts
2008	World Athletics Final	Stuttgart, Germany	3rd	3000 m	8:47.65
2008	World Athletics Final	Stuttgart, Germany	8th	5000 m	15:03.80
