= 2005 European Athletics Indoor Championships – Women's 4 × 400 metres relay =

The Women's 4 × 400 metres relay event at the 2005 European Athletics Indoor Championships was held on March 6.

== Results ==
Rank	Team	Athlete	Time	Notes
1st place, gold medalist(s)	Russia	Tatyana Levina; Yuliya Pechonkina; Irina Rosikhina; Svetlana Pospelova	3:28.90	
2nd place, silver medalist(s)	Poland	Anna Pacholak; Monika Bejnar; Marta Chrust-Rożej; Małgorzata Pskit	3:29.37	NR
3rd place, bronze medalist(s)	Great Britain	Melanie Purkiss; Donna Fraser; Catherine Murphy; Lee McConnell	3:29.81	NR
4	Ukraine	Antonina Yefremova; Oksana Ilyushkina; Liliya Pilyugina; Natalya Pygyda	3:31.67	
5	Spain	Cora Olivero; Laia Forcadell; Miriam Bravo; Belén Recio	3:39.73	
6	Greece	Anna Moisiadou; Eleftheria Papadopoulou; Maria Papadopoulou; Eleni Filandra	3:48.42	
