= Maria Rus =

Romanian sprinter (born 1983)

Personal information
- Born: 19 January 1983 (age 43) Sângeorz-Băi, Romania
- Height: 1.83 m (6 ft 0 in)
- Spouse: Lucian Sânmărtean (m. 2010)
- Children: 1

Sport
- Events: 400 metres 4 × 400 metres relay
- Club: CSM Bistrița; CS Farul Constanta

Maria Rus (born 19 January 1983) is a Romanian former sprinter who specialized in the 400 metres and later 400 metres hurdles. Her most significant achievements was a bronze medal in the 4 × 400 metres relay at the 2004 World Indoor Championships.

== Individual achievements ==
In age-specific competitions, Rus competed at the 1999 World Youth Championships without reaching the final before finishing fourth at the 2000 World Junior Championships and sixth at the 2001 European Junior Championships. She also won silver medals at the 2001 and 2003 Balkan Indoor Championships.

Changing her main event to the 400 metres hurdles in 2003, Rus won the bronze medal at the 2003 European U23 Championships, finished fourth at the 2003 Summer Universiade and won the gold medal at the 2004 Balkan Championships. Rus became Romanian indoor champion in 2003, and then became dual national champion in both the 400 flat and 400 hurdles in 2003 and 2004. Rus also competed in several European Cup Super League meets.

Her personal best times were 52.64 seconds in the 400 metres, achieved in June 2004 in Bucureşti; and 56.09 seconds in the 400 metres hurdles, achieved in July 2004 in Istanbul. From her bronze medal run at the 2004 World Indoor Championships, she still holds the Romanian indoor record in the 4 × 400 metres relay.

== Relay ==
In age-specific competitions, Rus was a part of Romanian teams that won bronze medals at both the 2000 World Junior Championships and the 2001 European Junior Championships. In 2004, she helped win a bronze medal at the 2004 World Indoor Championships, before competing at the 2004 Olympic Games and the 2005 World Championships without reaching the final.
