= Daniela Rath =

German high jumper

Daniela Mareen Rath (born 6 May 1977 in Willich) is a German high jumper.

== Biography ==
She finished fifth at the 2004 IAAF World Indoor Championships in Budapest. She also competed at the World Championships in 2001 and 2003, but failed to qualify for the finals.

Her personal best jump is 2.00 metres, achieved in June 2003 in Florence.

== Achievements ==
Year	Competition	Venue	Position	Event	Notes
Representing Germany
1996	World Junior Championships	Sydney, Australia	—	High jump	NH
1997	European U23 Championships	Turku, Finland	3rd	High jump	1.91 m
1999	European U23 Championships	Gothenburg, Sweden	15th (q)	High jump	1.76 m

== See also ==
- Female two metres club
