= Anna Guzowska =

Polish sprinter (born 1980)

Personal information
- Nationality: Polish
- Born: 15 January 1980 (age 46) Sieradz, Poland

Sport
- Sport: Athletics
- Event(s): 400 m, 400 m hurdles
Medal record
Women's athletics
Representing Poland
European Indoor Championships
Silver medal – second place	2002 Vienna	4 x 400 m
Silver medal – second place	2005 Madrid	4 x 400 m

Anna Guzowska (née Pacholak; born 15 January 1980) is a Polish sprinter who specialized in the 200 metres.

== Achievements ==
Year	Competition	Venue	Position	Event	Notes
Representing Poland
1997	European Junior Championships	Ljubljana, Slovenia	3rd	4 × 100 m relay	45.59
1998	World Junior Championships	Annecy, France	14th (sf)	200 m	24.21
1998	World Junior Championships	Annecy, France	5th	4 × 100 m relay	44.75
2002	European Indoor Championships	Vienna, Austria	14th (sf)	200 m	24.06
2002	European Indoor Championships	Vienna, Austria	2nd	4 × 400 m relay	3:32.45
2003	World Championships	Paris, France	25th (qf)	200 m	23.43
2003	World Championships	Paris, France	4th (h)	4 × 400 m relay	3:26.66
2004	Olympic Games	Athens, Greece	25th (qf)	200 m	23.35
2005	European Indoor Championships	Madrid, Spain	4th	200 m	23.55
2005	European Indoor Championships	Madrid, Spain	2nd	4 × 400 m relay	3:29.37
2005	World Championships	Helsinki, Finland	22nd (sf)	400 m	52.45
2005	World Championships	Helsinki, Finland	4th	4 × 400 m relay	3:24.49

=== Personal bests ===
- 100 metres - 11.71 s (2004)
- 200 metres - 22.87 s (2003)
- 400 metres - 51.29 s (2005)

== See also ==
- Polish records in athletics
