= Marta Chrust-Rożej =

Polish athlete (born 1978)

Personal information
- Nationality: Polish
- Born: 15 January 1980 (age 46) Namysłów, Poland

Sport
- Sport: Athletics
- Events: 400 m, 400 m hurdles
Medal record
Representing Poland
Women's athletics
European Championships
Bronze medal – third place	2006 Gothenburg	4 × 400 m
European Indoor Championships
Silver medal – second place	2005 Madrid	4 × 400 m

Marta Chrust-Rożej (born 29 September 1978 in Namysłów) is a Polish retired athlete who specialized in the 400 metres hurdles and 4 × 400 m relay.

== Competition record ==
Year	Competition	Venue	Position	Event	Notes
Representing Poland
2003	Universiade	Daegu, South Korea	5th	400 m hurdles	56.89
2003	Universiade	Daegu, South Korea	2nd	4 × 400 m relay	3:38.17
2005	European Indoor Championships	Madrid, Spain	2nd	4 × 400 m relay	3:29.37 (iNR)
2005	World Championships	Helsinki, Finland	20th (sf)	400 m hurdles	56.80
2005	Universiade	İzmir, Turkey	3rd	400 m hurdles	55.49 (PB)
2006	World Indoor Championships	Moscow, Russia	4th	4 × 400 m relay	3:28.95 (iNR)
2006	European Championships	Gothenburg, Sweden	17th (h)	400 m hurdles	56.90
2006	European Championships	Gothenburg, Sweden	3rd	4 × 400 m relay	3:27.77

=== Personal bests ===
- 200 metres - 24.17 s (2005)
- 400 metres - 53.77 s (2004)
- 100 metres hurdles - 13.59 s (2003)
- 400 metres hurdles - 55.49 s (2005)
