= Athletics at the 2001 Summer Universiade – Women's 4 × 400 metres relay =

The women's 4 × 400 metres relay event at the 2001 Summer Universiade was held at the Workers Stadium in Beijing, China on 1 September.

== Results ==
Rank	Nation	Athletes	Time	Notes
1st place, gold medalist(s)	United States	Me'Lisa Barber, Carolyn Jackson, Demetria Washington, Mikele Barber	3:28.04	
2nd place, silver medalist(s)	Great Britain	Tracey Duncan, Jennifer Meadows, Tasha Danvers, Lee McConnell	3:30.40	
3rd place, bronze medalist(s)	Belarus	Sviatlana Usovich, Natallia Safronnikava, Anna Kozak, Iryna Khliustava	3:30.65	
4	Russia	Tatyana Firova, Marina Grishakova, Natalya Khrushcheleva, Tatyana Levina	3:30.91	
5	Australia	Renee Robson, Sonia Brito, Rebecca Sadler, Annabelle Smith	3:32.20	
6	Netherlands	Jacqueline Poelman, Lotte Visschers, Judith Vis, Judith Baarssen	3:37.51	
7	China	Li Yulian, Chen Yuxiang, Bo Fanfang, Song Yinglan	3:39.89	
8	Nigeria	Victoria Moradeyo, Doris Jacob, Mary Onyemuwa, ?	3:48.92	
