= Vita Palamar =

Ukrainian high jumper (born 1977)

Olympic medal record

Women's athletics

Representing Ukraine

World Indoor Championships
Bronze medal – third place	2008 Valencia	High jump

Goodwill Games
Bronze medal – third place	2001 Brisbane	High jump

Military World Games
Gold medal – first place	2007 Hyderabad	High jump

World Athletics Final
Silver medal – second place	2003 Monte Carlo	High jump
Bronze medal – third place	2005 Monte Carlo	High jump

European Cup
Silver medal – second place	2005 Florence	High jump

Summer Universiade
Gold medal – first place	2001 Beijing	High jump

Vita Palamar (Ukrainian: Віта Паламар; born 12 October 1977 in Khmelnytskyi, Soviet Union) is a female high jumper from Ukraine.

== Career ==
Her personal best jump is 2.01 metres, achieved in Zürich in August 2003. She set an indoor best of 1.96 m to win the Hochsprung mit Musik in 2001.

On 17 November 2016, the IOC disqualified Palamar from the 2008 Olympic Games and struck her results from the record for failing a drugs test in a re-analysis of her doping sample from 2008.

In May 2017, she was disqualified for two years.

== Achievements ==
Year	Competition	Venue	Position	Notes
Representing Ukraine
1996	World Junior Championships	Sydney, Australia	6th	1.85 m
1999	European U23 Championships	Gothenburg, Sweden	6th	1.85 m
2000	European Indoor Championships	Ghent, Belgium	5th	1.92 m
2000	Olympic Games	Sydney, Australia	7th	1.96 m
2001	World Indoor Championships	Lisbon, Portugal	5th	1.93 m
2001	World Championships	Edmonton, Canada	5th	1.94 m
2001	Universiade	Beijing, China	1st	1.96 m
2001	Goodwill Games	Brisbane, Australia	3rd	1.93 m
2003	World Athletics Final	Monte Carlo, Monaco	2nd	2.01m (=PB)
2004	World Indoor Championships	Budapest, Hungary	4th	1.97 m
2004	World Athletics Final	Monte Carlo, Monaco	8th	1.88 m
2005	World Championships	Helsinki, Finland	5th	1.93 m
2005	World Athletics Final	Monte Carlo, Monaco	2nd	1.93 m
2008	World Indoor Championships	Valencia, Spain	3rd	2.01 m (NR)
2008	Olympic Games	Beijing, China	DSQ (5th)	DSQ (1.99)

== See also ==
- Female two metres club
