= Svetlana Lapina =

Russian high jumper

Personal information
- Born: 12 April 1978 (age 48) Makhachkala, Soviet Union

Sport
- Sport: Track and field
Medal record
Representing Russia
World Championships
Bronze medal – third place	1999 Seville	High jump
European U23 Championships
Gold medal – first place	1999 Gothenburg	High jump
Summer Universiade
Silver medal – second place	1999 Palma de Mallorca	High jump

Svetlana Mikhailovna Lapina (Russian: Светлана Михайловна Лапина); born 12 April 1978) is a Russian high jumper.

== Life ==
Her personal best jump was 1.99 metres, achieved at the 1999 World Championships in Seville, where she won a surprising bronze medal.

== Competition record ==
Year	Competition	Venue	Position	Notes
Representing Russia
1996	World Junior Championships	Sydney, Australia	3rd	1.91 m
1997	European Junior Championships	Ljubljana, Slovenia	3rd	1.90 m
1999	Universiade	Palma de Mallorca, Spain	2nd	1.93 m
1999	European U23 Championships	Gothenburg, Sweden	1st	1.98 m
1999	World Championships	Seville, Spain	3rd	1.99 m
2000	Olympic Games	Sydney, Australia	15th (q)	1.92 m
