= Agni Charalambous =

Cypriot athlete (born 1975)

Personal information
- Nationality: Cypriot
- Born: 2 September 1975 (age 51)

Sport
- Sport: Athletics
- Event: High jump

Agni Charalambous (Greek: Αγνή Χαραλάμπους; born 2 September 1975) is a Cypriot athlete. She competed in the women's high jump at the 2000 Summer Olympics.
