= Daniela Galeotti =

Italian high jumper

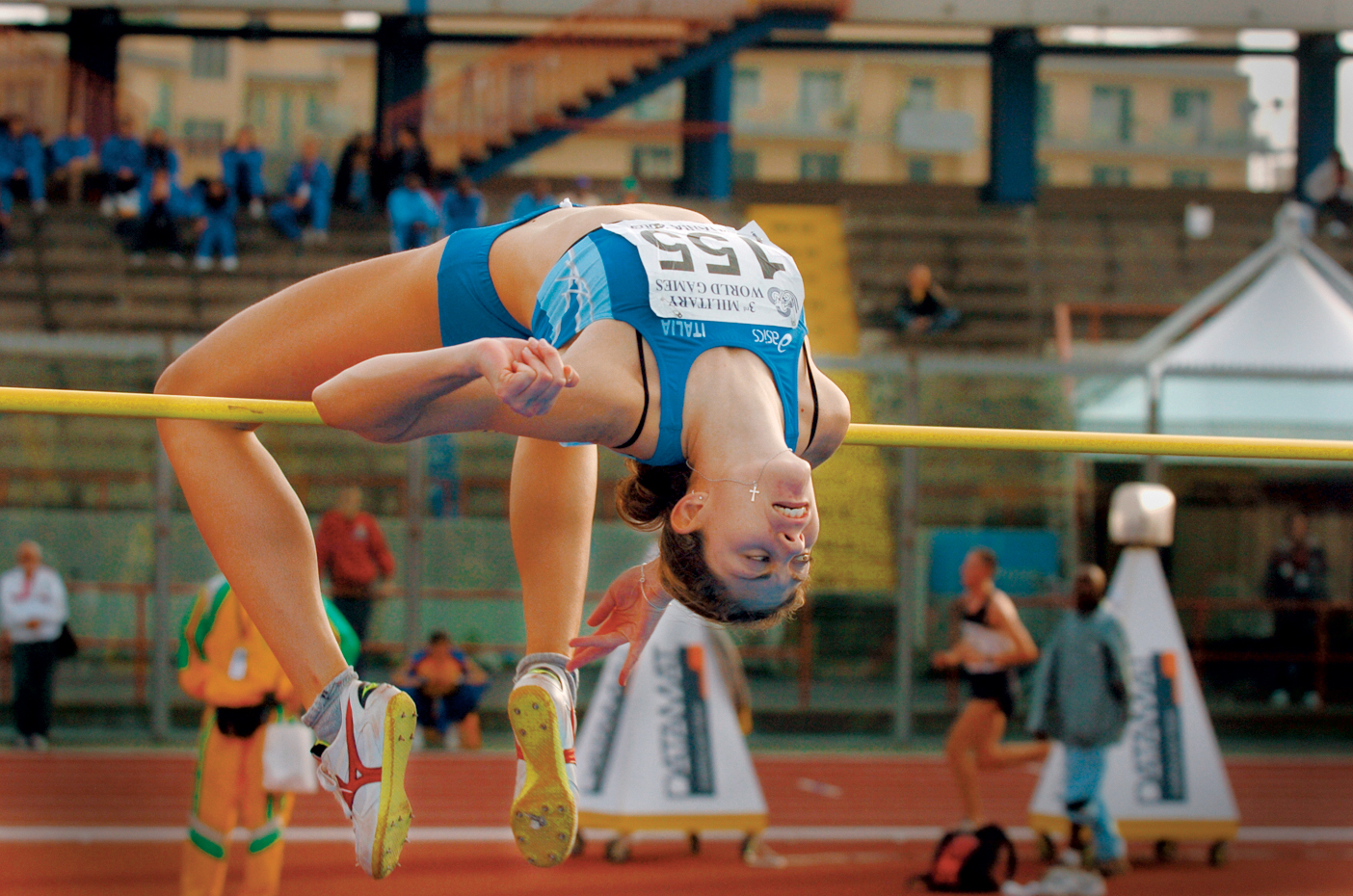

Personal information
- Nationality: Italian
- Born: March 22, 1977 (age 49) Livorno, Italy

Sport
- Country: Italy
- Sport: Athletics
- Event: High jump
- Club: G.S. Forestale

Achievements and titles
- Personal best: High jump: 1.92 m (1999)
Medal record
Women's athletics
Gymnasiade
Bronze medal – third place	Nicosia 1994	High jump

Daniela Galeotti (born 22 March 1977 in Livorno) is an Italian high jumper.

== Biography ==
She was 5th at 2003 Military World Games.

== National titles ==
Daniela Galeotti has won 3 times the individual national championship.

- 1 win in High jump (1999)
- 2 wins in High jump indoor (1999, 2001)
