= Laia Forcadell =

Spanish sprinter and hurdler

Personal information
- Full name: Laia Forcadell Arenas
- Nationality: Spain
- Born: 6 June 1982 (age 44) Tortosa, Tarragona, Catalonia, Spain
- Height: 1.73 m (5 ft 8 in)
- Weight: 59 kg (130 lb)

Sport
- Sport: Athletics
- Events: 400 metres, 400 metres hurdles
- Club: ISS L'Hospitalet
- Coached by: Armando Álvarez Anaya

Achievements and titles
- Personal bests: 400 m: 54.68 s (2008); 400 m hurdles: 56.24 s (2008)
Medal record
Women's athletics
Representing Spain
Ibero-American Championships
Gold medal – first place	2006 Ponce	400 m hurdles
Bronze medal – third place	2010 San Fernando	400 m hurdles

Laia Forcadell Arenas (born June 6, 1982 in Tortosa, Tarragona, Catalonia) is a female Spanish sprinter and hurdler. She won the gold medal for the 400 m hurdles at the 2006 Ibero-American Championships in Ponce, Puerto Rico, and bronze at the 2010 Ibero-American Championships in San Fernando, Cádiz, Spain.

Forcadell represented Spain at the 2008 Summer Olympics in Beijing, where she competed for the women's 400 m hurdles. She ran in the fourth heat against six other athletes, including Poland's Anna Jesień and Czech Republic's Zuzana Hejnová, who were both considered top medal contenders in this event. She finished the race in last place by eighty-eight hundredths of a second (0.88) behind Trinidad and Tobago's Josanne Lucas, with a time of 58.64 seconds. Forcadell failed to advance into the semi-finals, as she placed twenty-sixth overall, and was ranked farther below three mandatory slots for the next round.

Forcadell is a member of ISS L'Hospitalet Track Club in Barcelona, Spain, being coached and trained by Armando Álvarez Anaya.

== Competition record ==
Year	Competition	Venue	Position	Event	Notes
Representing Spain
2003	European U23 Championships	Bydgoszcz, Poland	19th (h)	400m hurdles	88.69
2004	World Indoor Championships	Budapest, Hungary	11th (h)	4 × 400 m relay	3:38.01
2004	Ibero-American Championships	Huelva, Spain	5th	400 m hurdles	57.72
2005	European Indoor Championships	Madrid, Spain	5th	4 × 400 m relay	3:39.73
2005	Mediterranean Games	Almería, Spain	9th (h)	400 m hurdles	57.78
2006	Ibero-American Championships	Ponce, Puerto Rico	1st	400 m hurdles	57.26
2006	European Championships	Gothenburg, Sweden	23rd (h)	400 m hurdles	57.81
2007	Universiade	Bangkok, Thailand	13th (h)	400 m hurdles	58.93
2008	Olympic Games	Beijing, China	26th (h)	400 m hurdles	58.64
2009	Mediterranean Games	Pescara, Italy	6th	400 m hurdles	57.85
2009	European Championships	Berlin, Germany	32nd (h)	400 m hurdles	58.57
2010	Ibero-American Championships	San Fernando, Spain	3rd	400 m hurdles	57.73
2010	European Championships	Barcelona, Spain	30th (h)	400 m hurdles	58.80
