= Lee McConnell =

Scottish athlete (born 1978)

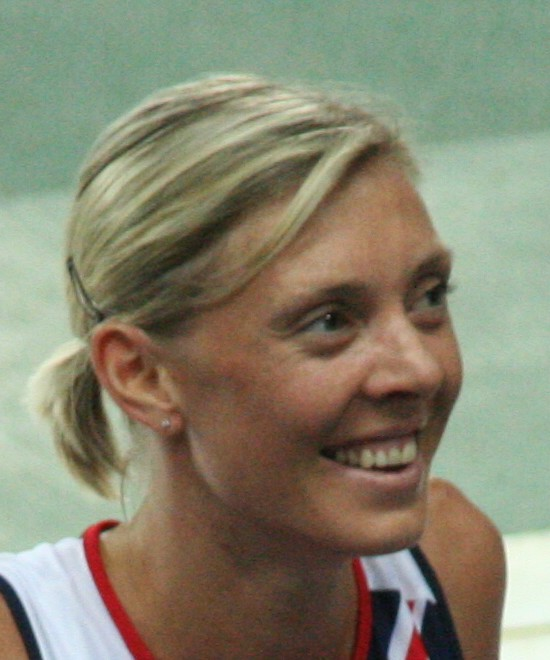
- Lee McConnell in Osaka 2007

Personal information
- Born: 9 October 1978 (age 48) Glasgow, Scotland
- Height: 1.77 m (5 ft 9 1/2 in)
- Weight: 64 kg (141 lb; 10 st 1 lb)

Sport
- Sport: Women's track and field
- Events: 400 m, 400 m hurdles, 4 x 400 m
- Club: Shaftesbury Barnet Harriers
- Turned pro: 2000
- Retired: 2014

Achievements and titles
- World finals: 2003 – 7th
- Highest world ranking: 8th (2002)
- Personal bests: 100 m 11.67 (2009); 200 m 23.16 (2008); 400 m 50.82 (2002); 400 m h 55.25 (2006); HJ 1.88 m (2000)
Medal record
Women's athletics
Representing Great Britain
World Championships
Bronze medal – third place	2005 Helsinki	4x400 m relay
Bronze medal – third place	2007 Osaka	4x400 m relay
Bronze medal – third place	2009 Berlin	4x400 m relay
Bronze medal – third place	2011 Daegu	4x400 m relay
World Indoor Championships
Bronze medal – third place	2010 Doha	4x400 m relay
European Championships
Bronze medal – third place	2002 Munich	400 m
Silver medal – second place	2010 Barcelona	4x400 m relay
European Indoor Championships
Silver medal – second place	2011 Paris	4x400 m relay
Bronze medal – third place	2005 Madrid	4x400 m relay
Bronze medal – third place	2007 Birmingham	4x400 m relay
Summer Universiade
Silver medal – second place	2001 Beijing	4x400 m relay
Bronze medal – third place	1999 Palma de Mallorca	4x400 m relay
Representing Scotland
Commonwealth Games
Silver medal – second place	2002 Manchester	400 m
Bronze medal – third place	2006 Melbourne	400 m Hurdles

Lee McConnell (born 9 October 1978) is a retired Scottish athlete, who competed in the 400 metres and 400 metres hurdles having started her career as a high jumper. She is a three-time Olympian who represented Great Britain in 2004, 2008 and 2012. With 12 medals from major championships, McConnell is the third most decorated Scottish track and field athlete of all-time (after Eilidh Doyle with 19 medals and Laura Muir with 13).

McConnell is a four-time World Championship bronze medallist in the 4 x 400 metres relay in 2005, 2007, 2009 and 2011, with the 2007 team setting the British record of 3:20.04. Her individual honours include winning a 2002 Commonwealth silver at 400 metres, 2002 European Championship bronze at 400 metres, and 2006 Commonwealth bronze at 400 metres hurdles.

== Career ==
Lee McConnell attended Holyrood R.C. Secondary School in Glasgow before graduating from Loughborough University in 2000 with a degree in Sports Science.

Originally a high jump (becoming Scottish champion in 1998, 1999 and 2000), before turning to the 400 m and then the 400 metres hurdles (winning Commonwealth Bronze in a PB time).

She was the Scottish 200 metres champion in 2002, and 2005. She also won the 400 m in 2001, and the 400 m at the AAA Championships in 2002.

Internationally, in 2002, McConnell won a bronze medal at the 2002 European championships in the 400 m, then added a Commonwealth Games silver in the 400 m. In 2003 at the European Cup, McConnell came second in both the 400 m and the 4 × 400 m relay. She went to finish fifth in the 400 m final at the 2003 World Championships.

Her personal best time over 400 m is 50.82 seconds.

After the 2007 season, McConnell decided to give up hurdling, as her transition from the flat had not been as successful as she had intended, and she returned to the 400 m flat. She broke the stadium record in the 400 m at the 2008 FBK Games, producing her fastest season opener.

At domestic level, McConnell later won the British 400 m title in 2008 and 2010, the British Inter-Counties 200 metres title in 2009, and two more Scottish 200 m titles (outdoor again in 2011 and indoor in 2013).

=== Relays ===
In addition to winning medals in individual contests, she has been a fairly successful relay runner. McConnell was known for participating in the Great Britain 4 × 400 m relay team at major events.

McConnell won bronze medals in the 4 × 400 m relay at the 2005 and 2007 World Championships. She ran the first leg in a team with Donna Fraser, Nicola Sanders and Christine Ohuruogu in 2005 and ran the third leg in team with Ohuruogu, Marilyn Okoro and Sanders in 2007, which a set a national record.

In addition at the World Championships, she ran the first leg for the 4 × 400 m relay teams that finished fifth in 2001, sixth in 2003, and fourth in 2009, also running fourth leg for the team that finished fourth in 2011 (both 2009 and 2011 were later upgraded to bronze medals).

McConnell alongside Fraser, Catherine Murphy, and Ohuruogu finished fourth in the 4 × 400 m relay at the 2004 Olympics, but could inherit bronze medals from this event as American athlete Crystal Cox was later found guilty of doping offences. Cox and not the US team had her medal revoked but that could still change.

At the 2012 Olympics, she ran the second leg as Great Britain finished fifth in the 4 × 400 m relay.

She has also accumulated relay medals from the 4 × 400 m event from the Universiade Games (in 2001), the European Championships (in 2002 and 2010, the latter was upgraded to silver from bronze) and the European Indoor Championships (in 2005, 2007 and 2011).

For Scotland, McConnell ran in the 4 × 400 m relay at the Commonwealth Games in 2002 and 2010 (where a national record was set).

=== Retirement ===
McConnell missed the 2013 season after becoming pregnant with her first child. She returned to training nine weeks after giving birth to her son with a view to competing at the 2014 Commonwealth Games in her hometown of Glasgow – however she announced her immediate retirement from athletics in April 2014.

=== Awards ===
McConnell was voted Scottish Athlete of the Year in 2002, 2003 and 2007 by Scottish Athletics. She also received the George Dallas Trophy in 2002.

During the SAAA years, she was previously awarded the Coronation Cup in 2002 & 2003 for being the outstanding Scottish Athlete of that year, the 2001 Crabbie Cup for most meritorious performance at the Scottish Championships, and the 1994 TBS Challenge Trophy for the outstanding performance at the U17 Scottish Championships.

In 2018, McConnell was one of fifteen athletes inducted in to the Scottish Athletics Hall of Fame.

== International competitions ==
Year	Competition	Venue	Position	Event	Notes
Representing the Great Britain and Scotland
1999	European U23 Championships	Gothenburg, Sweden	12th	High jump	1.82 m
2001	Summer Universiade	Beijing, China	2nd	4 × 400 m relay	3:30.40
2002	Commonwealth Games	Manchester, United Kingdom	2nd	400 m	51.68
2002	Commonwealth Games	Manchester, United Kingdom	4th	4 × 400 m relay	3:31.50
2002	European Championships	Munich, Germany	3rd	400 m	51.02
2002	European Championships	Munich, Germany	4th	4 × 400 m relay	3:26.65
2003	World Championships	Paris, France	7th	400 m	51.07
2003	World Championships	Paris, France	6th	4 × 400 m relay	3:26.67
2004	Olympic Games	Athens, Greece	23rd (sf)	400 m	52.63
2004	Olympic Games	Athens, Greece	4th	4 × 400 m relay	3:25.12
2005	European Indoor Championships	Madrid, Spain	3rd	4 × 400 m relay	3:29.81
2005	World Championships	Helsinki, Finland	12th (sf)	400 m	51.15
2005	World Championships	Helsinki, Finland	3rd	4 × 400 m relay	3:24.44
2006	Commonwealth Games	Melbourne, Australia	3rd	400 m hurdles	55.25
2006	European Championships	Gothenburg, Sweden	9th (sf)	400 m hurdles	55.61
2006	European Championships	Gothenburg, Sweden	4th	4 × 400 m relay	3:28.17
2006	European Cup Super League	Málaga, Spain	3rd	4 × 400 m relay	3:26.98
2007	European Indoor Championships	Birmingham, United Kingdom	3rd	4 × 400 m relay	3:28.69
2007	World Championships	Osaka, Japan	14th (sf)	400 m	51.07
2007	World Championships	Osaka, Japan	3rd	4 × 400 m relay	3:20.04
2008	Olympic Games	Beijing, China	19th (sf)	400 m	52.11
2009	European Team Championships	Leiria, Portugal	4th	400 m	51.92
2009	European Team Championships	Leiria, Portugal	3rd	4 × 400 m	3:29.29
2009	World Championships	Berlin, Germany	4th	4 × 400 m relay	3:25.16
2010	European Championships	Barcelona, Spain	12th (h)	400 m	53.15
2010	European Championships	Barcelona, Spain	3rd	4 × 400 m relay	3:24.32
2010	Commonwealth Games	Delhi, India	5th	200 m	23.68
2010	Commonwealth Games	Delhi, India	4th	400 m	52.36
2010	Commonwealth Games	Delhi, India	4th	4 × 400 m relay	3:30.91
2011	European Indoor Championships	Paris, France	2nd	4 × 400 m relay	3:31.36
2011	European Team Championships	Stockholm, Sweden	2nd	4 × 400 m relay	3:27.27
2012	Olympic Games	London, United Kingdom	18th (sf)	400 m	52.24
2012	Olympic Games	London, United Kingdom	5th	4 × 400 m relay	3:24.76
(h) = overall position in preliminary heats (sf) = overall position in semifinals

== Personal life ==
McConnell is a rugby union fan, and is supporter of the Glasgow Warriors and the Scotland national team.
