= Marshevet Hooker =

American sprinter (born 1984)

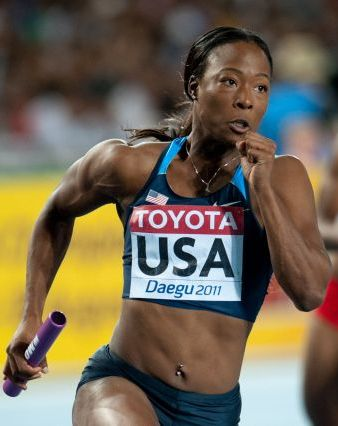
- Hooker at the 2011 World Championships Athletics in Daegu.

Personal information
- Nationality: American
- Born: Marshevet Hooker; September 25, 1984 (age 41)
- Height: 5 ft 9 in (175 cm)
- Weight: 148 lb (67 kg)

Sport
- Sport: Running
- Event(s): 100 meters, 200 meters
- College team: University of Texas
Medal record
Women's athletics
Representing the United States
World Championships
Gold medal – first place	2011 Daegu	4 × 100 m relay
World Athletics Final
Silver medal – second place	2008 Stuttgart	200 m
Bronze medal – third place	2008 Stuttgart	100 m
World Junior Championships
Bronze medal – third place	2002 Kingston	100 meters
Silver medal – second place	2002 Kingston	4 × 100 m relay

Marshevet Hooker (born September 25, 1984) is a professional sprinter, competing internationally for the United States and sponsored by adidas. Hooker participated in the 2008 Summer Olympics at Beijing, China, finishing 5th in the 200 metres. In the 100 meters, Hooker became the fifth-fastest woman up to that point (under any conditions) when she ran a wind-aided 10.76 (+3.4) to win the first heat of the 100 m quarterfinals at the 2008 Olympic Trials.

In June 2006, Hooker elected to forgo her final season of collegiate eligibility to pursue a professional track and field career. Hooker, an eight-time All-American, left the University of Texas as one of the most decorated student-athletes in the program's history.

Hooker, a corporate communications major, made her mark as one of the top athletes in collegiate track and field during the 2005 outdoor season, when she helped Texas to its fourth NCAA outdoor title. Hooker became UT's third NCAA 100-meter champion and its first since 1991, when she claimed the event in 11.14 seconds. She also anchored the 4 × 100-meter relay team to victory in 42.87, the third-fastest time in school history. Hooker took second in the long jump, finishing only behind eventual World champion and Olympic gold medalist Tianna Madison.

Hooker was coached by Olympic gold medalist Jon Drummond.

== Career highlights ==
- 1st at 2011 World Champion in 4x100
- 5th at 2008 Beijing Olympics in 200 m
- 3rd at 2008 Olympic Trials in 200 m
- 4th at 2008 Olympic Trials in 100 m
- 2006 NCAA Indoor 60 m and LJ champion
- Two-time Big 12 Women's Indoor Track Athlete of the Year (2005 and 2006)
- 2005 NCAA 100 m and 4 × 100 m champion

== Personal bests ==
- 100 meters – 10.86 2011(10.76w)
- 200 meters – 22.34 2008(22.20w)

== Personal life ==
Her sister, Destinee Hooker, is an indoor volleyball player who competed in the 2012 Summer Olympics.
