= 2008 IAAF World Athletics Final =

International track and field competition

The 6th IAAF World Athletics Final was held at the Mercedes-Benz Arena in Stuttgart, Germany on September 13 and September 14, 2008.

A number of road races also took place on the second day of competition. There were seven different starting points around the Stuttgart area and the distances varied from 21 to 30 kilometres, with every race finishing in the Arena. Runners could join mid-race at specified times to allow for shorter distances and the aim was to have the runners finishing at a similar time. The road race ceremony was inspired by a similar event during the 1993 World Championships in Athletics, which was also held in the city.

== Results ==
=== Men ===
Event	Gold		Silver		Bronze	
100 m	Asafa Powell; Jamaica	9.87	Nesta Carter; Jamaica	10.07	Michael Frater; Jamaica	10.10
200 m	Stéphane Buckland; Mauritius	20.57	Paul Hession; Ireland	20.58	Brendan Christian; Antigua and Barbuda	20.61
400 m	LaShawn Merritt; United States	44.50	Jeremy Wariner; United States	44.51	Chris Brown; Bahamas	45.36
800 m	Alfred Kirwa Yego; Kenya	1:49.05	Abraham Chepkirwok; Uganda	1:49.22	Yusuf Saad Kamel; Bahrain	1:49.40
1500 m	Haron Keitany; Kenya	3:37.92	Asbel Kipruto Kiprop; Kenya	3:37.93	Nicholas Willis; New Zealand	3:38.22
3000 m	Bernard Lagat; United States	8:02.97	Edwin Cheruiyot Soi; Kenya	8:03.55	Matthew Tegenkamp; United States	8:03.56
5000 m	Edwin Cheruiyot Soi; Kenya	13:22.81	Moses Ndiema Kipsiro; Uganda	13:23.02	Micah Kogo; Kenya	13:23.37
3000 m steeplechase	Paul Kipsiele Koech; Kenya	8:05.35	Ezekiel Kemboi; Kenya	8:15.32	Richard Kipkemboi Mateelong; Kenya	8:16.05
110 m hurdles	David Oliver; United States	13.22	Petr Svoboda; Czech Republic	13.33	Ryan Wilson; United States	13.54
400 m hurdles	Kerron Clement; United States	48.96	Danny McFarlane; Jamaica	49.00	Isa Phillips; Jamaica	49.22
High jump	Andrey Silnov; Russia	2.35 CR	Stefan Holm; Sweden	2.33	Jesse Williams; United States	2.29
Pole vault	Derek Miles; United States	5.80	Brad Walker; United States	5.70	Maksym Mazuryk; Ukraine	5.60
Long jump	Fabrice Lapierre; Australia	8.14	Hussein Taher Al-Sabee; Saudi Arabia	8.13	Mohamed Salman Al Khuwalidi; Saudi Arabia	8.04
Triple jump	Nelson Évora; Portugal	17.24	Jadel Gregório; Brazil	17.09	Randy Lewis; Grenada	17.01
Shot put	Tomasz Majewski; Poland	20.88	Christian Cantwell; United States	20.73	Dan Taylor; United States	20.38
Discus	Gerd Kanter; Estonia	68.38	Piotr Małachowski; Poland	66.07	Robert Harting; Germany	65.76
Hammer	Primož Kozmus; Slovenia	79.99	Krisztián Pars; Hungary	79.37	Koji Murofushi; Japan	78.99
Javelin	Vadims Vasilevskis; Latvia	86.65	Andreas Thorkildsen; Norway	83.77	Tero Pitkämäki; Finland	81.64
WR world record | AR area record | CR championship record | GR games record | NR national record | OR Olympic record | PB personal best | SB season best | WL world leading (in a given season)

=== Women ===
Event	Gold		Silver		Bronze	
100 m	Shelly-Ann Fraser; Jamaica	10.94	Kerron Stewart; Jamaica	11.06	Marshevet Hooker; United States	11.06
200 m	Sanya Richards; United States	22.50	Marshevet Hooker; United States	22.69	Kerron Stewart; Jamaica	22.72
400 m	Sanya Richards; United States	50.41	Christine Ohuruogu; Great Britain	50.83	Novlene Williams; Jamaica	51.30
800 m	Pamela Jelimo; Kenya	1:56.23 CR	Janeth Jepkosgei; Kenya	1:58.41	Marilyn Okoro; Great Britain	1:58.64
1500 m	Maryam Yusuf Jamal; Bahrain	4:06.59	Gelete Burka; Ethiopia	4:07.45	Iryna Lishchynska; Ukraine	4:07.65
3000 m	Meseret Defar; Ethiopia	8:43.60	Vivian Cheruiyot; Kenya	8:44.64	Jane Kiptoo; Kenya	8.47.65
5000 m	Meseret Defar; Ethiopia	14:53.82	Vivian Cheruiyot; Kenya	14:54.60	Meselech Melkamu; Ethiopia	14:58.76
3000 m steeplechase	Gulnara Galkina; Russia	9:21.73 CR	Eunice Jepkorir; Kenya	9:24.03	Ruth Bisibori Nyangau; Kenya	9:24.38
100 m hurdles	LoLo Jones; United States	12.56	Delloreen Ennis-London; Jamaica	12.56	Dawn Harper Nelson; United States	12.67
400 m hurdles	Melaine Walker; Jamaica	54.06	Anastasiya Rabchenyuk; Ukraine	54.92	Tiffany Williams; United States	55.16
High jump	Blanka Vlašić; Croatia	2.01 CR	Anna Chicherova; Russia	1.99	Tia Hellebaut; Belgium	1.97
Pole vault	Silke Spiegelburg; Germany	4.70	Svetlana Feofanova; Russia	4.70	Monika Pyrek; Poland	4.70
Long jump	Naide Gomes; Portugal	6.71	Ksenija Balta; Estonia	6.65	Tatyana Lebedeva; Russia	6.64
Triple jump	Anna Pyatykh; Russia	14.78	Tatyana Lebedeva; Russia	14.63	Marija Šestak; Slovenia	14.63
Shot put	Valerie Vili; New Zealand	19.69	Nadine Kleinert; Germany	19.42	Misleydis González; Cuba	18.55
Discus	Nicoleta Grasu; Romania	62.48	Stephanie Brown-Trafton; United States	62.23	Vera Pospíšilová-Cechlová; Czech Republic	58.72
Hammer	Yipsi Moreno; Cuba	74.09	Martina Hrasnová; Slovakia	71.40	Anita Wlodarczyk; Poland	70.97
Javelin	Barbora Špotáková; Czech Republic	72.28 WR	Christina Obergföll; Germany	63.28	Steffi Nerius; Germany	62.78
WR world record | AR area record | CR championship record | GR games record | NR national record | OR Olympic record | PB personal best | SB season best | WL world leading (in a given season)

- Josephine Onyia of Spain was the original women's 100 m hurdles winner. She had tested positive for stimulant methylhexaneamine at the 2008 Athletissima meeting and also tested positive for Clenbuterol at the 2008 World Athletics Final, meaning her results were annulled.
- The original discus winner, Yarelys Barrios of Cuba, was retrospectively disqualified due to a failed doping test at the 2008 Summer Olympics.
