= Linda Horvath =

Austrian high jumper

Personal information
- Nationality: Austrian
- Born: 10 February 1978 (age 48) Hartberg, Austria

Sport
- Sport: Athletics
- Event: High jump

Linda Maria Horvath (born 10 February 1978) is an Austrian athlete. She competed in the women's high jump at the 2000 Summer Olympics.
