= Amewu Mensah =

German high jumper

Amewu Mensah (born 21 March 1977) is a German high jumper of Ghanaian descent.

At the 1999 World Championships she reached the final, but failed to clear the opening height there. In June 2000 in Rehlingen she achieved a career best jump of 1.94 metres. Two months later she finished eighth at the 2000 Olympics, equalling her personal best result.

She became German champion in 2000 and won her only national indoor medal in the same year, a silver medal. She represented the clubs TSV Bayer 04 Leverkusen and OSC Berlin.

In June 2001, again in Rehlingen, she tested positive for the anabolic steroid oxandrolone. She received a suspension from the sport which lasted between July 2001 and July 2003.

== See also ==
- List of sportspeople sanctioned for doping offences
