= Michelle Carey (athlete) =

Irish athlete

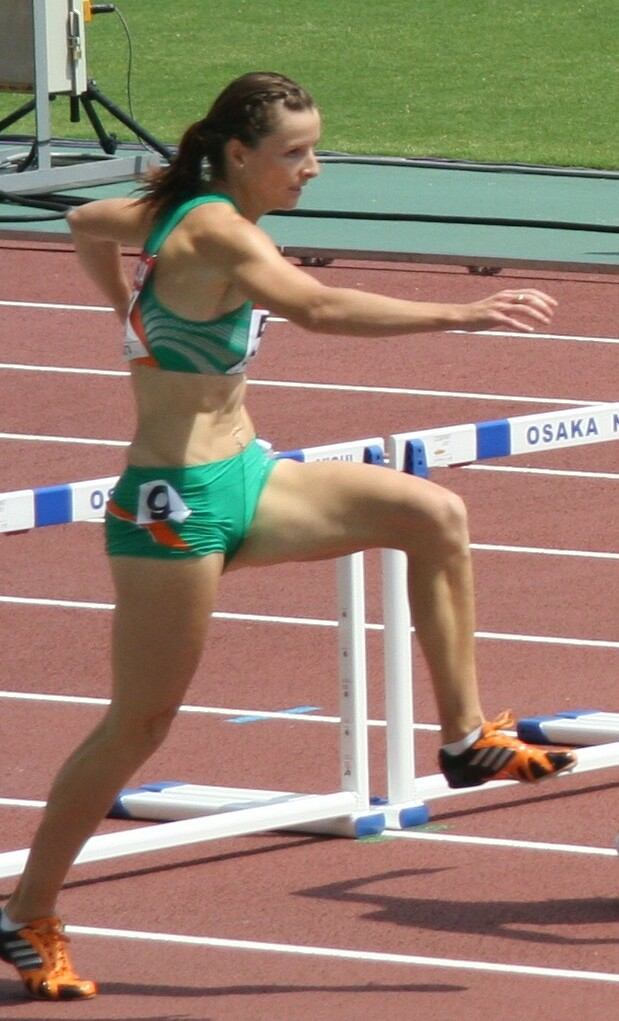
- Carey in Osaka, 2007

Personal information
- Born: 20 March 1981 (age 44) Dublin, Ireland
- Height: 1.69 m (5 ft 6 1/2 in)
- Weight: 57 kg (126 lb)

Sport
- Country: Ireland
- Sport: Athletics
- Event: 4 × 400m Relay 400m Hurdles

Michelle Carey (now Parker) (born 20 March 1981) is an Irish athlete who competed at the 2012 Summer Olympics in the Women's 4 × 400 metres relay. The team lost out in the first round. She specialises in the 400 metres hurdles and represented Ireland in that event at the World Championships in Athletics in 2007 and 2009.
