= Anastasiya Rabchenyuk =

Ukrainian hurdler (born 1983)

Anastasiya Rabchenyuk (Ukrainian: Анастасія Рабченюк; born 14 September 1983) is a Ukrainian hurdler.

== Life ==
She was born in Ternivka, in the Ukrainian SSR of the Soviet Union (today in the Dnipropetrovsk Oblast of Ukraine).

== Career ==
She finished eighth at the 2006 European Championships, fourth at the 2008 Olympic Games, second at the 2008 World Athletics Final, seventh at the 2009 World Championships. At European Athletics Championships 2010 in Barcelona, while she was in the warm-up area few minutes before the 1st round heat, she experienced a muscular problem. Nevertheless, she ran her heat but did not proceed to semi-final. Because of the mentioned problem, she did not compete anymore during 2010. In 2011, she obtained fifth position in the World Championships in Daegu, South Korea.

The 2011 season did not successfully. In May 2011 she only achieved 3rd position at Ukraine Cup Competition in Yalta. This result did not allow her to represent Ukraine in Stockholm at June 2011 SPAR European Team Championships (Ukraine was represented by the winner of Ukraine Cup Hanna Titimets who achieved the 4th position in that race). The 2011 season started to improve on 3 June when she won the ENEA Cup in Bydgoszcz (Poland) with the time of 55.54 and then reported the 3rd position on 13 June at the EAA Premium Meeting in Prague with the time of 55.74.

She definitely regained her position in the top list of 400m hurdles of 2011 on 3 August in Donetsk during the semifinal of the Ukrainian Championship by running in 54.75. This timing places her as 10th best athlete in the 2011 top list of 400m hurdles (See IAAF Top Lists at IAAF's site). As the preparation for 2011 season has been focused on the Daegu's World Championships on late August 2011, it is possible that she has still some room to improve and that she will be a serious contender in Daegu.

In Daegu at World Championships 2011 she passed easily the heats obtaining the second position of her race with 55.08 behind Kaliese Spencer of Jamaica, being inserted in the second semifinals, the most challenging of the three semifinals whose formula promoted to final only first two athletes of each of those three races plus the two best timings among all other runners. In fact, on that semifinal race competed the Defending Olympic and World Champion Melanie Walker from Jamaica, the current European Champion Natalya Antyukh from Russia, plus two others top list runners, Queen Harrison from the United States and Anastasiya Rabchenyuk for a total of four top level athletes in a single race for only two places available for direct qualification to final.

She was able to catch the third position of the race, being passed by World Champion Melanie Walker in the battle for second place only at last metres (that semifinal was won by Natalya Antyukh). Nevertheless, her timing of 55.06 resulted as the 2nd better timing among all the athletes not directly qualified to the final (she ran 00.01 secs faster than the first athlete excluded from the final, Perri Shakes-Drayton from Great Britain) allowing her to reach the eight (and last) place in the final of World Championships 2011.

In the final race, she obtained a fifth position with her Season Best of 54.18, improving two positions from the first final she participated at World Championships of Berlin 2009 where she arrived seventh.

She also competed at the 2007 World Championships without reaching the final, and also in the 4 x 400 metres relay at the 2009 World Championships. She won the bronze medal at the 2003 Universiade and the silver medal at the 2007 Universiade.

Her personal best time is 53.96 seconds, achieved at the 2008 Olympics. She has 52.64 seconds in the 400 metres, achieved in July 2006 in Kyiv.
