= 1971 European Athletics Championships – Women's high jump =

Women's high jump at the European Athletics Championships

The women's high jump at the 1971 European Athletics Championships was held in Helsinki, Finland, at Helsinki Olympic Stadium on 11 and 12 August 1971.

== Medalists ==
Gold	Ilona Gusenbauer; Austria
Silver	Cornelia Popescu; Romania
Silver	Barbara Inkpen; Great Britain

== Results ==
=== Final ===
12 August

Rank	Name	Nationality	Result	Notes
1st place, gold medalist(s)	Ilona Gusenbauer	Austria	1.87	CR
2nd place, silver medalist(s)	Cornelia Popescu	Romania	1.85	
2nd place, silver medalist(s)	Barbara Inkpen	Great Britain	1.85	NR
4	Rita Schmidt	East Germany	1.83	
5	Miroslava Hübnerová	Czechoslovakia	1.83	
6	Renate Gärtner	West Germany	1.81	
7	Milada Karbanová	Czechoslovakia	1.78	
8	Snežana Hrepevnik	Yugoslavia	1.78	
9	Sara Simeoni	Italy	1.78	NR
10	Karen Mack	West Germany	1.78	
11	Kari Hedenstad	Norway	1.75	
12	Danuta Konowska	Poland	1.75	
13	Valentina Chulkova	Soviet Union	1.75	
14	Solveig Langkilde	Denmark	1.75	
15	Antonina Lazareva	Soviet Union	1.75	
16	Magdolna Komka	Hungary	1.75	
16	Breda Babošek	Yugoslavia	1.75	
18	Grith Ejstrup	Denmark	1.70	
18	Alena Prosková	Czechoslovakia	1.70	
18	Vera Gavrilova	Soviet Union	1.70	
21	Annemieke Bouma	Netherlands	1.70	
21	Gloria Garrido	France	1.70	
23	Linda Hedmark	Sweden	1.70	
24	Beatrix Rechner	Switzerland	1.70	
25	Doris Bisang	Switzerland	1.70	
26	Marjan Ackermans	Netherlands	1.65	
27	Roswitha Emonts-Gast	Belgium	1.60	

=== Qualification ===
11 August

Rank	Name	Nationality	Result	Notes
	Miroslava Hübnerová	Czechoslovakia	1.73	Q
	Solveig Langkilde	Denmark	1.73	Q
	Vera Gavrilova	Soviet Union	1.73	Q
	Breda Babošek	Yugoslavia	1.73	Q
	Rita Schmidt	East Germany	1.73	Q
	Grith Ejstrup	Denmark	1.73	Q
	Marjan Ackermans	Netherlands	1.73	Q
	Valentina Chulkova	Soviet Union	1.73	Q
	Barbara Inkpen	Great Britain	1.73	Q
	Danuta Konowska	Poland	1.73	Q
	Magdolna Komka	Hungary	1.73	Q
	Gloria Garrido	France	1.73	Q
	Beatrix Rechner	Switzerland	1.73	Q
	Karen Mack	West Germany	1.73	Q
	Linda Hedmark	Sweden	1.73	Q
	Annemieke Bouma	Netherlands	1.73	Q
	Renate Gärtner	West Germany	1.73	Q
	Kari Hedenstad	Norway	1.73	Q
	Antonina Lazareva	Soviet Union	1.73	Q
	Milada Karbanová	Czechoslovakia	1.73	Q
	Sara Simeoni	Italy	1.73	Q
	Roswitha Emonts-Gast	Belgium	1.73	Q
	Ilona Gusenbauer	Austria	1.73	Q
	Snežana Hrepevnik	Yugoslavia	1.73	Q
	Alena Prosková	Czechoslovakia	1.73	Q
	Cornelia Popescu	Romania	1.73	Q
	Doris Bisang	Switzerland	1.73	Q
	Marie-Christine Debourse	France	1.71	
	Erika Rudolf	Hungary	1.71	
	Vanja Paleka	Yugoslavia	1.68	
	Ulrike Meyfarth	West Germany	1.68	
	Ruth Watt	Great Britain	1.68	
	Florence Picaut	France	1.65	
	Silvia Massenz	Italy	1.65	
	Isabella Pigato	Italy	1.55	

== Participation ==
According to an unofficial count, 35 athletes from 18 countries participated in the event.

- Austria (1)
- Belgium (1)
- Czechoslovakia (3)
- Denmark (2)
- East Germany (1)
- France (3)
- Hungary (2)
- Italy (3)
- Netherlands (2)
- Norway (1)
- Poland (1)
- Romania (1)
- Soviet Union (3)
- Sweden (1)
- Switzerland (2)
- Great Britain (2)
- West Germany (3)
- Yugoslavia (3)
