= 1969 European Athletics Championships – Women's high jump =

Women's high jump at the European Athletics Championships

The women's high jump at the 1969 European Athletics Championships was held in Athens, Greece, at Georgios Karaiskakis Stadium on 16 and 18 September 1969.

== Medalists ==
Gold	Miloslava Rezková; Czechoslovakia
Silver	Antonina Lazareva; Soviet Union
Bronze	Mária Mračnová; Czechoslovakia

== Results ==
=== Final ===
18 September

Rank	Name	Nationality	Result	Notes
1st place, gold medalist(s)	Miloslava Rezková	Czechoslovakia	1.83	CR
2nd place, silver medalist(s)	Antonina Lazareva	Soviet Union	1.83	CR
3rd place, bronze medalist(s)	Mária Mračnová	Czechoslovakia	1.83	CR
4	Rita Schmidt	East Germany	1.83	CR
5	Karin Schulze	East Germany	1.77	
6	Snežana Hrepevnik	Yugoslavia	1.77	
7	Ilona Gusenbauer	Austria	1.77	
8	Barbara Inkpen	Great Britain	1.77	
9	Ghislaine Barnay	France	1.74	
10	Jaroslava Valentová	Czechoslovakia	1.74	
11	Dorothy Shirley	Great Britain	1.74	
12	Nina Bryntseva	Soviet Union	1.71	
13	Yordanka Blagoeva	Bulgaria	1.68	

=== Qualification ===
16 September

Rank	Name	Nationality	Result	Notes
	Dorothy Shirley	Great Britain	1.74	Q
	Mária Mračnová	Czechoslovakia	1.74	Q
	Nina Bryntseva	Soviet Union	1.74	Q
	Yordanka Blagoeva	Bulgaria	1.74	Q
	Antonina Lazareva	Soviet Union	1.74	Q
	Ilona Gusenbauer	Austria	1.74	Q
	Miloslava Rezková	Czechoslovakia	1.74	Q
	Rita Schmidt	East Germany	1.74	Q
	Ghislaine Barnay	France	1.74	Q
	Snežana Hrepevnik	Yugoslavia	1.74	Q
	Jaroslava Valentová	Czechoslovakia	1.74	Q
	Barbara Inkpen	Great Britain	1.74	Q
	Karin Schulze	East Germany	1.74	Q
	Danuta Berezowska	Poland	1.71	
	Magdolna Csábi	Hungary	1.71	
	Danuta Konowska	Poland	1.71	
	Valentina Kozyr	Soviet Union	1.71	
	Nicole Denis	France	1.71	
	Virginia Ioan	Romania	1.71	
	Kari Karlsen	Norway	1.68	
	Anne Lise Wærness	Norway	1.68	
	Moira Walls	Great Britain	1.65	
	Beatrice Rechner	Switzerland	1.65	

== Participation ==
According to an unofficial count, 23 athletes from 13 countries participated in the event.

- Austria (1)
- Bulgaria (1)
- Czechoslovakia (3)
- East Germany (2)
- France (2)
- Hungary (1)
- Norway (2)
- Poland (2)
- Romania (1)
- Soviet Union (3)
- Switzerland (1)
- Great Britain (3)
- Yugoslavia (1)
