= Athletics at the 1972 Summer Olympics – Women's high jump =

Women's high jump at the Games of the XX Olympiad
- Venue: Olympic Stadium, Munich, West Germany
- Date: September 3 & 4
- Competitors: 40 from 22 nations
- Winning height: 1.92

Medalists
1st place, gold medalist(s)		Ulrike Meyfarth; West Germany
2nd place, silver medalist(s)		Yordanka Blagoeva; Bulgaria
3rd place, bronze medalist(s)		Ilona Gusenbauer; Austria

These are the official results of the Women's high jump event at the 1972 Summer Olympics in Munich. The competition was held on 3 and 4 of September. Austrian Ilona Gusenbauer was the favorite after her 1971 European Athletics Championships victory. There were 40 jumpers and 23 qualified for the final making it a long day for the jumpers involved with such a big field. This competition still used a mixture of the straddle technique and the newer Fosbury Flop technique. Meyfarth at the age of 16 years, 123 days, was and still is the youngest winner of an individual medal in athletics.

== Results ==
All jumpers reaching 1.76 m (5 ft 9 1/2 in) and the top 12 including ties qualified for the finals. All qualifiers are listed in blue. All heights are listed in metres.

=== Qualifying ===
Rank	Name	Nationality	Group	Mark	1.60	1.65	1.70	1.73	1.76
1T	Ilona Gusenbauer	Austria	A	1.76	p	p	o	o	o
1T	Yordanka Blagoeva	Bulgaria	A	1.76	p	p	o	o	o
1T	Grith Ejstrup	Denmark	B	1.76	p	p	o	o	o
1T	Rita Gildemeister	East Germany	A	1.76	p	p	o	o	o
1T	Rita Schmidt	East Germany	A	1.76	p	p	o	o	o
6T	Debbie Brill	Canada	B	1.76	p	o	o	o	o
6T	Rosemarie Witschas	East Germany	A	1.76	p	o	o	o	o
6T	Renate Gärtner	West Germany	A	1.76	p	o	o	o	o
6T	Ulrike Meyfarth	West Germany	A	1.76	p	o	o	o	o
6T	Ellen Mundinger	West Germany	A	1.76	p	o	o	o	o
6T	Sara Simeoni	Italy	B	1.76	p	o	o	o	o
6T	Audrey Reid	Jamaica	A	1.76	p	o	o	o	o
6T	Ria Ahlers	Netherlands	A	1.76	p	o	o	o	o
6T	Cornelia Popescu	Romania	A	1.76	p	o	o	o	o
15	Snežana Hrepevnik	Yugoslavia	A	1.76	o	o	xxo	xxo	o
16	Solveig Langkilde	Denmark	A	1.76	p	p	o	o	xo
17T	Erika Rudolf	Hungary	A	1.76	p	o	o	o	xo
17T	Andrea Bruce	Jamaica	B	1.76	p	o	o	o	xo
19	Alena Prosková	Czechoslovakia	A	1.76	o	o	o	o	xo
20T	Milada Karbanová	Czechoslovakia	A	1.76	o	o	xo	o	xo
20T	Miloslava Hübnerová	Czechoslovakia	A	1.76	o	xo	o	o	xo
22	Barbara Inkpen	Great Britain	A	1.76	o	o	xxo	o	xo
23	Magdolna Komka	Hungary	A	1.76	p	o	o	o	xxo
24	Breda Babošek	Yugoslavia	A	1.73	p	o	xo	o	xxx
25	Marima Rodríguez	Cuba	A	1.73	p	p	xxo	o	xxx
26	Antonina Lazaryeva	Soviet Union	A	1.73	p	o	o	xo	xxx
27	Rosaline Few	Great Britain	B	1.73	o	o	o	xo	xxx
28	Beatrix Rechner	Switzerland	B	1.73	p	xo	xo	xo	xxx
29	Louise Hanna-Walker	Canada	B	1.73	o	o	o	xxo	xxx
30T	Penelope Dimmock	Great Britain	B	1.70	o	o	o	xxx	
30T	Deanne Wilson	United States	B	1.70	o	o	o	xxx	
32	Cindy Gilbert	United States	B	1.70	xo	o	xxo	xxx	
33T	Michiyo Inaoka	Japan	B	1.65	o	o	xxx		
33T	Doris Bisang	Switzerland	B	1.65	o	o	xxx		
35T	Mihoko Yama	Japan	B	1.65	o	xo	xxx		
35T	Roxana Vulescu	Romania	B	1.65	o	xo	xxx		
37	Lára Sveinsdóttir	Iceland	B	1.60	o	xxx			
38	Sandi Goldsberry	United States	B	1.60	xo	xxx			
–	Nnenna Njoku	Nigeria	B	NM	xxx				
–	Wu Yu-chih	Republic of China	B	NM	xxx				
–	Galina Filatova	Soviet Union	A	DNS					
–	Margit Papp	Hungary	A	DNS					
–	Kari Karlsen	Norway	B	DNS					
–	Maria Luisa Vilca	Peru	B	DNS					
–	Gladys Chaingmei	Malaysia	B	DNS					

=== Final ===
Rank	Name	Nationality	Mark	1.60	1.66	1.71	1.76	1.79	1.82	1.85	1.88	1.90	1.92	1.94
1st place, gold medalist(s)	Ulrike Meyfarth	West Germany	1.92; WR	p	p	o	o	o	o	o	o	xo	o	xxx
2nd place, silver medalist(s)	Yordanka Blagoeva	Bulgaria	1.88	p	p	o	o	o	o	o	o	xxx		
3rd place, bronze medalist(s)	Ilona Gusenbauer	Austria	1.88	p	p	xo	xo	o	o	xxo	xo	xxx		
4	Barbara Inkpen	Great Britain	1.85	p	o	o	o	o	o	o	xxx			
5	Rita Schmidt	East Germany	1.85	p	p	o	o	o	o	xo	xxx			
6	Sara Simeoni	Italy	1.85	p	p	o	o	o	xo	xo	xxx			
7	Rosemarie Witschas	East Germany	1.85	p	o	o	o	o	o	xxo	xxx			
8	Debbie Brill	Canada	1.82	p	p	o	o	o	o	xxx				
9	Andrea Bruce	Jamaica	1.82	p	o	o	o	o	o	xxx				
10	Ellen Mundinger	West Germany	1.82	p	p	o	o	xo	o	xxx				
11	Audrey Reid	Jamaica	1.82	p	p	o	xo	xo	o	xxx				
12T	Grith Ejstrup	Denmark	1.82	p	p	o	o	o	xo	xxx				
12T	Rita Gildemeister	East Germany	1.82	p	p	o	o	o	xo	xxx				
14	Renate Gärtner	West Germany	1.82	p	p	o	o	o	xxo	xxx				
15	Miloslava Hübnerová	Czechoslovakia	1.82	p	o	o	xo	o	xxo	xxx				
16T	Erika Rudolf	Hungary	1.79	p	o	o	o	o	xxx					
16T	Ria Ahlers	Netherlands	1.79	p	o	o	o	o	xxx					
18	Alena Prosková	Czechoslovakia	1.79	p	p	xo	o	o	xxx					
19	Cornelia Popescu	Romania	1.76	p	o	o	o	xxx						
20	Snežana Hrepevnik	Yugoslavia	1.76	o	o	o	o	xxx						
21	Solveig Langkilde	Denmark	1.76	p	p	p	xo	xxx						
22	Milada Karbanová	Czechoslovakia	1.76	p	o	xo	xxo	xxx						
23	Magdolna Komka	Hungary	1.71	p	p	o	xxx							

Key: WR = world record; o = cleared height; p = passed at height; x = failed jump; NM = no mark; DNS = did not start
