= 1969 European Indoor Games – Women's high jump =

The women's high jump event at the 1969 European Indoor Games was held on 8 March in Belgrade.

== Results ==
Rank	Name	Nationality	Result	Notes
1st place, gold medalist(s)	Rita Schmidt	East Germany	1.82	
2nd place, silver medalist(s)	Yordanka Blagoeva	Bulgaria	1.82	
3rd place, bronze medalist(s)	Antonina Lazareva	Soviet Union	1.79	
4	Valentyna Kozyr	Soviet Union	1.79	
5	Ghislaine Barnay	France	1.79	
6	Mária Faithová	Czechoslovakia	1.76	
7	Danuta Berezowska	Poland	1.76	
8	Breda Babošek	Yugoslavia	1.73	
9	Ilona Gusenbauer	Austria	1.70	
10	Barbara Inkpen	Great Britain	1.70	
11	Magdolna Komka	Hungary	1.70	
12	Liese Prokop	Austria	1.55	
