= 1968 European Indoor Games – Women's high jump =

The women's high jump event at the 1968 European Indoor Games was held on 9 March in Madrid.

== Results ==
| Rank | Name | Nationality | Result | Notes |
|---|---|---|---|---|
| 1st place, gold medalist(s) | Rita Kirst | East Germany | 1.84 | |
| 2nd place, silver medalist(s) | Virginia Bonci | Romania | 1.76 | |
| 3rd place, bronze medalist(s) | Antonina Lazareva | Soviet Union | 1.76 | |
| 4 | Snežana Hrepevnik | Yugoslavia | 1.76 | |
| 5 | Yordanka Blagoeva | Bulgaria | 1.76 | |
| 6 | Klarissa Pushkareva | Soviet Union | 1.73 | |
| 7 | Katya Lazova | Bulgaria | 1.70 | |
| 8 | Barbara Lawton | Great Britain | 1.65 | |
| 9 | Anne Lise Wærness | Norway | 1.65 | |
| 9 | Jaroslava Valentová | Czechoslovakia | 1.65 | |
| 11 | Đurđa Fočić | Yugoslavia | 1.60 | |
| 12 | Ghislaine Barnay | France | 1.60 | |
