= 1972 European Athletics Indoor Championships – Women's high jump =

The women's high jump event at the 1972 European Athletics Indoor Championships was held on 12 March in Grenoble.

== Results ==
Rank	Name	Nationality	1.60	1.65	1.70	1.73	1.76	1.78	1.80	1.82	1.84	1.86	1.86	1.90	Result	Notes
1st place, gold medalist(s)	Rita Schmidt	East Germany	–	–	o	–	o	–	o	o	o	o	xo	o	1.90	WB
2nd place, silver medalist(s)	Rita Gildemeister	East Germany	–	–	o	–	o	o	o	o	o	xxx			1.84	
3rd place, bronze medalist(s)	Yordanka Blagoeva	Bulgaria	–	o	o	–	o	o	o	o	xo	xxx			1.84	
4	Magdolna Komka	Hungary	–	o	o	o	xo	–	o	o	xo	xxx			1.84	
5	Grith Ejstrup	Denmark	–	–	o	o	o	o	xxo	xxx					1.80	
6	Marta Kostlanová	Czechoslovakia	–	o	o	o	xo	xo	xxx						1.78	
7	Alena Prosková	Czechoslovakia	–	o	o	o	o	xxo	xxx						1.78	
8	Monique Horrent	France	–	o	o	o	o	xxx							1.76	
9	Milada Karbanová	France	–	o	xo	o	o	xxx							1.76	
9	Barbara Inkpen	Great Britain	–	o	o	xo	o	xxx							1.76	
11	Valentina Chulkova	Soviet Union	o	o	o	xo	o	xxx							1.76	
12	Solveig Langkilde	Denmark	–	–	xo	o	xxo	xxx							1.76	
13	Beatrix Rechner	Switzerland	–	o	o	xo	xxx								1.73	
