= 1978 European Athletics Championships – Women's high jump =

Women's high jump at the European Athletics Championships

The women's high jump at the 1978 European Athletics Championships was held in Prague, then Czechoslovakia, at Stadion Evžena Rošického on 30 and 31 August 1978.

== Medalists ==
Gold	Sara Simeoni; Italy
Silver	Rosemarie Ackermann; East Germany
Bronze	Brigitte Holzapfel; West Germany

== Results ==
=== Final ===
31 August

Rank	Name	Nationality	Result	Notes
1st place, gold medalist(s)	Sara Simeoni	Italy	2.01	WR=
2nd place, silver medalist(s)	Rosemarie Ackermann	East Germany	1.99	
3rd place, bronze medalist(s)	Brigitte Holzapfel	West Germany	1.95	
4	Jutta Kirst	East Germany	1.93	
5	Ulrike Meyfarth	West Germany	1.91	
6	Andrea Mátay	Hungary	1.85	
7	Snežana Hrepevnik	Yugoslavia	1.85	
8	Urszula Kielan	Poland	1.85	
9	Annette Harnack	West Germany	1.80	
10	Astrid Tveit	Norway	1.80	
11	Kristine Nitzsche	East Germany	1.80	
12	Larisa Klimentenok	Soviet Union	1.80	
13	Mária Mračnová	Czechoslovakia	1.80	
14	Milada Karbanová	Czechoslovakia	1.80	

=== Qualification ===
30 August

Rank	Name	Nationality	Result	Notes
	Milada Karbanová	Czechoslovakia	1.85	Q
	Rosemarie Ackermann	East Germany	1.85	Q
	Jutta Kirst	East Germany	1.85	Q
	Brigitte Holzapfel	West Germany	1.85	Q
	Ulrike Meyfarth	West Germany	1.85	Q
	Annette Harnack	West Germany	1.85	Q
	Snežana Hrepevnik	Yugoslavia	1.85	Q
	Kristine Nitzsche	East Germany	1.85	Q
	Larisa Klimentenok	Soviet Union	1.85	Q
	Sara Simeoni	Italy	1.85	Q
	Urszula Kielan	Poland	1.85	Q
	Mária Mračnová	Czechoslovakia	1.83	q
	Andrea Mátay	Hungary	1.83	q
	Astrid Tveit	Norway	1.83	q
	Annette Tånnander	Sweden	1.80	
	Grith Ejstrup	Denmark	1.80	
	Mirjam van Laar	Netherlands	1.75	
	Marta Rehorovská	Czechoslovakia	1.75	
	Danuta Bułkowska	Poland	1.75	
	Gilian Hitchen	Great Britain	1.75	
	Cornelia Popa	Romania	1.75	
	Anne-Maria Pira	Belgium	1.70	
	Sandra Dini	Italy	1.70	

== Participation ==
According to an unofficial count, 23 athletes from 15 countries participated in the event.

- Belgium (1)
- Czechoslovakia (3)
- Denmark (1)
- East Germany (3)
- Hungary (1)
- Italy (2)
- Netherlands (1)
- Norway (1)
- Poland (2)
- Romania (1)
- Soviet Union (1)
- Sweden (1)
- Great Britain (1)
- West Germany (3)
- Yugoslavia (1)
