= 1970 European Athletics Indoor Championships – Women's high jump =

The women's high jump event at the 1970 European Athletics Indoor Championships was held on 15 March in Vienna.

== Results ==
Rank	Name	Nationality	Result	Notes
1st place, gold medalist(s)	Ilona Gusenbauer	Austria	1.88	WB
2nd place, silver medalist(s)	Cornelia Popescu	Romania	1.82	
3rd place, bronze medalist(s)	Rita Schmidt	East Germany	1.82	
4	Yordanka Blagoeva	Bulgaria	1.82	
5	Snežana Hrepevnik	Yugoslavia	1.76	
6	Danuta Berezowska	Poland	1.76	
7	Magdolna Komka	Hungary	1.73	
8	Nina Brintseva	Soviet Union	1.73	
9	Danuta Konowska	Poland	1.73	
10	Kari Karlsen	Norway	1.73	
11	Maria Zielińska	Poland	1.73	
12	Ghislaine Barnay	France	1.70	
13	Renate Gärtner	West Germany	1.65	
