= 1973 European Athletics Indoor Championships – Women's high jump =

The women's high jump event at the 1973 European Athletics Indoor Championships was held on 11 March in Rotterdam.

== Results ==
Rank	Name	Nationality	Result	Notes
1st place, gold medalist(s)	Yordanka Blagoeva	Bulgaria	1.92	WB
2nd place, silver medalist(s)	Rita Gildemeister	East Germany	1.86	
3rd place, bronze medalist(s)	Milada Karbanová	Czechoslovakia	1.86	
4	Rosemarie Witschas	East Germany	1.86	
5	Andrea Mátay	Hungary	1.84	
6	Miloslava Hübnerová	Czechoslovakia	1.84	
7	Ilona Gusenbauer	Austria	1.84	
8	Erika Rudolf	Hungary	1.82	
9	Sara Simeoni	Italy	1.82	
10	Snežana Hrepevnik	Yugoslavia	1.80	
11	Ria Ahlers	Netherlands	1.80	
12	Annemieke Bouma	Netherlands	1.80	
13	Mieke van Doorn	Netherlands	1.78	
14	Brigitte Göhrs	West Germany	1.78	
15	Grith Ejstrup	Denmark	1.76	
16	Gloris Borfiga	France	1.73	
17	Mary Peters	Great Britain	1.70	
