= Athletics at the 1976 Summer Olympics – Women's high jump =

Women's high jump at the Games of the XXI Olympiad
- Venue: Olympic Stadium
- Date: 26-28 July 1976
- Competitors: 35 from 24 nations
- Winning height: 1.93

Medalists
1st place, gold medalist(s)		Rosemarie Ackermann; East Germany
2nd place, silver medalist(s)		Sara Simeoni; Italy
3rd place, bronze medalist(s)		Yordanka Blagoeva; Bulgaria

The Women's high jump competition at the 1976 Summer Olympics in Montreal was held on 26–28 July.

== Results ==
=== Qualification ===
The qualification was set to 1.80 metres. A total of 21 athletes achieved this height.

Rank	Group	Name	Nationality	1.70	1.75	1.78	1.80	Result	Note
1	A	Brigitte Holzapfel	West Germany	–	–	o	o	1.80	Q
2	A	Galina Filatova	Soviet Union	–	o	o	o	1.80	Q
2	A	Joni Huntley	United States	o	o	–	o	1.80	Q
4	A	Marie-Christine Debourse	France	o	o	o	o	1.80	Q
4	A	Anne-Marie Pira	Belgium	o	o	o	o	1.80	Q
4	A	Ria Ahlers	Netherlands	o	o	o	o	1.80	Q
4	A	Tatyana Shlyakhto	Soviet Union	o	o	o	o	1.80	Q
4	A	Sara Simeoni	Italy	o	o	o	o	1.80	Q
4	A	Yordanka Blagoeva	Bulgaria	o	o	o	o	1.80	Q
4	B	Snežana Hrepevnik	Yugoslavia	o	o	o	o	1.80	Q
4	B	Julie White	Canada	o	o	o	o	1.80	Q
4	A	Andrea Mátay	Hungary	o	o	o	o	1.80	Q
13	A	Cornelia Popa	Romania	o	xo	o	o	1.80	Q
14	B	Louise Hanna-Walker	Canada	o	xxo	o	o	1.80	Q
15	A	Rosemarie Ackermann	East Germany	–	o	o	xo	1.80	Q
16	A	Mária Mračnová	Czechoslovakia	o	o	o	xo	1.80	Q
16	B	Audrey Reid	Jamaica	o	o	o	xo	1.80	Q
18	A	Milada Karbanová	Czechoslovakia	o	o	xo	xo	1.80	Q
18	B	Susann Sundqvist	Finland	o	xo	o	xo	1.80	Q
18	B	Annette Tånnander	Sweden	o	xo	o	xo	1.80	Q
21	B	Paula Girven	United States	o	o	xxo	xo	1.80	Q
22	A	Ulrike Meyfarth	West Germany	xo	o	o	xxx	1.78	
22	A	Rita Kirst	East Germany	xo	o	o	xxx	1.78	
24	B	Donatella Bulfoni	Italy	o	o	xxx		1.75	
25	A	Věra Bradáčová	Czechoslovakia	o	xxo	xxx		1.75	
25	B	Maria Luísa Betioli	Brazil	o	xxo	xxx		1.75	
27	A	Nadezhda Marinenko	Soviet Union	o	xxx			1.70	
27	B	Pam Spencer	United States	o	xxx			1.70	
27	B	Mikiko Sone	Japan	o	xxx			1.70	
27	B	Astrid Tveit	Norway	o	xxx			1.70	
31	B	Moira Walls	Great Britain	xo	xxx			1.70	
	A	Debbie Brill	Canada	–	xxx			NM	
	B	Denise Brown	Great Britain	xxx				NM	
	B	Disa Gísladóttir	Iceland	xxx				NM	
	B	Giuseppina Grassi	San Marino	xxx				NM	

=== Final ===
Rank	Name	Nationality	1.70	1.75	1.78	1.81	1.84	1.87	1.89	1.91	1.93	1.97	Result	Notes
1st place, gold medalist(s)	Rosemarie Ackermann	East Germany	–	o	–	o	o	o	xo	o	xo	xxx	1.93	OR
2nd place, silver medalist(s)	Sara Simeoni	Italy	–	o	o	o	o	o	o	o	xxx		1.91	
3rd place, bronze medalist(s)	Yordanka Blagoeva	Bulgaria	–	–	o	o	o	o	o	xo	xxx		1.91	
4	Mária Mračnová	Czechoslovakia	–	o	–	o	o	o	o	xxx			1.89	
5	Joni Huntley	United States	–	xo	o	xxo	o	o	xo	xxx			1.89	
6	Tatyana Shlyahto	Soviet Union	o	o	o	o	o	o	xxx				1.87	
7	Annette Tånnander	Sweden	o	o	o	o	o	xo	xxx				1.87	
8	Cornelia Popa	Romania	–	–	o	o	o	xxo	xxx				1.87	
9	Andrea Mátay	Hungary	–	o	o	o	o	xxo	xxx				1.87	
10	Julie White	Canada	o	xo	o	o	o	xxo	xxx				1.87	
11	Brigitte Holzapfel	West Germany	–	–	–	xxo	o	xxo	xxx				1.87	
12	Galina Filatova	Soviet Union	–	o	xo	o	o	xxx					1.84	
12	Snežana Hrepevnik	Yugoslavia	–	o	o	xo	o	xxx					1.84	
12	Ria Ahlers	Netherlands	–	o	o	xo	o	xxx					1.84	
15	Susann Sundkvist	Finland	–	o	–	o	xo	xxx					1.84	
15	Marie-Christine Debourse	France	–	o	–	o	xo	xxx					1.84	
17	Anne-Marie Pira	Belgium	–	o	o	o	xo	xxx					1.84	
18	Paula Girven	United States	o	o	–	xxo	xxo	xxx					1.84	
19	Milada Karbanová	Czechoslovakia	–	o	xo	xxo	xxx						1.81	
20	Louise Hanna-Walker	Canada	o	o	xo	xxx							1.78	
21	Audrey Reid	Jamaica	o	xo	xo	xxx							1.78	
