= 1971 European Athletics Indoor Championships – Women's high jump =

The women's high jump event at the 1971 European Athletics Indoor Championships was held on 14 March in Sofia.

== Results ==
Rank	Name	Nationality	1.60	1.65	1.70	1.73	1.76	1.78	1.80	1.82	Result	Notes
1st place, gold medalist(s)	Milada Karbanová	Czechoslovakia	–	o	o	o	o	o	o	xxx	1.80	
2nd place, silver medalist(s)	Vera Gavrilova	Soviet Union	–	o	o	xo	o	xo	xo	xxx	1.80	
3rd place, bronze medalist(s)	Cornelia Popescu	Romania	–	–	o	o	o	o	xxx		1.78	
4	Marta Kostlanová	Czechoslovakia	–	o	o	o	o	xo	xxx		1.78	
5	Snežana Hrepevnik	Yugoslavia	–	–	–	o	o	–	xxx		1.76	
6	Beatrix Rechner	Switzerland	–	–	o	–	o	xxx			1.76	
7	Alena Prosková	Czechoslovakia									1.76	
8	Erika Rudolf	Hungary									1.76	
9	Magdolna Komka	Hungary									1.76	
10	Rita Schmidt	East Germany									1.76	
11	Antonina Lazareva	Soviet Union									1.70	
12	Grith Ejstrup	Denmark									1.65	
13	Anita Meyer	Netherlands									1.60	
