= Athletics at the 1968 Summer Olympics – Women's high jump =

Women's high jump at the Games of the XIX Olympiad
- Venue: Estadio Olímpico Universitario
- Date: October 16-17
- Competitors: 24 from 14 nations
- Winning height: 1.82

Medalists
1st place, gold medalist(s)		Miloslava Rezková; Czechoslovakia
2nd place, silver medalist(s)		Antonina Lazareva; Soviet Union
3rd place, bronze medalist(s)		Valentyna Kozyr; Soviet Union

The Women's high jump competition at the 1968 Summer Olympics in Mexico City was held on 16–17 October.

== Results ==
=== Qualifying ===
Rank	Name	Nationality	Mark	Notes
1	Jaroslava Valentová	Czechoslovakia	1.74	Q
2	Ilona Gusenbauer	Austria	1.74	Q
2	Karin Schulze	East Germany	1.74	Q
2	Rita Schmidt-Kirst	East Germany	1.74	Q
5	Valentyna Kozyr	Soviet Union	1.74	Q
6	Mária Faithová	Czechoslovakia	1.74	Q
7	Barbara Inkpen	Great Britain	1.74	Q
8	Antonina Okorokova-Lazareva	Soviet Union	1.74	Q
9	Maria Cipriano	Brazil	1.74	Q
9	Miloslava Rezková	Czechoslovakia	1.74	Q
9	Vera Grushkina	Soviet Union	1.74	Q
12	Ghislaine Barnay	France	1.74	Q
13	Magdolna Komka	Hungary	1.74	Q
13	Snežana Hrepevnik	Yugoslavia	1.74	Q
15	Audrey Reid	Jamaica	1.71	
16	Nicole Denise	France	1.68	
17	Yordanka Blagoeva	Bulgaria	1.68	
18	Katya Lazova	Bulgaria	1.68	
19	Eleanor Montgomery	United States	1.68	
20	Dorothy Shirley	Great Britain	1.68	
21	Virginia Bonci	Romania	1.65	
22	Sharon Callahan	United States	1.60	
23	Anne Lise Wærness	Norway	1.60	
	Estelle Baskerville	United States	NM	
	Patsy Callender	Barbados	DNS	
	Sandra Johnson	Costa Rica	DNS	
	Lolita Lagrosas	Philippines	DNS	

=== Final ===
Rank	Athlete	Best mark	1.60	1.65	1.68	1.71	1.74	1.76	1.78	1.80	1.82	1.84
1st place, gold medalist(s)	Miloslava Rezková (TCH)	1.82 m	-	o	-	xo	xo	xo	o	o	xxo	xxx
2nd place, silver medalist(s)	Antonina Lazareva (URS)	1.80 m	-	-	o	-	o	-	xo	o	xxx	
3rd place, bronze medalist(s)	Valentyna Kozyr (URS)	1.80 m	-	o	o	o	o	o	xo	xxo	xxx	
4	Jaroslava Valentová (TCH)	1.78 m	-	o	-	o	-	xo	o	xxx		
5	Rita Kirst (GDR)	1.78 m	-	o	-	o	xxo	o	xo	xxx		
6	Mária Faithová (TCH)	1.78 m	-	xo	-	o	xo	o	xxo	xxx		
7	Karin Schulze (GDR)	1.76 m	-	o	-	xo	o	o	xxx			
8	Ilona Gusenbauer (AUT)	1.76 m	-	-	o	xo	o	xo	xxx			
9	Ghislaine Barnay (FRA)	1.71 m	-	o	o	o	xxx					
9	Magdolna Komka (HUN)	1.71 m	-	o	o	o	xxx					
11	Maria Cipriano (BRA)	1.71 m	o	o	o	xxo	xxx					
12	Vera Grushkina (URS)	1.71 m	-	o	xo	xxo	xxx					
13	Barbara Inkpen (GBR)	1.68 m	-	o	o	xxx						
14	Snežana Hrepevnik (YUG)	1.68 m	-	xo	xo	xxx						
