= 1976 European Athletics Indoor Championships – Women's high jump =

The women's high jump event at the 1976 European Athletics Indoor Championships was held on 21 February in Munich.

== Results ==
Rank	Name	Nationality	1.75	1.80	1.83	1.86	1.89	1.92	1.95	Result	Notes
1st place, gold medalist(s)	Rosemarie Ackermann	East Germany					xo	o	xxx	1.92	=CR
2nd place, silver medalist(s)	Ulrike Meyfarth	West Germany					o	xxx		1.89	
3rd place, bronze medalist(s)	Milada Karbanová	Czechoslovakia					xo	xxx		1.89	
4	Marie-Christine Debourse	France								1.86	
5	Věra Bradáčová	Czechoslovakia								1.86	
6	Ria Ahlers	Netherlands			xxo	o	xxx			1.86	NR
7	Mária Mračnová	Czechoslovakia								1.86	
8	Rita Kirst	East Germany								1.83	
9	Marlis Wilken	West Germany								1.83	
10	Brigitte Holzapfel	West Germany								1.80	
11	Mirjam van Laar	Netherlands	o	o	xxx					1.80	
11	Yordanka Blagoeva	Bulgaria								1.80	
11	Nadezhda Oskolok	Soviet Union								1.80	
14	Tatyana Shlyakhto	Soviet Union								1.80	
14	Ann-Ewa Karlsson	Sweden								1.80	
16	Carina Andersson	Sweden								1.75	
17	Annemieke Bouma	Netherlands	xxo	xxx						1.75	
