= 1978 European Athletics Indoor Championships – Women's high jump =

The women's high jump event at the 1978 European Athletics Indoor Championships was held on 11 March in Milan.

== Results ==
Rank	Name	Nationality	Result	Notes
1st place, gold medalist(s)	Sara Simeoni	Italy	1.94	CR
2nd place, silver medalist(s)	Brigitte Holzapfel	West Germany	1.91	
3rd place, bronze medalist(s)	Urszula Kielan	Poland	1.88	
4	Andrea Mátay	Hungary	1.88	
5	Mirjam van Laar	Netherlands	1.88	NR
6	Milada Karbanová	Czechoslovakia	1.88	
7	Nadezhda Marinenko	Soviet Union	1.88	
8	Annette Harnack	West Germany	1.85	
9	Jutta Kirst	East Germany	1.85	
10	Ria van Steenpaal	Netherlands	1.85	
11	Susann Sundkvist	Finland	1.85	
12	Marina Serkova	Soviet Union	1.85	
13	Lidija Benedetič	Yugoslavia	1.80	
13	Gabriele Hahn	West Germany	1.80	
15	Astrid Tveit	Norway	1.80	
16	Marta Jeseňáková	Czechoslovakia	1.75	
