= 1967 European Indoor Games – Women's high jump =

The women's high jump event at the 1967 European Indoor Games was held on 11 and 12 March in Prague.

== Medalists ==
Gold	Silver	Bronze
Taisiya Chenchik; Soviet Union	Linda Knowles; Great Britain	Jaroslava Kralová; Czechoslovakia

== Results ==
=== Qualification ===
Rank	Name	Nationality	Result	Notes
1	Yordanka Blagoeva	Bulgaria	1.68	q
1	Taisiya Chenchik	Soviet Union	1.68	q
1	Rita Gildemeister	East Germany	1.68	q
1	Snežana Hrepevnik	Yugoslavia	1.68	q
1	Linda Knowles	Great Britain	1.68	q
1	Jaroslava Kralová	Czechoslovakia	1.68	q
1	Dagmar Melzer	East Germany	1.68	q
1	Alena Prosková	Czechoslovakia	1.68	q
9	Valentina Kozyr	Soviet Union	1.65	
10	Erika Stoenescu	Romania	1.60	
10	Marjan Thomas	Netherlands	1.60	

=== Final ===
Rank	Name	Nationality	1.55	1.60	1.65	1.70	1.73	1.76	1.78	Result	Notes
1st place, gold medalist(s)	Taisiya Chenchik	Soviet Union	–	o	o	o	xo	o	xxx	1.76	
2nd place, silver medalist(s)	Linda Knowles	Great Britain	o	o	o	xxo	xo	xxx		1.73	
3rd place, bronze medalist(s)	Jaroslava Kralová	Czechoslovakia	–	o	xo	o	xxx			1.70	
4	Rita Gildemeister	East Germany	o	o	xo	o	xxx			1.70	
4	Dagmar Melzer	East Germany	o	xo	o	o	xxx			1.70	
6	Snežana Hrepevnik	Yugoslavia	o	o	o	xxo	xxx			1.70	
7	Alena Prosková	Czechoslovakia	–	o	o	xxx				1.65	
7	Yordanka Blagoeva	Bulgaria	–	o	o	xxx				1.65	
