= Athletics at the 1970 Summer Universiade – Women's high jump =

The women's high jump event at the 1970 Summer Universiade was held at the Stadio Comunale in Turin on 5 September 1970.

== Results ==
Rank	Name	Nationality	Result	Notes
1st place, gold medalist(s)	Snežana Hrepevnik	Yugoslavia	1.86	NR
2nd place, silver medalist(s)	Cornelia Popescu	Romania	1.83	
3rd place, bronze medalist(s)	Ilona Gusenbauer	Austria	1.83	
4	Antonina Lazareva	Soviet Union	1.83	
5	Anna Gertig	Soviet Union	1.77	
6	Katya Lazova	Bulgaria	1.71	
7	Marjeta Pronjari	Albania	1.71	
8	Breda Babošek	Yugoslavia	1.65	
9	Jennifer Wall	Great Britain	1.65	
10	Annalisa Lanci	Italy	1.55	
10	Gloria Iweka	Nigeria	1.55	
12	Linda Knowles	Great Britain	1.55	
