= 1974 European Athletics Indoor Championships – Women's high jump =

The women's high jump event at the 1974 European Athletics Indoor Championships was held on 10 March in Gothenburg.

== Results ==
Rank	Name	Nationality	Result	Notes
1st place, gold medalist(s)	Rosemarie Witschas	East Germany	1.90	
2nd place, silver medalist(s)	Milada Karbanová	Czechoslovakia	1.88	
3rd place, bronze medalist(s)	Rita Kirst	East Germany	1.88	
4	Cornelia Popescu	Romania	1.86	
5	Tamara Galka	Soviet Union	1.86	
6	Ellen Mundinger	West Germany	1.83	
7	Ria Ahlers	Netherlands	1.83	PB
8	Ann-Ewa Karlsson	Sweden	1.80	
9	Grith Ejstrup	Denmark	1.80	
10	Virginia Ioan	Romania	1.80	
11	Mirjam van Laar	Netherlands	1.75	
11	Sara Simeoni	Italy	1.75	
13	Kari Hedenstad	Norway	1.75	
14	Annemieke Bouma	Netherlands	1.70	
