= 1977 European Athletics Indoor Championships – Women's high jump =

The women's high jump event at the 1977 European Athletics Indoor Championships was held on 12 March in San Sebastián.

== Results ==
Rank	Name	Nationality	1.60	1.70	1.75	1.80	1.83	1.86	1.89	1.92	1.96	Result	Notes
1st place, gold medalist(s)	Sara Simeoni	Italy	–	o	o	o	o	xo	xxo	xo	xxx	1.92	
2nd place, silver medalist(s)	Brigitte Holzapfel	West Germany	–	–	o	o	o	o	o	xxx		1.89	
3rd place, bronze medalist(s)	Edit Sámuel	Hungary	–	o	o	o	o	o	xxx			1.86	
4	Andrea Mátay	Hungary	–	–	o	o	o	xo	xxx			1.86	
5	Erika Rudolf	Hungary	–	o	o	o	o	xxx				1.83	
6	Yordanka Blagoeva	Bulgaria	–	o	o	o	xo	xxx				1.83	
7	Sabine Fenske	West Germany	–	o	o	o	xxx					1.80	
8	Snežana Hrepevnik	Yugoslavia	–	o	o	o	xxx					1.80	
9	Rosemarie Ackermann	East Germany	–	–	xo	o	xx–					1.80	
10	Susann Sundkvist	Finland	–	–	o	xo	xxx					1.80	
11	Sylvie Prenveille	France	o	o	xxo	xxo	xxx					1.80	
12	Isabel Mozún	Spain	o	xo	o	xxx						1.75	
13	Elżbieta Krawczuk	Poland	–	o	xo	xxx						1.75	
