= Women's high jump world record progression =

Changes in world records over time

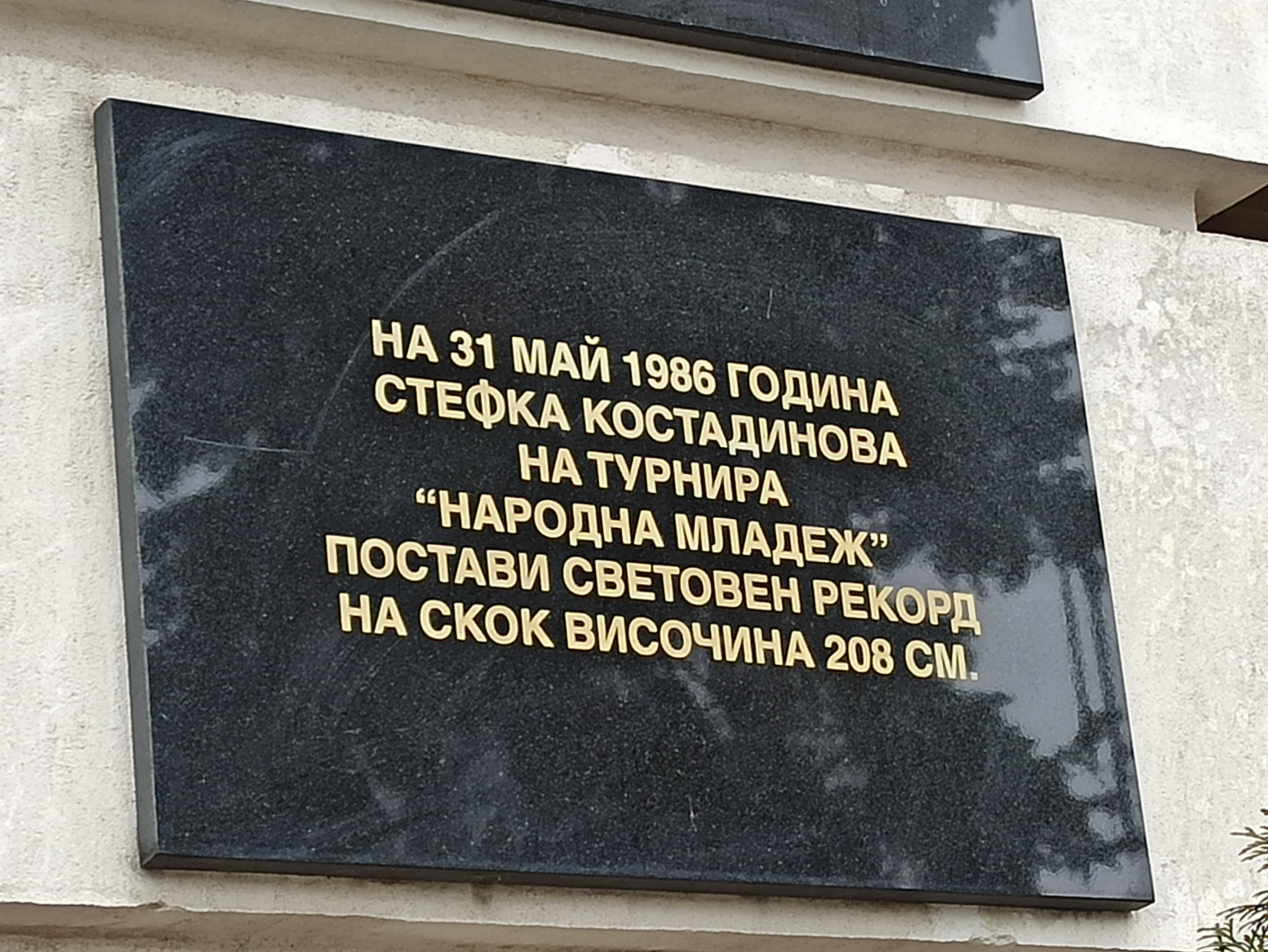
A plaque on Vasil Levski National Stadium, Sofia, Bulgaria, commemorating Stefka Kostadinova's high jump world record of 2.08 m set on 31 May 1986

The first world record in the women's high jump was recognised by the Fédération Sportive Féminine Internationale (FSFI) in 1922. In 1936, the FSFI was absorbed by the International Association of Athletics Federations, now known as World Athletics. As of June 21, 2009, the IAAF (and the FSFI before it) has ratified 56 world records in the event.

== Record progression ==
=== Indoor ===
An asterisk indicates a record was repeated. All records since Kostadinova's 2.04 m in 1987 were ratified by the IAAF.

Women's high jump indoor world record progression
Mark	Athlete	Date	Venue
1.482 m (4 ft 10 1/4 in)	Eleanor Egg (USA)	13 February 1926	Newark
1.517 m (4 ft 11 1/2 in)	Mildred Wiley (USA)	16 February 1928	Boston
1.524 m (5 ft 0 in)	Mildred Wiley (USA)	10 March 1928	Boston
1.603 m (5 ft 3 in)	Jean Shiley (USA)	30 March 1929	Boston
1.613 m (5 ft 3 1/2 in)	Jean Shiley (USA)	19 April 1930	Boston
1.63 m (5 ft 4 in)	Olga Modrachova (TCH)	27 February 1955	Berlin East
1.651 m (5 ft 5 in)	Thelma Hopkins (GBR)	17 April 1957	Manchester
1.70 m (5 ft 6 3/4 in)	Lyudmila Nabatova (URS)	18 January 1958	Orenburg
1.70 m (5 ft 6 3/4 in)*	Taisiya Chenchik (URS)	21 January 1958	Chelyabinsk
1.755 m (5 ft 9 in)	Taisiya Chenchik (URS)	3 February 1958	Leningrad
1.77 m (5 ft 9 1/2 in)	Iolanda Balas (ROU)	26 February 1961	Berlin East
1.80 m (5 ft 10 3/4 in)	Iolanda Balas (ROU)	18 March 1961	Leningrad
1.83 m (6 ft 0 in)	Iolanda Balas (ROU)	18 March 1961	Leningrad
1.86 m (6 ft 1 in)	Iolanda Balas (ROU)	18 March 1961	Leningrad
1.87 m (6 ft 1 1/2 in)	Ilona Gusenbauer (AUT)	6 February 1970	Vienne
1.88 m (6 ft 2 in)	Ilona Gusenbauer (AUT)	15 March 1970	Vienne
1.88 m (6 ft 2 in)	Rita Schmidt-Kirst (GDR)	30 January 1972	Berlin East
1.89 m (6 ft 2 1/4 in)	Ilona Gusenbauer (AUT)	25 February 1972	Vienne
1.90 m (6 ft 2 3/4 in)	Rita Schmidt-Kirst (GDR)	12 March 1972	Grenoble
1.91 m (6 ft 3 in)	Rosemarie Witschas-Ackermann (GDR)	28 January 1973	Berlin East
1.91 m (6 ft 3 in)*	Yordanka Blagoeva (BUL)	18 February 1973	Sofia
1.92 m (6 ft 3 1/2 in)	Yordanka Blagoeva (BUL)	11 March 1973	Rotterdam
1.92 m (6 ft 3 1/2 in)*	Rita Kirst (GDR)	17 February 1974	Sofia
1.94 m (6 ft 4 1/4 in)	Rosemarie Ackermann (GDR)	9 February 1975	Berlin East
1.95 m (6 ft 4 3/4 in)	Rosemarie Ackermann (GDR)	6 March 1977	Berlin East
1.95 m (6 ft 4 3/4 in)*	Sara Simeoni (ITA)	23 February 1978	Milan
1.95 m (6 ft 4 3/4 in)*	Andrea Matay (HUN)	31 January 1979	Budapest
1.96 m (6 ft 5 in)	Andrea Matay (HUN)	17 February 1979	Budapest
1.98 m (6 ft 5 3/4 in)	Andrea Matay (HUN)	17 February 1979	Budapest
1.99 m (6 ft 6 1/4 in)	Deborah Brill (CAN)	23 January 1982	Edmonton
2.00 m (6 ft 6 1/2 in)	Coleen Sommer (USA)	14 February 1982	Ottawa
2.00 m (6 ft 6 1/2 in)*	Tamara Bykova (URS)	6 March 1983	Budapest
2.02 m (6 ft 7 1/2 in)	Tamara Bykova (URS)	6 March 1983	Budapest
2.03 m (6 ft 7 3/4 in)	Tamara Bykova (URS)	6 March 1983	Budapest
2.04 m (6 ft 8 1/4 in)	Stefka Kostadinova (BUL)	31 January 1987	Genova
2.05 m (6 ft 8 1/2 in)	Stefka Kostadinova (BUL)	8 March 1987	Indianapolis
2.06 m (6 ft 9 in)	Stefka Kostadinova (BUL)	20 February 1988	Pireaus
2.07 m (6 ft 9 1/4 in)	Heike Henkel (GER)	9 February 1992	Karlsruhe
2.08 m (6 ft 9 3/4 in)	Kajsa Bergqvist (SWE)	4 February 2006	Arnstadt

=== Outdoor ===
The event is linked on some of the dates.

Mark	Athlete	Date	Venue
1.46 m (4 ft 9 1/4 in)	Nancy Voorhees (USA)	20 May 1922	Simsbury
1.485 m (4 ft 10 1/4 in)	Elizabeth Stine (USA)	26 May 1923	Englewood, New Jersey
1.485 m (4 ft 10 1/4 in)	Sophie Eliott-Lynn (GBR)	6 August 1923	Brentwood
1.524 m (5 ft 0 in)	Phyllis Green (GBR)	11 July 1925	London
1.552 m (5 ft 1 in)	Phyllis Green (GBR)	2 August 1926	London
1.58 m (5 ft 2 in)	Ethel Catherwood (CAN)	6 September 1926	Regina
1.58 m (5 ft 2 in)	Lien Gisolf (NED)	3 July 1928	Brussels
1.595 m (5 ft 2 3/4 in)	Ethel Catherwood (CAN)	5 August 1928	Amsterdam
1.605 m (5 ft 3 in)	Lien Gisolf (NED)	18 August 1929	Maastricht
1.62 m (5 ft 3 3/4 in)	Lien Gisolf (NED)	12 June 1932	Amsterdam
1.65 m (5 ft 4 3/4 in)	Jean Shiley (USA)	7 August 1932	Los Angeles
1.65 m (5 ft 4 3/4 in)	Mildred Didrikson (USA)	7 August 1932	Los Angeles
1.66 m (5 ft 5 1/4 in)	Dorothy Odam (GBR)	29 May 1939	Brentwood
1.66 m (5 ft 5 1/4 in)	Esther van Heerden (South Africa)	29 March 1941	Stellenbosch
1.66 m (5 ft 5 1/4 in)	Ilsebill Pfenning (SUI)	27 July 1941	Lugano
1.71 m (5 ft 7 1/4 in)	Fanny Blankers-Koen (NED)	30 May 1943	Amsterdam
1.72 m (5 ft 7 1/2 in)	Sheila Lerwill (GBR)	7 July 1951	London
1.73 m (5 ft 8 in)	Aleksandra Chudina (URS)	22 May 1954	Kiev
1.74 m (5 ft 8 1/2 in)	Thelma Hopkins (GBR)	5 May 1956	Belfast
1.75 m (5 ft 8 3/4 in)	Iolanda Balaș (ROM)	14 July 1956	Bucharest
1.76 m (5 ft 9 1/4 in)	Mildred McDaniel (USA)	1 December 1956	Melbourne
1.76 m (5 ft 9 1/4 in)	Iolanda Balaş (ROM)	13 October 1957	Bucharest
1.77 m (5 ft 9 1/2 in)	Zheng Fengrong (CHN)	17 November 1957	Beijing
1.78 m (5 ft 10 in)	Iolanda Balaş (ROM)	7 June 1958	Bucharest
1.80 m (5 ft 10 3/4 in)	Iolanda Balaş (ROM)	22 June 1958	Cluj-Napoca
1.81 m (5 ft 11 1/4 in)	Iolanda Balaş (ROM)	31 July 1958	Poiana Brasov
1.82 m (5 ft 11 1/2 in)	Iolanda Balaş (ROM)	4 October 1958	Bucharest
1.83 m (6 ft 0 in)	Iolanda Balaş (ROM)	18 October 1958	Bucharest
1.84 m (6 ft 1/4 in)	Iolanda Balaş (ROM)	21 September 1959	Bucharest
1.85 m (6 ft 3/4 in)	Iolanda Balaş (ROM)	6 June 1960	Bucharest
1.86 m (6 ft 1 in)	Iolanda Balaş (ROM)	10 July 1960	Bucharest
1.87 m (6 ft 1 1/2 in)	Iolanda Balaş (ROM)	15 April 1961	Bucharest
1.88 m (6 ft 2 in)	Iolanda Balaş (ROM)	18 June 1961	Warsaw
1.90 m (6 ft 2 3/4 in)	Iolanda Balaş (ROM)	8 July 1961	Budapest
1.91 m (6 ft 3 in)	Iolanda Balaş (ROM)	16 July 1961	Sofia
1.92 m (6 ft 3 1/2 in)	Ilona Gusenbauer (AUT)	4 September 1971	Vienna
1.92 m (6 ft 3 1/2 in)	Ulrike Meyfarth (FRG)	4 September 1972	Munich
1.94 m (6 ft 4 1/4 in)	Yordanka Blagoeva (BUL)	24 September 1972	Zagreb
1.94 m (6 ft 4 1/4 in)	Rosemarie Witschas (GDR)	24 August 1974	Berlin
1.95 m (6 ft 4 3/4 in)	Rosemarie Ackermann (GDR)	8 September 1974	Rome
1.96 m (6 ft 5 in)	Rosemarie Ackermann (GDR)	8 May 1976	Dresden
1.96 m (6 ft 5 in)	Rosemarie Ackermann (GDR)	3 July 1977	Dresden
1.97 m (6 ft 5 1/2 in)	Rosemarie Ackermann (GDR)	14 August 1977	Helsinki
1.97 m (6 ft 5 1/2 in)	Rosemarie Ackermann (GDR)	26 August 1977	West Berlin
2.00 m (6 ft 6 1/2 in)	Rosemarie Ackermann (GDR)	26 August 1977	West Berlin
2.01 m (6 ft 7 in)	Sara Simeoni (ITA)	4 August 1978	Brescia
2.01 m (6 ft 7 in)	Sara Simeoni (ITA)	31 August 1978	Prague
2.02 m (6 ft 7 1/2 in)	Ulrike Meyfarth (FRG)	8 September 1982	Athens
2.03 m (6 ft 7 3/4 in)	Ulrike Meyfarth (FRG)	21 August 1983	London
2.03 m (6 ft 7 3/4 in)	Tamara Bykova (URS)	21 August 1983	London
2.04 m (6 ft 8 1/4 in)	Tamara Bykova (URS)	25 August 1983	Pisa
2.05 m (6 ft 8 1/2 in)	Tamara Bykova (URS)	22 June 1984	Kiev
2.07 m (6 ft 9 1/4 in)	Lyudmila Andonova (BUL)	20 July 1984	East Berlin
2.07 m (6 ft 9 1/4 in)	Stefka Kostadinova (BUL)	25 May 1986	Sofia
2.08 m (6 ft 9 3/4 in)	Stefka Kostadinova (BUL)	31 May 1986	Sofia
2.09 m (6 ft 10 1/4 in)	Stefka Kostadinova (BUL)	30 August 1987	Rome
2.10 m (6 ft 10 1/2 in)	Yaroslava Mahuchikh (UKR)	7 July 2024	Paris

== See also ==
- Men's high jump world record progression
- Women's high jump all-time top 25: outdoor, indoor
- Women's high jump Italian record progression
