= Athletics at the 1979 Pan American Games – Women's high jump =

Women's high jump at the 1979 Pan American Games
- Venue: Estadio Sixto Escobar
- Dates: 13 July
- Winning height: 1.93

Medalists
Gold medal	Louise Ritter	United States
Silver medal	Pam Spencer	United States
Bronze medal	Debbie Brill	Canada

The women's high jump competition of the athletics events at the 1979 Pan American Games took place on 13 July at the Estadio Sixto Escobar. The defending Pan American Games champion was Joni Huntley of the United States.

== Records ==
Prior to this competition, the existing world and Pan American Games records were as follows:

World record	Sara Simeoni (ITA)	2.01	Prague, Czechoslovakia	August 31, 1978
Pan American Games record	Joni Huntley (USA)	1.89	Mexico City, Mexico	1975

== Results ==
All heights shown are in meters.

KEY:	WR	World Record	GR	Pan American Record

=== Final ===
Rank	Name	Nationality	Height	Notes
1st place, gold medalist(s)	Louise Ritter	United States	1.93	GR
2nd place, silver medalist(s)	Pam Spencer	United States	1.87	
3rd place, bronze medalist(s)	Debbie Brill	Canada	1.85	
4	Julie White	Canada	1.85	
5	Maria Domingues	Brazil	1.83	
6	Angela Carbonell	Cuba	1.81	
7	Elizabeth Huber	Chile	1.74	
8	Silvia Costa	Cuba	1.74	
9	Liliana Arigoni	Argentina	1.74	
10	Rafaela Flores	Puerto Rico	1.55	
	Ana Hidalgo	Puerto Rico	DNS	
