= Athletics at the 1979 Summer Universiade – Women's high jump =

Women's High Jump event

The women's high jump event at the 1979 Summer Universiade was held at the Estadio Olimpico Universitario in Mexico City on 8 and 9 September 1979.

== Medalists ==
Gold	Silver	Bronze
Andrea Mátay; Hungary	Ulrike Meyfarth; West Germany	Sara Simeoni; Italy

== Results ==
=== Qualification ===
Rank	Group	Athlete	Nationality	Result	Notes
?	?	Beatriz Dias	Brazil	1.80	Q
?	?	Françoise Van Poelvoorde	Belgium	1.80	Q
?	?	Brigitte Reid	Canada	1.80	Q
?	?	Andrea Mátay	Hungary	1.80	Q
?	?	Sara Simeoni	Italy	1.80	Q
?	?	Elżbieta Krawczuk	Poland	1.80	Q
?	?	Niculina Ilie	Romania	1.80	Q
?	?	Marina Serkova	Soviet Union	1.80	Q
?	?	Marina Sysoyeva	Soviet Union	1.80	Q
?	?	Susanne Erb	Switzerland	1.80	Q
?	?	Gaby Meier	Switzerland	1.80	Q
?	?	Pam Spencer	United States	1.80	Q
?	?	Annette Harnack	West Germany	1.80	Q
?	?	Ulrike Meyfarth	West Germany	1.80	Q

=== Final ===
Rank	Athlete	Nationality	1.75	1.80	1.83	1.86	1.88	1.90	1.92	1.94	Result	Notes
1st place, gold medalist(s)	Andrea Mátay	Hungary							xxo	xxo	1.94	
2nd place, silver medalist(s)	Ulrike Meyfarth	West Germany			o	o	o	xo	o	xxx	1.92	
3rd place, bronze medalist(s)	Sara Simeoni	Italy	o	o	–	o	o	o	xo	xxx	1.92	
4	Annette Harnack	West Germany					xxo	o			1.90	PB
5	Elżbieta Krawczuk	Poland									1.90	
6	Pam Spencer	United States									1.86	
7	Marina Serkova	Soviet Union									1.83	
8	Brigitte Reid	Canada									1.83	
9	Marina Sysoyeva	Soviet Union									1.80	
10	Françoise Van Poelvoorde	Belgium									1.75	
11	Gaby Meier	Switzerland									1.75	
12	Beatriz Dias	Brazil									1.75	
13	Niculina Ilie	Romania									1.70	
13	Susanne Erb	Switzerland									1.70	
