= Athletics at the 1977 Summer Universiade – Women's high jump =

The women's high jump event at the 1977 Summer Universiade was held at the Vasil Levski National Stadium in Sofia on 19 and 20 August.

== Medalists ==
Gold	Silver	Bronze
Sara Simeoni; Italy	Debbie Brill; Canada	Tatyana Boyko; Soviet Union

== Results ==
=== Qualification ===
Rank	Group	Athlete	Nationality	Result	Notes
?	?	Danièle Guyonnet	France	1.76	Q
?	?	Zofia Niemczewska	Poland	1.76	Q
?	?	Sara Simeoni	Italy	1.76	Q
?	?	Nadezhda Marinenko	Soviet Union	1.76	Q
?	?	Debbie Brill	Canada	1.76	Q
?	?	Cornelia Poppa	Romania	1.76	Q
?	?	Andrea Mátay	Hungary	1.76	Q
?	?	Anne-Marie Pira	Belgium	1.76	Q
?	?	Tatyana Boyko	Soviet Union	1.76	Q
?	?	Anja Wolf	West Germany	1.73	q
?	?	Zsuzsanna Eger	Hungary	1.73	q
?	?	Ángela Carbonell	Cuba	1.73	q
?	?	Louise Ritter	United States	1.73	q
?	?	Brigitte Reid	Canada	1.73	
?	?	Ho Junxia	China	1.73	
?	?	Tanya Vitanova	Bulgaria	1.73	
17	?	Nadine Marloye	Belgium	1.70	

=== Final ===
Rank	Athlete	Nationality	1.70	1.75	1.78	1.81	1.84	1.86	1.88	1.90	1.92	1.95	Result	Notes
1st place, gold medalist(s)	Sara Simeoni	Italy	o	o	–	o	o	o	o	o	xo	xxx	1.92	
2nd place, silver medalist(s)	Debbie Brill	Canada								xo			1.90	
3rd place, bronze medalist(s)	Tatyana Boyko	Soviet Union											1.86	
4	Andrea Mátay	Hungary											1.84	
5	Nadezhda Marinenko	Soviet Union											1.84	
6	Cornelia Poppa	Romania											1.81	
7	Anne-Marie Pira	Belgium											1.81	
8	Zsuzsanna Eger	Hungary											1.78	
9	Ángela Carbonell	Cuba											1.78	
10	Danièle Guyonnet	France											1.78	
10	Anja Wolf	West Germany											1.78	
12	Zofia Niemczewska	Poland											1.75	
13	Louise Ritter	United States											1.75	
