= Marinenko =

Marinenko is an East Slavic surname. Notable people with the surname include:

- Nadezhda Marinenko (born 1951), Belarusian athlete
- Tatyana Marinenko (1920–1942), Soviet-Belarusian partisan
