= Athletics at the 1978 Commonwealth Games – Women's high jump =

Women's high jump at the Commonwealth Games

The women's high jump event at the 1978 Commonwealth Games was held on 11 August at the Commonwealth Stadium in Edmonton, Alberta, Canada.

== Results ==
| Rank | Name | Nationality | 1.60 | 1.70 | 1.75 | 1.78 | 1.80 | 1.83 | 1.90 | 1.93 | Result | Notes |
|---|---|---|---|---|---|---|---|---|---|---|---|---|
| 1st place, gold medalist(s) | Katrina Gibbs | Australia | | | | | | | xxo | xo | 1.93 | GR |
| 2nd place, silver medalist(s) | Debbie Brill | Canada | | | | | | | | xxx | 1.90 | |
| 3rd place, bronze medalist(s) | Julie White | Canada | | | | | | | | | 1.83 | |
| 4 | Gillian Hitchen | England | | | | | | | | | 1.80 | |
| 5 | Barbara Simmonds | England | | | | | | | | | 1.78 | |
| 6 | Maggie Woods | Canada | | | | | | | | | 1.78 | |
| 7 | Valerie Rutter | England | | | | | | | | | 1.75 | |
| 8 | Wendy Phillips | Northern Ireland | | | | | | | | | 1.70 | |
| 9 | Adventina Mutakyawa | Tanzania | | | | | | | | | 1.60 | |
