= Athletics at the 1981 Summer Universiade – Women's high jump =

The women's high jump event at the 1981 Summer Universiade was held at the Stadionul Naţional in Bucharest on 24 and 26 July 1981.

== Medalists ==
Gold	Silver	Bronze
Sara Simeoni; Italy	Lyudmila Andonova; Bulgaria	Tamara Bykova; Soviet Union

== Results ==
=== Qualification ===
Rank	Group	Athlete	Nationality	Result	Notes
?	?	Niculina Vasile	Romania	1.82	
?	?	Tamara Bykova	Soviet Union	1.82	
?	?	Yelena Popkova	Soviet Union	1.82	
?	?	Elżbieta Krawczuk	Poland	1.82	
?	?	Sara Simeoni	Italy	1.82	
?	?	Donatella Bulfoni	Italy	1.82	
?	?	Andrea Mátay	Hungary	1.82	
?	?	Lyudmila Andonova	Bulgaria	1.82	
?	?	Susanne Helm	East Germany	1.82	
?	?	Christine Delage	France	1.82	
?	?	Yolanda Gibson	United States	1.82	
?	?	Ellen Mundinger	West Germany	1.82	
?	?	Zheng Dazhen	China	1.82	
?	?	Kristien Haine	Belgium	1.78	
?	?	Monica Matei	Romania	1.78	
16	?	Isabel Mozún	Spain	1.74	

=== Final ===
Rank	Athlete	Nationality	Result	Notes
1st place, gold medalist(s)	Sara Simeoni	Italy	1.96	UR
2nd place, silver medalist(s)	Lyudmila Andonova	Bulgaria	1.94	
3rd place, bronze medalist(s)	Tamara Bykova	Soviet Union	1.94	
4	Zheng Dazhen	China	1.91	
5	Yelena Popkova	Soviet Union	1.91	
6	Donatella Bulfoni	Italy	1.91	
7	Niculina Vasile	Romania	1.88	
8	Susanne Helm	East Germany	1.88	
9	Andrea Mátay	Hungary	1.88	
10	Elżbieta Krawczuk	Poland	1.88	
11	Yolanda Gibson	United States	1.80	
12	Ellen Mundinger	West Germany	1.75	
	Christine Delage	France	NM	
