= Bisang =

Bisang is a surname. Notable people with this surname include:

- Bruno Bisang (born 1952), Swiss fashion photographer
- Doris Bisang (born 1951), Swiss athlete
- Robert Eighteen-Bisang (1947–2020), Canadian author and scholar
