= 1982 European Athletics Indoor Championships – Women's high jump =

Women's jumping competition

The women's high jump event at the 1982 European Athletics Indoor Championships was held on 7 March.

== Results ==
Rank	Name	Nationality	Results	Notes
1st place, gold medalist(s)	Ulrike Meyfarth	West Germany	1.99	AR
2nd place, silver medalist(s)	Andrea Bienias	East Germany	1.99	AR
3rd place, bronze medalist(s)	Katalin Sterk	Hungary	1.99	AR
4	Kerstin Dedner	East Germany	1.94	
5	Diana Elliott	Great Britain	1.94	NR
6	Tamara Bykova	Soviet Union	1.91	
7	Andrea Breder	West Germany	1.91	
8	Elżbieta Krawczuk	Poland	1.88	
9	Chris Soetewey	Belgium	1.88	
10	Maryse Éwanjé-Épée	France	1.88	
11	Gaby Meier	Switzerland	1.85	
11	Lyudmila Andonova	Bulgaria	1.85	
13	Anne Heitmann	West Germany	1.85	
14	Sandra Dini	Italy	1.85	
14	Emese Béla	Hungary	1.85	
16	Ann-Marie Cording	Great Britain	1.85	
