= Ángela Carbonell =

Retired Cuban athlete (born 1956)

Personal information
- Born: 2 October 1956

Sport
- Sport: Athletics
- Event: High jump

Ángela Carbonell (born 2 October, 1956) is a retired Cuban athlete who participated primarily in the high jump. She won multiple medals at regional level.

== International competitions ==
Year	Competition	Venue	Position	Event	Notes
Representing Cuba
1973	Central American and Caribbean Championships	Maracaibo, Venezuela	3rd	High jump	1.67 m
1973	Central American and Caribbean Championships	Maracaibo, Venezuela	3rd	Pentathlon	3629 pts
1974	Central American and Caribbean Games	Santo Domingo, Dominican Republic	4th	High jump	1.65 m
1974	Central American and Caribbean Games	Santo Domingo, Dominican Republic	2nd	Pentathlon	3867 pts
1974	Central American and Caribbean Junior Championships (U20)	Maracaibo, Venezuela	2nd	100 m hurdles	14.83 s
1974	Central American and Caribbean Junior Championships (U20)	Maracaibo, Venezuela	1st	High jump	1.72 m
1974	Central American and Caribbean Junior Championships (U20)	Maracaibo, Venezuela	3rd	Long jump	5.61 m
1975	Pan American Games	Mexico City, Mexico	7th	High jump	1.74 m
1977	Central American and Caribbean Championships	Xalapa, Mexico	3rd	High jump	1.75 m
1977	Universiade	Sofia, Bulgaria	9th	High jump	1.78 m
1978	Central American and Caribbean Games	Medellín, Colombia	1st	High jump	1.75 m
1979	Pan American Games	San Juan, Puerto Rico	6th	High jump	1.81 m
1981	Central American and Caribbean Championships	Santo Domingo, Dominican Republic	3rd	High jump	1.75 m
1982	Central American and Caribbean Games	Havana, Cuba	2nd	High jump	1.81 m
