= Sandi Goldsberry =

American high jumper

Personal information
- Nationality: American
- Born: September 13, 1955 (age 70) Pasadena, California, United States

Sport
- Sport: Athletics
- Event: High jump

Sandi Goldsberry (born September 13, 1955) is an American athlete. She competed in the women's high jump at the 1972 Summer Olympics.
