= Roxana Vulescu =

Romanian high jumper

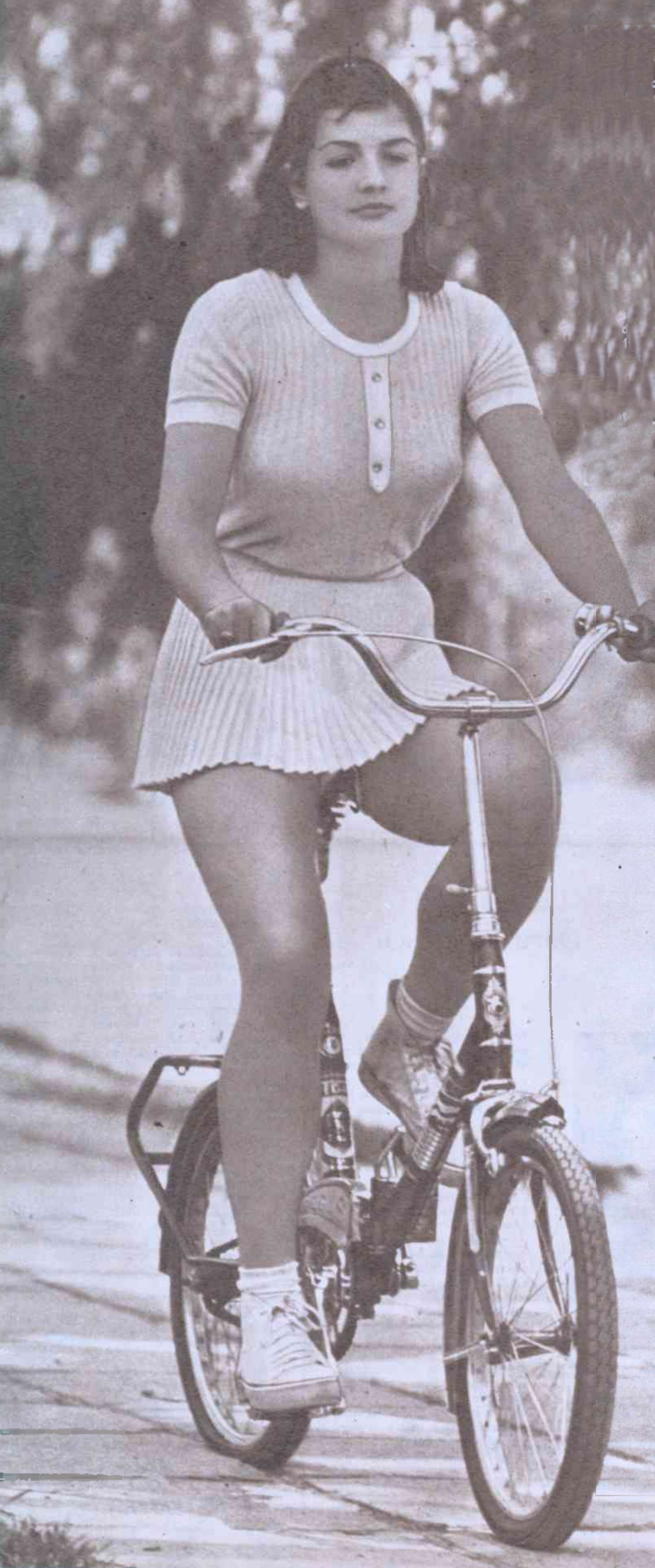
- Roxana Vulescu

Personal information
- Nationality: Romanian
- Born: 31 October 1954 (age 71)

Sport
- Sport: Athletics
- Event: High jump

Roxana Vulescu (born 31 October 1954) is a Romanian athlete. She competed in the women's high jump at the 1972 Summer Olympics.
