= Susann Sundkvist =

Finnish athlete

Personal information
- Nationality: Finnish
- Born: 8 December 1957 (age 68) Larsmo, Finland

Sport
- Country: Finland
- Sport: Athletics
- Event: High jump
- Coached by: Göran Brunell

Achievements and titles
- Personal best: High jump: 1.87 m (1976)
Medal record
European U20 Championships
Silver medal – second place	1975 Athens	High jump

Susann Sundkvist (born 8 December 1957) is a Finnish athlete. She competed in the women's high jump at the 1976 Summer Olympics.

== Biography ==
Sundkvist has won six consecutive Finnish championships in the High jump at the senior level. Her record has been 1.87 m since 1976. Sundkvist has improved the Finnish record six times from 1974 to 1976 (from 1.75 to 1.87 m). At club level she represented Idrottsföreningen Drott and Kokkola Veikko of Pietarsaar. She reached silver in the European Athletics U20 Championships in 1975 in Athens with a measure of 1.86 m. She was coached by Göran Brunell.

Sundkvist is the youngest winner of the Finnish high jump championship. The 1973 championship reached 15 years, 8 months and 2 days. It is also the youngest medal (14 years, 8 months, 4 days).

She won 1976 Italian Athletics Indoor Championships, because in that year some non-Italian athletes were invited to participate in some competitions.

== Achievements ==
Year	Competition	Venue	Position	Event	Performance	Notes
1976	Olympic Games	(Canada) Montreal	15th	High jump	1.84 m	
1977	European Indoor Championships	(Spain) San Sebastián	10th	High jump	1.80 m	
1978	European Indoor Championships	(Italy) Milan	11th	High jump	1.85 m	
