= Athletics at the 1975 Pan American Games – Women's high jump =

Women's high jump at the Pan American Games

The women's high jump event at the 1975 Pan American Games was held in Mexico City on 17 October.

== Results ==
Rank	Name	Nationality	Result	Notes
1st place, gold medalist(s)	Joni Huntley	United States	1.89	
2nd place, silver medalist(s)	Louise Walker	Canada	1.86	
3rd place, bronze medalist(s)	Andrea Bruce	Jamaica	1.83	
4	Debbie Brill	Canada	1.81	
5	Maria Luísa Betioli	Brazil	1.81	
6	Pam Spencer	United States	1.77	
7	Angela Carbonell	Cuba	1.74	
8	Jurema da Silva	Brazil	1.71	
9	Linda Woodside	Bahamas	1.60	
10	Elisa Ávila	Mexico	1.60	
