= Sharon Callahan =

American high jumper

Personal information
- Nationality: American
- Born: March 25, 1952
- Died: April 30, 2015 (aged 63)

Sport
- Sport: Athletics
- Event: High jump

Sharon Callahan (March 25, 1952 – April 30, 2015) was an American athlete. She competed in the women's high jump at the 1968 Summer Olympics.
