= Brigitte Holzapfel =

German high jumper (born 1958)

Medal record

Women's athletics

Representing West Germany

European Championships
Bronze medal – third place	1978 Prague	High jump

European Indoor Championships
Silver medal – second place	1977 San Sebastián	High jump
Silver medal – second place	1978 Milan	High jump

Brigitte Elisabeth Holzapfel (born 10 April 1958 in Krefeld) is a retired West German high jumper.

At the 1975 European Junior Championships she won a bronze medal in the high jump and a gold medal in pentathlon. She finished eleventh at the 1976 Olympic Games, won silver medals at the 1977 and 1978 European Indoor Championships, and the bronze medal at the 1978 European Championships, finished sixth at the 1984 European Indoor Championships and eleventh at the 1984 Olympic Games. She represented the sports clubs TSV Preußen Krefeld, TuS 04 Leverkusen, LG Bayer Leverkusen and TV Wattenscheid, and became West German champion in 1976 and 1978.

Her personal best jump was 1.95 metres, achieved in August 1978 in Köln. This was the West German record.

== International competitions ==
Year	Competition	Venue	Position	Event	Notes
Representing West Germany
1975	European Junior Championships	Athens, Greece	3rd	High jump	1.80 m
1975	European Junior Championships	Athens, Greece	1st	Pentathlon	4450
1976	European Indoor Championships	Munich, Germany	10th	High jump	1.80 m
1976	Olympic Games	Montreal, Canada	11th	High jump	1.87 m
1977	European Indoor Championships	San Sebastián, Spain	2nd	High jump	1.89 m
1978	European Indoor Championships	Milan, Italy	2nd	High jump	1.91 m
1978	European Championships	Prague, Czechoslovakia	3rd	High jump	1.95 m
1982	European Championships	Athens, Greece	13th (q)	High jump	1.85 m
1984	European Indoor Championships	Gothenburg, Sweden	6th	High jump	1.92 m
1984	Olympic Games	Los Angeles, United States	11th	High jump	1.85 m (1.90)
