= Lára Sveinsdóttir =

Icelandic high jumper

Personal information
- Nationality: Icelandic
- Born: 22 August 1955 (age 70)

Sport
- Sport: Athletics
- Event: High jump

Lára Sveinsdóttir (born 22 August 1955) is an Icelandic former athlete. She competed for Ármann was one of the leading female athletes in Iceland during the 1970's when she set several national records in the long jump, high jump, 100 meter run, 100 meter hurdles and pentathlon. She competed in the women's high jump at the 1972 Summer Olympics, becoming first Icelandic woman to compete in athletics at the Olympics and the youngest Icelandic athlete at the 1972 games. The same year, she finished third in voting for the Icelandic Sportsperson of the Year.
