= Penelope Dimmock =

British high jumper

Personal information
- Nationality: British
- Born: 28 December 1954 (age 71)

Sport
- Sport: Athletics
- Event: High jump

Penelope Dimmock (born 28 December 1954) is a British athlete. She competed in the women's high jump at the 1972 Summer Olympics.
