= Dagmar Melzer =

Dagmar Melzer (born 23 June 1945) is a retired East German high jumper.

She won the bronze medal at the 1964 European Junior Games, finished seventh at the 1966 European Championships and joint fourth at the 1967 European Indoor Games.

At the East German championships she won silver medals in 1963 and 1966, and bronze medals in 1967 and 1968. She became East German indoor champion in 1965 and 1967. She competed for the sports club SC DHfK Leipzig during her active career.
