= Mihoko Yama =

Japanese high jumper

Personal information
- Nationality: Japanese
- Born: 7 September 1949 (age 76)

Sport
- Sport: Athletics
- Event: High jump

Mihoko Yama (山 三保子, Yama Mihoko; born 7 September 1949) is a Japanese athlete. She competed in the women's high jump at the 1972 Summer Olympics.
