= Nicole Denise =

French high jumper

Personal information
- Nationality: French
- Born: 11 May 1949 (age 77)

Sport
- Sport: Athletics
- Event: High jump

Nicole Denise (born 11 May 1949) is a French athlete. She competed in the women's high jump at the 1968 Summer Olympics.
