= Wu Yu-chih =

Taiwanese high jumper

Personal information
- Full name: 吳 玉枝, Pinyin: Wú Yù-zhī
- Nationality: Taiwanese
- Born: 2 November 1951 (age 74)

Sport
- Sport: Athletics
- Event: High jump

Wu Yu-chih (born 2 November 1951) is a Taiwanese athlete. She competed in the women's high jump at the 1972 Summer Olympics.
