= Ulrike Meyfarth =

German high jumper

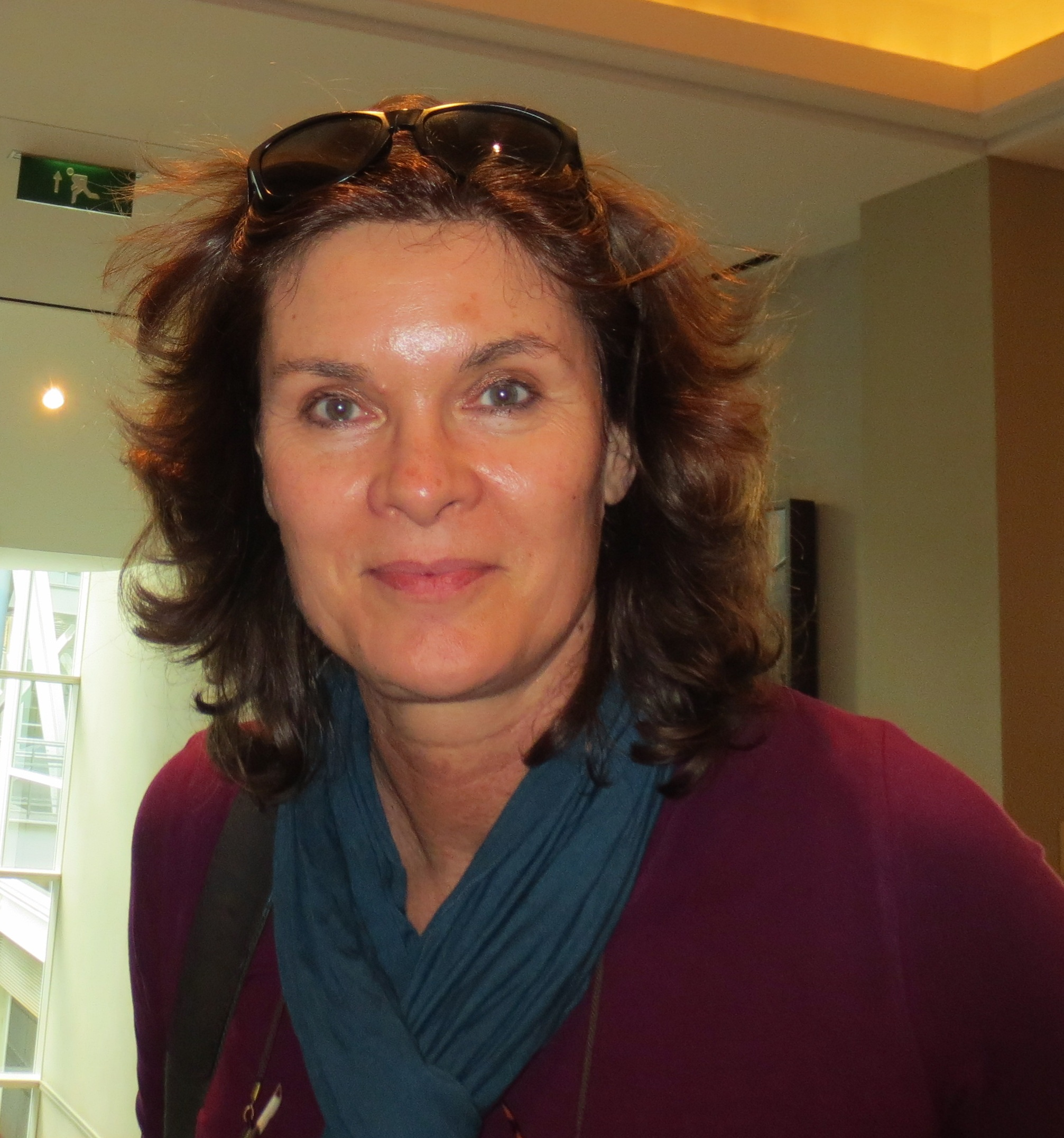
- Meyfarth in 2012

Personal information
- Born: 4 May 1956 (age 70) Frankfurt am Main, West Germany
- Height: 1.88 m (6 ft 2 in)
- Weight: 70 kg (154 lb)

Sport
- Sport: Athletics
- Event: High jump
- Club: LG Rhein-Ville; ASV Köln; Bayer Leverkusen

Achievements and titles
- Personal best: 2.03 m (1983)
Medal record
Women's athletics
Representing West Germany
Olympic Games
Gold medal – first place	1972 Munich	High jump
Gold medal – first place	1984 Los Angeles	High jump
World Championships
Silver medal – second place	1983 Helsinki	High jump
European Championships
Gold medal – first place	1982 Athens	High jump
European Indoor Championships
Gold medal – first place	1982 Milan	High jump
Gold medal – first place	1984 Gothenburg	High jump
Silver medal – second place	1976 Munich	High jump
Bronze medal – third place	1979 Vienna	High jump
Summer Universiade
Silver medal – second place	1979 Mexico City	High jump

Ulrike Nasse-Meyfarth (née Meyfarth German pronunciation: [ʊlˈʁiːkə ˈmaɪfaːɐ̯t]; born 4 May 1956) is a German former high jumper. She won the Olympic title twice, in 1972 and 1984. She is the youngest Olympic champion ever in women's high jump, and at the time of her 1984 triumph, she also was the oldest ever.

== Biography ==
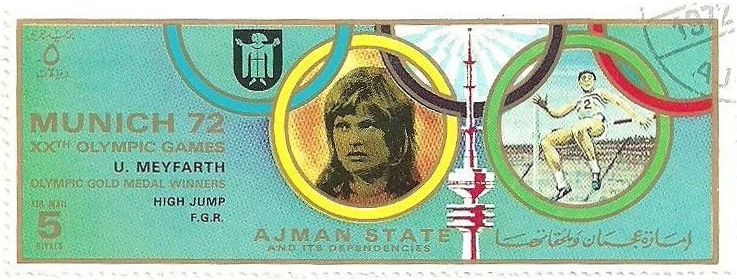
Meyfarth on a stamp of Ajman

The athletic career of Meyfarth took off quickly. In 1971, when she was only fifteen, she already placed second at the West German Championships, and the following year she qualified as the third member of the West German team for the 1972 Summer Olympics that were held in Munich.

Meyfarth was one of the few jumpers who had already adopted the new high jumping style first displayed by Dick Fosbury at the Mexico Olympics four years earlier. Not much was expected from Meyfarth, who had a 1.85-metre personal best. Yet in front of the patriotic home crowd, she rose to the occasion and improved her best by 5 cm to reach 1.90 metres – enough to secure the gold medal. She added another 2 cm to equal the standing world record and became the youngest Olympic champion in athletics in an individual event, at only 16 years old.

Her career stagnated after this surprising victory, and she did not improve on her 1.92-metre mark until 1978. She did not win any titles in the meantime, placing 7th and 5th at the 1974 and 1978 European Championships, and not reaching the final of the high jump competition at the 1976 Montreal Games. Because of the West German boycott of the 1980 Summer Olympics, she did not compete there.

1982 was Meyfarth's comeback year. She won the European championships indoor and outdoor, and set a new world record of 2.02 m on the latter occasion. In 1983, she finished second at the first World Championships, after a close fight with Tamara Bykova, whom she had beaten at the European Championships the year before. At a competition in London, both Bykova and Meyfarth cleared 2.03 m, again a new world record. Bykova added another centimetre to this mark just four days later.

The 1984 Summer Olympics event in Los Angeles was Ulrike Meyfarth's last major championship. Several of her toughest competitors, including Bykova, were absent because most of the East Bloc nations boycotted the Olympics. She defeated the reigning Olympic champion – Italy's Sara Simeoni – and cleared 2.02 meters to win her second Olympic title. This time, Meyfarth was the oldest woman to win the Olympic high jump title.

She started her career in the club LG Rhein-Ville, becoming the West German national silver medalist in 1971 and bronze medalist in 1972. She then moved to ASV Köln and became the West German champion in 1973, 1975, 1979, and 1980–1983. She also took another bronze in 1976 and silvers in 1978 and 1984.

== Personal life ==
In 1983 she posed naked as a model for "The Highjumper", a bronze sculpture by Arno Breker.

In 1987 she married Roland Nasse, a lawyer from Cologne. With him and their two daughters, she lives in Odenthal, a town north of Cologne.

Nasse-Meyfarth studied at the Deutschen Sporthochschule Köln (DSK). She is a diplomated sports teacher and since 1997 a trainer and talent scout at German sports club TSV Bayer 04 Leverkusen (as of 2019).

== International competitions ==
Year	Competition	Venue	Position	Notes
Representing West Germany
1971	European Championships	Helsinki, Finland	30th (q)	1.68 m
1972	Olympic Games	Munich, West Germany	1st	1.92 m
1973	European Junior Championships	Duisburg, West Germany	2nd	1.80 m
1974	European Championships	Rome, Italy	7th	1.83 m
1976	European Indoor Championships	Munich, West Germany	2nd	1.89 m
1976	Olympic Games	Montreal, Canada	22nd (q)	1.78 m
1978	European Championships	Prague, Czechoslovakia	5th	1.91 m
1979	European Indoor Championships	Vienna, Austria	3rd	1.80 m
1979	Universiade	Mexico City, Mexico	2nd	1.92 m
1980	European Indoor Championships	Sindelfingen, West Germany	11th	1.80 m
1981	European Indoor Championships	Grenoble, France	4th	1.88 m
1981	World Cup	Rome, Italy	1st	1.96 m^{1}
1982	European Indoor Championships	Milan, Italy	1st	1.99 m
1982	European Championships	Athens, Greece	1st	2.02 m (WR)
1983	World Championships	Helsinki, Finland	2nd	1.99 m
1984	European Indoor Championships	Gothenburg, Sweden	1st	1.95 m
1984	Olympic Games	Los Angeles, United States	1st	2.02 m (OR)

^{1} Representing Europe

Awards and achievements
Preceded by (Germany) Irene Epple	West German Sportswoman of the Year; 1981–1984	Succeeded by (Germany) Cornelia Hanisch
Records
Preceded by (Austria) Ilona Gusenbauer	Women's High Jump World Record Holder; 4 September 1972 – 24 September 1972	Succeeded by (Bulgaria) Yordanka Blagoeva
Preceded by (Italy) Sara Simeoni	Women's High Jump World Record Holder; 8 September 1982 – 25 August 1983	Succeeded by (Soviet Union) Tamara Bykova
Sporting positions
Preceded by (United States) Pam Spencer	Women's High Jump Best Year Performance; 1982	Succeeded by (Soviet Union) Tamara Bykova
