= Andrea Mátay =

Hungarian high jumper

Personal information
- Born: 27 September 1955 (age 71) Budapest, Hungary

Sport
- Sport: Track and field
Medal record
Representing Hungary
European Indoor Championships
Gold medal – first place	1979 Vienna	High jump
Silver medal – second place	1980 Sindelfingen	High jump
Summer Universiade
Gold medal – first place	1979 Mexico City	High jump

Andrea Mátay (born 27 September 1955) is a retired Hungarian high jumper. Her outdoor personal best jump was 1.94 metres, achieved in September 1979 in Mexico City. She had 1.98 m on the indoor track, from February 1979 in Budapest. It was a world indoor record. She won two medals at the European Indoor Championships. She became Hungarian champion in 1973, 1975, 1977, 1978, 1979 and 1985.

She was named Hungarian Sportswoman of The Year in 1979 after having won the European Indoor Championships and the Summer Universiade the same year.

== International competitions ==
Year	Competition	Venue	Position	Event	Notes
Representing Hungary
1973	European Indoor Championships	Rotterdam, Netherlands	5th	High jump	1.84 m
1973	European Junior Championships	Duisburg, West Germany	4th	High jump	1.78 m
1976	Olympic Games	Montreal, Canada	9th	High jump	1.87 m
1977	European Indoor Championships	San Sebastián, Spain	4th	High jump	1.86 m
1977	Universiade	Sofia, Bulgaria	4th	High jump	1.84 m
1978	European Indoor Championships	Milan, Italy	4th	High jump	1.88 m
1978	European Championships	Prague, Czechoslovakia	6th	High jump	1.85 m
1979	European Indoor Championships	Vienna, Austria	1st	High jump	1.79 m
1979	Universiade	Mexico City, Mexico	1st	High jump	1.94 m
1980	European Indoor Championships	Sindelfingen, West Germany	2nd	High jump	1.93 m
1980	Olympic Games	Moscow, Soviet Union	10th	High jump	1.85 m
1981	Universiade	Bucharest, Romania	9th	High jump	1.88 m
1985	European Indoor Championships	Athens, Greece	6th	High jump	1.85 m
1988	European Indoor Championships	Budapest, Hungary	7th	High jump	1.88 m

Awards
Preceded by Judit Magos	Hungarian Sportswoman of The Year; 1979	Succeeded by Magda Maros
