= Vera Grushkina =

Soviet high jumper

Personal information
- Nationality: Soviet
- Born: 1 May 1947 (age 79)

Sport
- Sport: Athletics
- Event: High jump
Medal record
Women's athletics
Representing Soviet Union
European Indoor Championships
Silver medal – second place	1971 Sofia	High jump

Vera Grushkina (born 1 May 1947) is a Soviet athlete. She competed in the women's high jump at the 1968 Summer Olympics.
