= Rita Gildemeister =

German high jumper

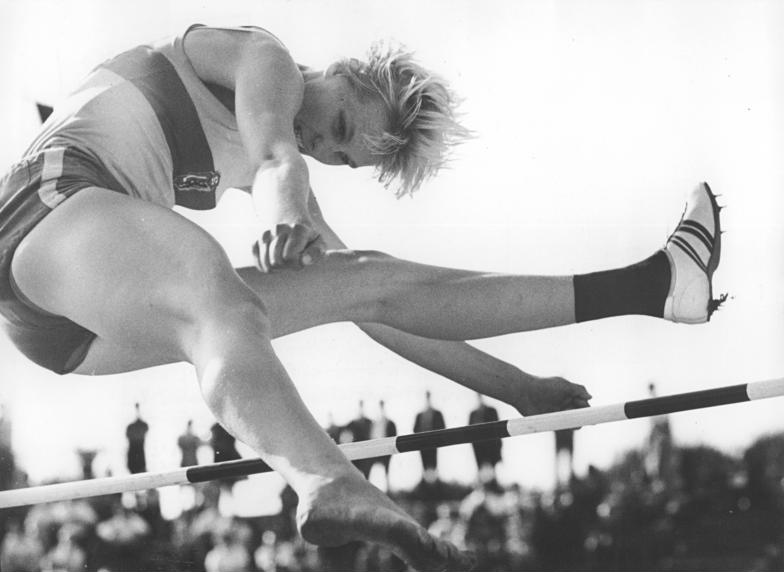
- Rita Gildemeister in 1965

Personal information
- Nationality: German
- Born: 6 March 1947 (age 79) Klueß, Soviet occupation zone in Germany

Sport
- Sport: Athletics
- Event: High jump
Medal record
Women's athletics
Representing East Germany
European Indoor Championships
Silver medal – second place	1972 Grenoble	High jump
Silver medal – second place	1973 Rotterdam	High jump

Rita Gildemeister (born 6 March 1947) is a German athlete. She competed in the women's high jump at the 1972 Summer Olympics, representing East Germany. She became East German champion in 1965, and also won two silver and two bronze between 1967 and 1971. At the East German indoor championships she won four silver medals between 1965 and 1973. She competed for the sports club SC Leipzig.
