= Věra Bradáčová =

Czech high jumper

Personal information
- Nationality: Czech
- Born: 12 October 1955 (age 70) Nový Bor, Czechoslovakia

Sport
- Sport: Athletics
- Event: High jump

Věra Bradáčová (born 12 October 1955) is a Czech athlete. She competed in the women's high jump at the 1976 Summer Olympics.
