= Debbie Brill =

Canadian high jumper (born 1953)

Debbie Brill OC
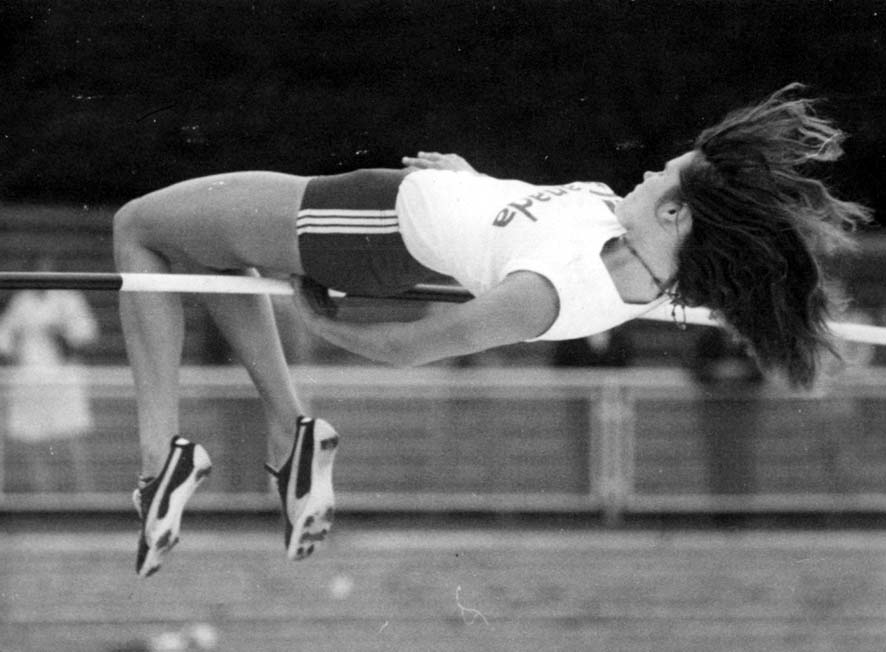
- Brill in 1972

Personal information
- Full name: Debbie Arden Brill
- Born: March 10, 1953 (age 73) Mission, British Columbia, Canada

Sport
- Sport: High jump

Achievements and titles
- Highest world ranking: 1st (1979)
- Personal bests: High jump (indoor): 1.99 m (6 ft 6.3 in) (1982, Former WIR); High jump (outdoor): 1.98 m (6 ft 6.0 in) (1984, NR)
Medal record
Women's athletics
Representing Canada
IAAF World Indoor Games
Bronze medal – third place	1985 Paris	High jump
Pan American Games
Gold medal – first place	1971 Cali	High jump
Bronze medal – third place	1979 San Juan	High jump
Commonwealth Games
Gold medal – first place	1970 Edinburgh	High jump
Silver medal – second place	1978 Edmonton	High jump
Gold medal – first place	1982 Brisbane	High jump
Universiade
Silver medal – second place	1977 Sofia	High jump
Representing Americas
IAAF World Cup
Gold medal – first place	1979 Montreal	High jump
Bronze medal – third place	1977 Dusseldorf	High jump

Debbie Arden Brill (born March 10, 1953) is a Canadian high jump athlete who at the age of 16 became the first North American woman to clear 6 feet. Her reverse jumping style—which is now almost exclusively the technique of elite high jumpers—was called the Brill Bend and was developed by her when she was a child, around the same time as Dick Fosbury was developing the similar Fosbury Flop in the US. Brill won gold in the high jump at the 1970 Commonwealth Games, and at the Pan American Games in 1971. She finished 8th in the 1972 Summer Olympics, then quit the sport in the wake of the Munich massacre, returning three years later. She won gold at the IAAF World Cup in 1979 and at the 1982 Commonwealth Games. She has held the Canadian high jump record since 1969, and set the current record of 1.99 metres in 1982, a few months after giving birth to her first child.

== Career ==
Brill was born in Mission, British Columbia, one of five children of a Canadian father and an American mother. She developed her style of jumping as a preteen on the family farm when her father made a landing pit containing foam rubber. Fifty years later she described it as "a natural extension of what my body was telling me to do. It was physical intuition; it wasn't anything taught." The technique, which involved jumping over the bar with her face to the sky and landing on her back, was dubbed the "Brill bend". Her clubmates thought it was unique until they learned that an older American athlete, Dick Fosbury, was becoming known for using the same technique.

Brill started competing provincially in British Columbia in 1966 at age 13. The following year, she competed at the Canadian national level. Her first international competition was in 1968 at age 15. In 1970 at age 17, she became the first woman in the western hemisphere to jump 6 ft (1.83 m).

Brill has held the Canadian National High Jump record since 1969, establishing her first Canadian High Jump record when she was 16. She set her final Canadian outdoor record in September 1984 with 1.98 metres (6 ft 6 in). Her indoor record of 1.99 metres (6 ft 6 in) was set in 1982. As of 2017, Brill's Canadian records still stand. She won the gold medal at the first Pacific Conference Games in 1969. She would again win the Pacific Conference Games title in 1977.

Brill won the 1970 Commonwealth Games in Edinburgh, Scotland, UK, and was presented with the gold medal by Queen Elizabeth. She won the 1971 Pan Am Games. Brill came in eighth at the 1972 Olympics in Munich. She campaigned to have the Games stopped after the Munich massacre and retired afterwards, becoming disillusioned with the Olympic experience. She returned to competition in 1975 and placed 4th at the Pan Am Games. At the 1976 Montreal Olympics, she was eliminated after failing three times at the opening height and was criticized for laughing in a subsequent interview, although she wrote afterwards that she was disappointed by her failure. She placed 3rd at the first World Cup in 1977, and won a silver medal at home in Edmonton at the 1978 Commonwealth Games. In 1979, Brill won a gold medal in the athletics World Cup held in Montreal, Canada. She was the world's number one high jumper for 1979.

Having been ranked number one in the world by Track and Field News in 1979, Brill was one of the favourites going into the 1980 Olympics which Canada boycotted because of the U.S.S.R.'s military involvement in Afghanistan. In January 1982, Brill established a World Indoor High Jump record of 1.99 meters in Edmonton, Alberta, 5 months after giving birth to her first son Neil. She has a daughter Katelin and another son Jacob. She is married to physician Dr. Douglas Coleman. She was again Commonwealth Champion in 1982 at the games in Brisbane.

From 1970 to 1985 in the annual Track and Field News merit rankings, Brill was ranked in the world's top ten for the high jump twelve times (the exceptions being 1973, 74, 76 and 81; with 76 being the only active year of the four). She was ranked in the top 5 six times. The only female high jumpers with more top ten rankings are Inha Babakova and Stefka Kostadinova, both with thirteen.

In 1983, Brill was made an Officer of the Order of Canada in recognition for being "Canada's premier woman high-jumper". In 2012, she was awarded the Queen Elizabeth II Diamond Jubilee Medal.

In 1999, at the age of 46, Brill broke the world masters record (age 45+) when she cleared 1.76 metres in Gateshead, England. In 2004, she broke the age 50+ masters record by clearing 1.60 m in Langley, British Columbia. As of 2016, Brill's world age group records still stand.

== Achievements ==
=== Records ===
- Canadian National High Jump Record – 1.98 m (1984, has held national record since 1969)
- Canadian National Indoor Record – 1.99 m (1982, former world indoor record)
- World Masters Record (W45+) – 1.76 (1999)
- World Masters Record (W50+) – 1.60 m (2004)

=== National titles ===
- 11 times Canadian National High Jump Champion – 1968-71,1974,1976,1978,1980,1982-1984
- 2 times United States National High Jump Champion – 1979, 1982
- WAAA National (UK) High Jump Champion – 1971

=== International competitions ===
Representing Canada
Year	Competition	Venue	Result	Height
1969	Pacific Conference Games	Tokyo, Japan	1st	1.71 m
1970	British Commonwealth Games	Edinburgh, United Kingdom	1st	1.78 m
1971	Pan American Games	Cali, Colombia	1st	1.85 m
1972	Olympic Games	Munich, West Germany	8th	1.82 m
1975	Pan American Games	Mexico City, Mexico	4th	1.81 m
1976	Olympic Games	Montreal, Quebec, Canada	—	NM
1977	Universiade	Sofia, Bulgaria	2nd	1.90 m
1977	Pacific Conference Games	Canberra, Australia	1st	1.88 m
1977	World Cup	Düsseldorf, Germany	3rd	1.89 m^{1}
1978	Commonwealth Games	Edmonton, Alberta, Canada	2nd	1.90 m
1979	Pan American Games	San Juan, Puerto Rico	3rd	1.85 m
1979	World Cup	Montreal, Quebec, Canada	1st	1.96 m^{1}
1982	Commonwealth Games	Brisbane, Australia	1st	1.88 m
1983	World Championships	Helsinki, Finland	6th	1.88 m
1984	Olympic Games	Los Angeles, United States	5th	1.94 m
1985	World Indoor Games	Paris, France	3rd	1.90 m
1986	Commonwealth Games	Edinburgh, United Kingdom	5th	1.88 m

Note: At the 1976 Olympic Games, Brill had three failures at her opening height of 1.75 m in the qualifying round.

^{1}Representing the Americas.

Sporting positions
Preceded by (United States) Louise Ritter	USA National High Jump Champion; 1979	Succeeded by (United States) Coleen Rienstra
Preceded by (United States) Pam Spencer	USA National High Jump Champion; 1982	Succeeded by (United States) Louise Ritter
