= Julie White (high jumper) =

Canadian high jumper

Personal information
- Born: 1 June 1960 (age 66) Bancroft, Ontario, Canada

Sport
- Sport: Athletics
- Event: High jump
Medal record
Representing Canada
Commonwealth Games
Bronze medal – third place	1978 Edmonton	High jump

Julie Margaret White (born 1 June 1960) is a Canadian athlete. She competed in the women's high jump at the 1976 Summer Olympics.

After high school, where she set the Canadian high school high jump record, she attended Boston University and was inducted into Boston University's athletics hall of fame in 1991.

White was also an accomplished indoor pentathlete for the Boston University Terriers track and field team, winning the 1982 AIAW Indoor Track and Field Championships in that event.
