= Kari Karlsen =

Norwegian high jumper

Personal information
- Nationality: Norwegian
- Born: 5 February 1952 (age 73)
- Height: 178 cm (5 ft 10 in)
- Weight: 63 kg (139 lb)

Sport
- Sport: Athletics
- Event: high jump
- Club: Oslo Idrettslag

Kari Karlsen (born 5 February 1952) is a retired Norwegian high jumper, who was selected for the 1972 Summer Olympics.

== Biography ==
Karlsen represented Oslo IL and finished tenth at the 1970 European Indoor Championships, eleventh at the 1971 European Indoor Championships and thirteenth at the 1974 European Indoor Championships. She became Norwegian champion in the years 1970-1973.

Karlsen finished third behind Debbie Brill in the high jump event at the British 1971 WAAA Championships.

Her personal best jump was 1.80 metres, achieved in July 1971 in London.
