= Tatyana Shlyakhto =

Belarusian high jumper and judge

Personal information
- Nationality: Belarusian
- Born: 24 November 1955 (age 70) Vitebsk, Byelorussian SSR, Soviet Union (now Belarus)

Sport
- Sport: Athletics
- Event: High jump
Medal record
Representing Soviet Union
Summer Universiade
Bronze medal – third place	1977 Sofia	High jump

Tatyana Boyko (née Shlyakhto; born 24 November 1955) is a Belarusian athlete and a judge of the Constitutional Court of Belarus. She competed in the women's high jump at the 1976 Summer Olympics, representing the Soviet Union.

She graduated from the law faculty of the Belarusian State University in 1981 and became a Constitutional Court judge in 1997.

After the 2020 Belarusian protests, she was banned from entering the Baltic states.
