= Karin Schulze =

German high jumper

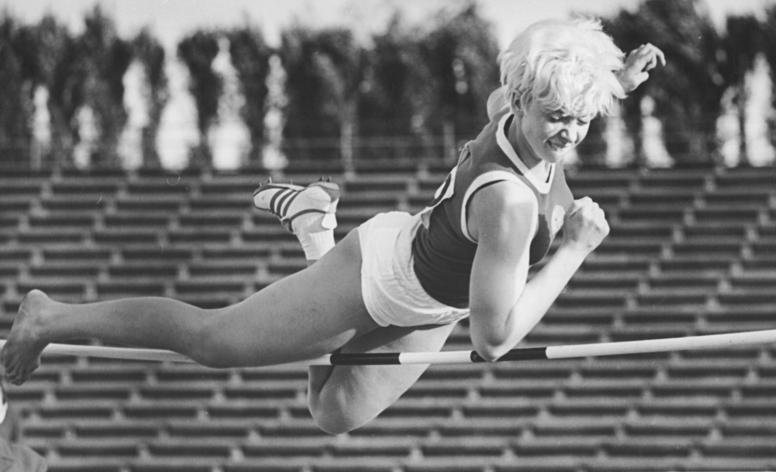
- Karin Rüger in 1964

Personal information
- Born: Karin Rüger; 1 April 1944 (age 81) Wernigerode, Germany
- Height: 1.82 m (6 ft 0 in)
- Weight: 79 kg (174 lb)

Sport
- Sport: High jump
- Club: SC DHfK, Leipzig

Karin Schulze (née Rüger; born 1 April 1944) is a retired German track and field athlete who specialized in high jump. She competed in the 1964 and 1968 Summer Olympics and finished ninth and seventh, respectively.

At the East German championships, she won bronze medals in 1964 and 1965 and the silver in 1968. She also became East German indoor champion in 1964 and 1971. She competed for the sports clubs SC DHfK Leipzig and SC Leipzig.

Between 1965 and 1968 she married Jens Schulze, also a competitive high jumper, and changer her name from Rüger to Rüger-Schulze. They had three children, all athletes: Thomas specialized in shot put, whereas Michael and Sabina Schulze became swimmers. Sabina won a gold medal at the 1988 Summer Olympics.
