= Renate Gärtner =

German high jumper

Personal information
- Nationality: German
- Born: 1 October 1952 (age 74) Leimenhof, West Germany

Sport
- Sport: Athletics
- Event: High jump

Renate Gärtner (born 1 October 1952) is a German athlete. She competed in the women's high jump at the 1972 Summer Olympics, representing West Germany.
