= Solveig Langkilde =

Danish high jumper

Personal information
- Nationality: Danish
- Born: 16 January 1950 (age 76)

Sport
- Sport: Athletics
- Event: High jump

Solveig Langkilde (born 16 January 1950) is a Danish athlete. She competed in the women's high jump at the 1972 Summer Olympics.
