= Ellen Mundinger =

German high jumper

Personal information
- Nationality: German
- Born: 14 January 1955 (age 71) Oberkirch, West Germany

Sport
- Sport: Athletics
- Event: High jump

Ellen Mundinger (born 14 January 1955) is a German athlete. She competed in the women's high jump at the 1972 Summer Olympics, representing West Germany.
