= Rosemarie Ackermann =

German former high jumper

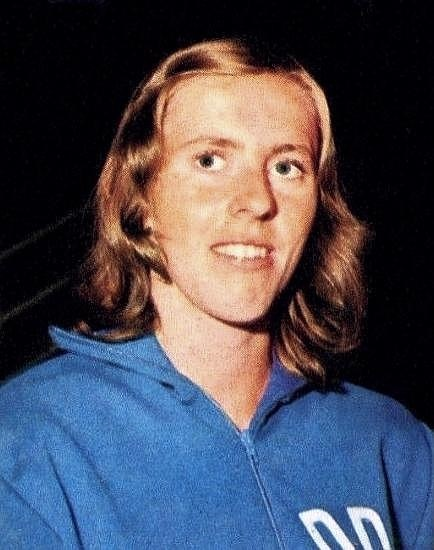

Medal record

Women's athletics

Representing East Germany

Olympic Games
Gold medal – first place	1976 Montreal	High jump

European Championships
Gold medal – first place	1974 Rome	High jump
Silver medal – second place	1978 Prague	High jump

European Indoor Championships
Gold medal – first place	1974 Gothenburg	High jump
Gold medal – first place	1975 Katowice	High jump
Gold medal – first place	1976 Munich	High jump

Rosemarie "Rosi" Ackermann (née Witschas; born 4 April 1952) is a German former high jumper, Olympic champion and multiple world record holder. In Berlin on 26 August 1977, she became the first female high jumper to clear a height of two metres.

== Biography ==
She was born in Lohsa, Saxony. As Rosemarie Witschas, she represented East Germany in the 1972 Summer Olympics in Munich, finishing seventh behind Ulrike Meyfarth.

In 1974, at the European Championships in Rome, she won her first international title, setting a new world record of 1.95m. Later that year, she married handball player Manfred Ackermann, and assumed his surname. Two years later, when she won the gold medal at the 1976 Summer Olympics held in Montreal, Canada.

On 26 August, 1977, she became the first woman to clear 2.00 metres.

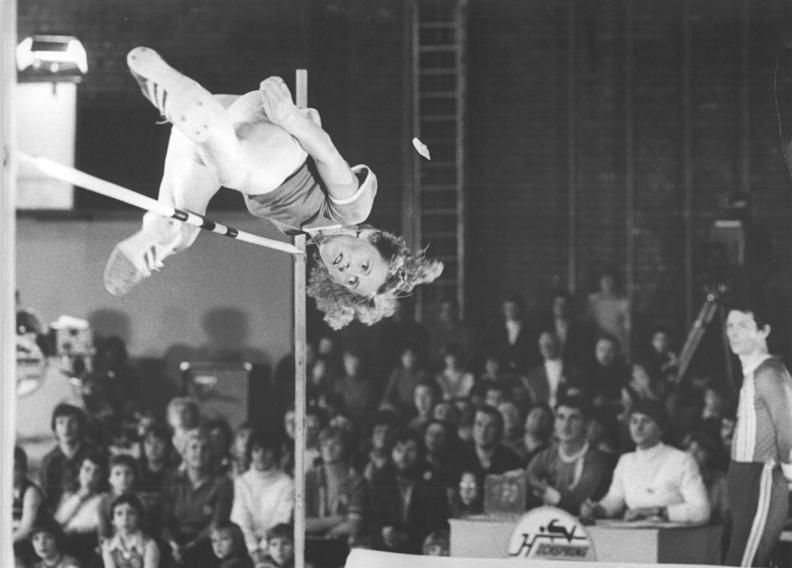
Ackermann competing at the Hochsprung mit Musik meeting, which she won in 1980.

In 1978, she lost her European title to Italian jumper Sara Simeoni. Ackermann retired from athletics after the 1980 Olympics, at which she placed fourth, just outside the medals.

Ackermann is the last female high jumper to set a world record using the straddle technique. She is also the last high jumper of either gender to win an Olympic gold medal in the high jump with that technique.

Competing for the sports club SC Cottbus, Ackerman was East German high jump champion in 1973, 1974, 1976, 1977, 1979 and 1980, and also won bronze medals in 1969 and 1972. She was the East German indoor champion in 1973, 1975, 1976, 1977 and 1980.

== See also ==
- Female two metres club

Records
Preceded by (Bulgaria) Yordanka Blagoeva	Women's High Jump World Record Holder; 24 August 1972 – 4 August 1978	Succeeded by (Italy) Sara Simeoni
Awards and achievements
Preceded by (Romania) Nadia Comăneci	United Press International; Athlete of the Year; 1977	Succeeded by (United States) Tracy Caulkins
Preceded by (East Germany) Kornelia Ender	East German Sportswoman of the Year; 1977	Succeeded by (East Germany) Marita Koch
Preceded by (Soviet Union) Tatyana Kazankina	Women's Track & Field Athlete of the Year; 1977	Succeeded by (East Germany) Marita Koch
Sporting positions
Preceded by Unknown	Women's High Jump Best Year Performance; 1977	Succeeded by (Italy) Sara Simeoni
Preceded by (Italy) Sara Simeoni	Women's High Jump Best Year Performance; 1979	Succeeded by (Italy) Sara Simeoni
