= Beatrix Rechner =

Swiss high jumper

Personal information
- Nationality: Swiss
- Born: 10 June 1951 (age 75)

Sport
- Sport: Athletics
- Event: High jump

Beatrix Rechner (born 10 June 1951) is a Swiss athlete. She competed in the women's high jump at the 1972 Summer Olympics.
