= Annette Harnack =

German high jumper

Personal information
- Born: 5 December 1958 (age 67) Uelzen, West Germany

Sport
- Sport: Track and field

Annette Harnack (born 5 December 1958) is a retired West German high jumper.

She finished eighth at the 1978 European Indoor Championships. She represented the sports clubs TV Sontra and TuS 04 Leverkusen, and won bronze medals at the West German championships in 1978 and 1979.

Her personal best jump was 1.90 metres, achieved in September 1979 in Mexico City.
