= Valentyna Kozyr =

Olympic medal record

Women's Athletics
Bronze medal – third place	1968 Mexico City	High jump

Valentyna Kozyr (Ukrainian: Валентина Козир) (born 25 April 1950) is a former Soviet athlete who competed mainly in the high jump.

Kozyr trained at Dynamo in Kiev. She competed for the USSR in the 1968 Summer Olympics held in Mexico City in the high jump where she won the bronze medal.
