= Nadezhda Marinenko =

Belarusian high jumper

Personal information
- Nationality: Belarusian
- Born: 23 February 1951 (age 75) Gomel, Soviet Union

Sport
- Sport: Athletics
- Event: High jump

Nadezhda Marinenko (born 23 February 1951) is a Belarusian athlete. She competed in the women's high jump at the 1976 Summer Olympics, representing the Soviet Union.
