= Astrid Tveit =

Norwegian high jumper

Astrid Tveit (born 26 June 1957) is a retired Norwegian high jumper. She represented Lillehammer IF and IL i BUL.

She finished tenth at the 1975 European Indoor Championships, fifteenth at the 1978 European Indoor Championships and tenth at the 1978 European Championships. She also competed at the European Championships in 1974 and 1982 as well as the 1976 Summer Olympics without reaching the finals. She became Norwegian champion in the years 1974-1979 and 1981.

Her personal best jump was 1.90 metres, achieved in June 1982 in Prague. This places her third among Norwegian high jumpers, only behind Hanne Haugland and Anne Gerd Eieland.
