= Jaroslava Valentová =

Czech high jumper

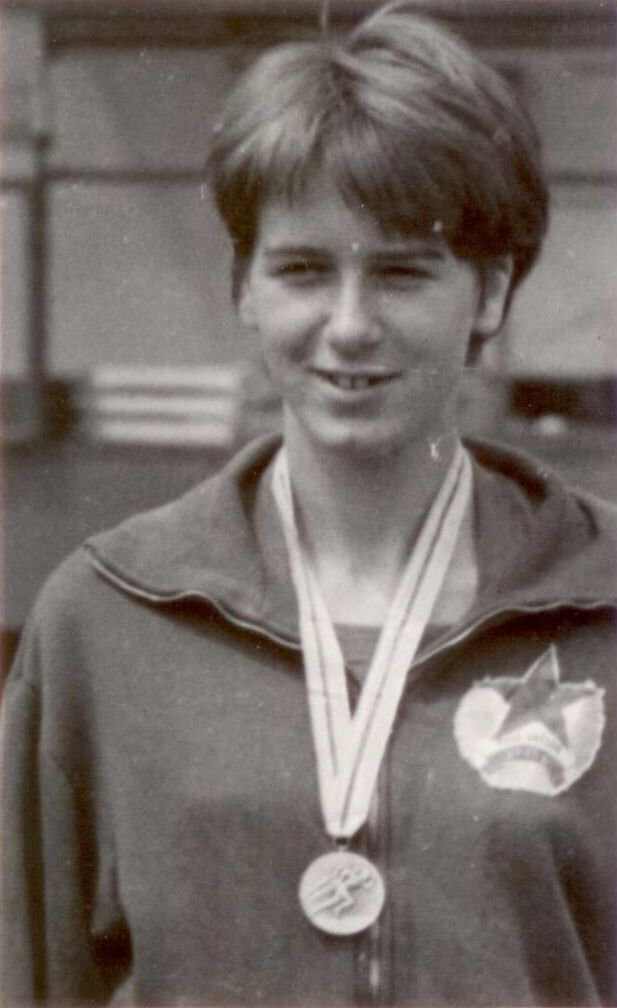
- Jaroslava Valentová

Personal information
- Nationality: Czech
- Born: 11 December 1945 (age 80) Prague, Czechoslovakia

Sport
- Sport: Athletics
- Event: High jump

Jaroslava Valentová (born 11 December 1945) is a Czech athlete. She competed in the women's high jump at the 1968 Summer Olympics.
