= Miloslava Rezková =

Czechoslovak high jumper

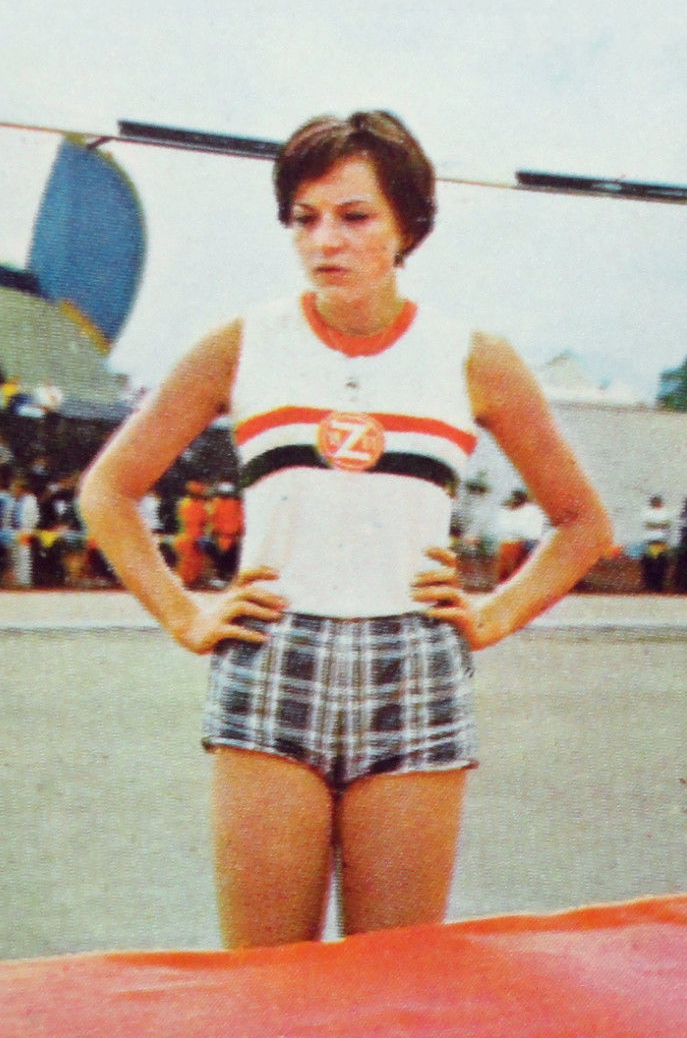
- Rezková in 1968

Personal information
- Full name: Miloslava Hübnerová-Rezková; Miloslava Rezková-Hübnerová
- Born: 22 July 1950 Prague, Czechoslovakia
- Died: 19 October 2014 (aged 64) Prague, Czech Republic
- Height: 1.73 m (5 ft 8 in)
- Weight: 63 kg (139 lb)

Sport
- Sport: Athletics
- Event: High jump
- Club: RH Praha

Achievements and titles
- Personal best: 1.87 m (1972)
Medal record
Women's athletics
Representing Czechoslovakia
Olympic Games
Gold medal – first place	1968 Mexico City	High jump
European Championships
Gold medal – first place	1969 Athens	High jump

Miloslava Rezková (Czech pronunciation: [ˈmɪloslava ˈrɛskovaː]; 22 July 1950 – 19 October 2014), married Miloslava Hübnerová, was a Czech high jumper who won gold medals at the 1968 Olympics and 1969 European Championships.

Rezková was born and raised in Prague, where she married Rudolf Hübner, a fellow Olympic high jumper. She first trained in ballet and rhythmic gymnastics before changing to the high jump. In 1968 she improved her personal best from 1.66 to 1.87 m, and became national and Olympic champion. In the high jump world ranking she was first in 1968 and 1969, sixth in 1970–71, and ninth in 1972–73. She retired after 1977 and later became a goldsmith and athletics coach.
