= Jutta Kirst =

East German high jumper

Personal information
- Born: 10 November 1954 (age 71) Dresden, Sachsen, East Germany

Sport
- Sport: Track and field
Medal record
Representing East Germany
Olympic Games
Bronze medal – third place	1980 Moscow	High jump
Summer Universiade
Silver medal – second place	1973 Moscow	High jump

Jutta Kirst, née Krautwurst, (born 10 November 1954) is a retired female track and field athlete who competed for East Germany during her career in the women's high jump. She competed at the 1980 Summer Olympics held in Moscow, Russia where she won the bronze medal in the women's high jump competition.
