= Breda Babošek =

Slovenian high jumper (1951–2025)

Personal information
- Nationality: Slovenian
- Born: 16 July 1951 Maribor, SFR Yugoslavia
- Died: 21 November 2025 (aged 74) Croatia

Sport
- Sport: Athletics
- Event: High jump

Breda Lorenci-Babošek (16 July 1951 – 21 November 2025) was a Slovenian athlete. She competed in the women's high jump at the 1972 Summer Olympics, representing Yugoslavia.

Babošek cleared 1.73 m in the qualifying round in Munich and did not advance to the final.

Prior to her Olympic appearance, Babošek won the bronze medal in the high jump at the 1971 Mediterranean Games with a leap of 1.74 m. She tied for 16th at the 1971 European Athletics Championships with a leap of 1.75 m.

She competed in the pentathlon at the 1978 European Athletics Championships where she finished 16th with 4064 points.

Her personal best in the high jump was 1.83 m set in Maribor in 1973.

She died on 21 November 2025 after being involved in a traffic incident earlier in August 2025 in Croatia.

== Personal bests ==
Event	Time/distance	Venue	Date
400 metres	57.6	Maribor, Slovenia	8 May 1978
80 m hurdles	12.3	Kranj, Slovenia	4 August 1968
100 m hurdles	14.24	Sofia, Bulgaria	19 August 1977
100 m hurdles	14.0 (h)	Subotica, Serbia	8 October 1978
Long Jump	5.94m	Celje, Slovenia	26 May 1973
Shot Put	14.51m	Nova Gorica, Slovenia	20 August 1978
Javelin Throw (old)	47.74m	Celje, Slovenia	30 May 1971

- All information from Slovenian Athletics Federation's all-time performance lists.

Two sources cite different personal bests for the pentathlon: World Athletics lists 4351 points in Thessaloniki, Greece, on 12 August 1978, and European Athletics lists 4029 points in Sofia, Bulgaria, on 12 August 1973.
