= Katya Lazova =

Bulgarian high jumper

Personal information
- Nationality: Bulgarian
- Born: 17 January 1950 (age 76) Kyustendil, Bulgaria

Sport
- Sport: Athletics
- Event: High jump

Katya Lazova (Bulgarian: Катя Лазова, born 17 January 1950) is a Bulgarian athlete. She competed in the women's high jump at the 1968 Summer Olympics.
