= Anne Lise Wærness =

Norwegian high jumper (born 1951)

Personal information
- Nationality: Norwegian
- Citizenship: Norwegian
- Born: 1 September 1951 (age 74) Trondheim

Sport
- Country: Norway
- Sport: Track and field
- Event: High jump

Achievements and titles
- Personal best: 1.74m
- Updated on 21 December 2014

Anne Lise Wærness (born 1 September 1951) is a Norwegian high jumper. She was born in Trondheim. She competed at the 1968 Summer Olympics in Mexico City. Her personal best is 1.74m.

She was awarded the Kongepokal trophy in 1967, for best female performance at the 1967 Norwegian Athletics Championships.
