= Ghislaine Barnay =

French high jumper

Personal information
- Nationality: France
- Born: 8 October 1945 (age 80) Fort-de-France
- Height: 1.76 m (5 ft 9 in)

Sport
- Event: High Jump

Ghislaine Barnay (born 8 October 1945 in Fort-de-France, Martinique) is a former French athlete who specialises in the women's high jump. Barnay competed at the 1968 Summer Olympics.

== Biography ==
Ghislaine Barnay won three French National Athletic titles in the High Jump, in 1967, 1968, and 1969. She bettered four times the French High Jump record, jumping successively 1.73 m, 1.74 m and 1.76 m in 1968, then 1.80 m in 1969.

She participated in the 1968 Olympic Games at Mexico, and placed ninth in the final with a jump of 1.71m.

She married Roger Bambuck in 1974.

=== Palmarès ===
- French National Outdoor Athletic Championships :
  - three times winner of the High Jump: 1967, 1968 and 1969.

=== Records ===
Records personnels
Event	Performance	Location	Date
High Jump	1.80m		1969
