= Pam Spencer =

American high jumper (born 1957)

Personal information
- Full name: Pamela Ann Spencer-Marquez
- Born: October 8, 1957 (age 68) Moses Lake, Washington, U.S.
- Height: 6 ft 2 in (1.87 m)

Sport
- Sport: Track and field
- Event: High jump
Medal record
Representing the United States
Pan American Games
Silver medal – second place	1979 San Juan	High jump

Pamela Ann Spencer-Marquez (born October 8, 1957) is a retired high jumper from the United States, who set her personal best on August 28, 1981, jumping 1.97 metres at a meet in Brussels, Belgium. She competed for her native country at the 1984 Summer Olympics in Los Angeles, California, finishing in eleventh place (1.85 metres).

Spencer grew up in Great Falls, Montana and attended Great Falls High School where she set state records in the high jump. She later attended Seattle Pacific University and California State University, Northridge where she graduated in 1981.

Spencer is a two-time national champion (1981 and 1984), and was a member of the 1976 and of the 1980 Olympic Teams which was unable to compete due to the 1980 Summer Olympics boycott. She did receive one of 461 Congressional Gold Medals created especially for the spurned athletes. In 1981, she raised the American record twice, up to her personal best of 1.97 m. Spencer was also a member of the 1984 U.S. Olympic Team.

Pam married Eric Marquez in 1982 and they have two children. They currently reside in Northridge, CA.

== International competitions ==
Year	Competition	Venue	Position	Notes
United States
1976	Olympic Games	Montreal, Canada	27th (q)	1.70 m
1979	Pan American Games	San Juan, Puerto Rico	2nd	1.87 m
1981	World Cup	Rome, Italy	3rd	1.92 m
1984	Olympic Games	Los Angeles, United States	11th	1.85 m

Sporting positions
Preceded by (Italy) Sara Simeoni	Women's High Jump Best Year Performance; 1981	Succeeded by (West Germany) Ulrike Meyfarth
Preceded by (United States) Coleen Rienstra	USA National High Jump Champion; 1981	Succeeded by (Canada) Debbie Brill
Preceded by (United States) Louise Ritter	USA National High Jump Champion; 1984	Succeeded by (United States) Louise Ritter
