= Barbara Inkpen =

British high jumper (1949–2021)

Barbara Lawson née Inkpen
Personal information
- Nationality: British (English)
- Born: 28 October 1949 Farnham, Surrey, England
- Died: 3 September 2021 (aged 71) Carshalton, London, England
- Height: 181 cm (5 ft 11 in)
- Weight: 68 kg (150 lb)

Sport
- Sport: Athletics
- Event: high jump
- Club: AFD
Medal record
Women's athletics
Representing Great Britain
European Championships
Silver medal – second place	1971 Helsinki	High jump
Representing England
British Commonwealth Games
Gold medal – first place	1974 Christchurch	High jump

Barbara Jean Lawton (née Inkpen; 28 October 1949 – 3 September 2021) was a track and field athlete from England, who mainly competed in the high jump event during her career and represented Great Britain at two Olympic Games.

== Biography ==
Inkpen trained at Aldershot, Farnham & District AC and finished second behind Dorothy Shirley in the high jump event at the 1968 WAAA Championships.

Later that year at the 1968 Olympic Games in Mexico City, she represented Great Britain in the high jump competition finishing 13th.

On Saturday 19 April 1969 she took the British record from 5 ft 9.25in to 5 ft 9.5in at Ewell, Surrey and on Saturday 7 June 1969 she took the British record to 5 ft 10 at the London Southern Women's Championship. The following month Inkpen became the national high jump champion after winning the British WAAA Championships title at the 1969 WAAA Championships.

Saturday 11 July 1970 she equalled the British record of 5 ft 10.5in at White City at the Great Britain v East Germany competition, after it had been taken to that record on 18 June 1969 in Sweden.

Inkpen married Carl Lawton in early 1973 and competed under her married name thereafter and as Lawton finished second behind Ilona Gusenbauer at the 1973 WAAA Championships.

She represented England and won a gold medal in the high jump event, at the 1974 British Commonwealth Games in Christchurch, New Zealand. She was also runner up in the 1972 Sports Woman Of The Year.
