= Alena Prosková =

Czech athlete

Personal information
- Nationality: Czech
- Born: 29 April 1948 (age 78) Plzeň, Czechoslovakia

Sport
- Country: Czechoslovakia
- Sport: Athletics
- Event: High jump

Alena Prosková, married Plischkeová (born 29 April 1948) is a Czech athlete. She competed for Czechoslovakia in the women's high jump at the 1972 Summer Olympics.

Her daughter Sylvia Plischke was a professional tennis player.
