= Cornelia Popa =

Romanian high jumper

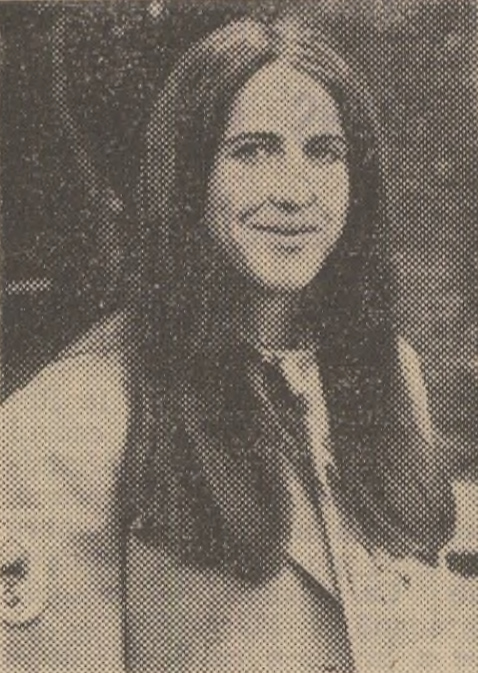
- Cornelia Popa in 1977

Personal information
- Nationality: Romanian
- Born: 27 August 1950 (age 76) Bucharest, Romania

Sport
- Sport: Athletics
- Event: High jump
Medal record
Women's athletics
Representing Romania
European Championships
Silver medal – second place	1971 Helsinki	High jump
European Indoor Championships
Silver medal – second place	1970 Vienna	High jump
Bronze medal – third place	1971 Sofia	High jump
Summer Universiade
Silver medal – second place	1970 Turin	High jump

Cornelia Popa (née Popescu; born 27 August 1950) is a Romanian athlete. She competed in the women's high jump at the 1972, 1976 and the 1980 Summer Olympics.
