= Mária Mračnová =

Slovak high jumper

Personal information
- Nationality: Slovak
- Born: 24 September 1946 (age 79) Košice, Czechoslovakia

Sport
- Sport: Athletics
- Event: High jump
Medal record
Women's athletics
Representing Czechoslovakia
European Championships
Bronze medal – third place	1969 Athens	High jump

Mária Mračnová (née Faithová; born 24 September 1946) is a Slovak athlete. She competed in the women's high jump at the 1968 Summer Olympics and the 1976 Summer Olympics.
