= Erika Rudolf =

Hungarian high jumper

Erika Rudolf (July 21, 1954 in Budapest – February 2009) was a Hungarian high jumper.

She finished eighth at the 1973 European Indoor Championships and fifth at the 1977 European Indoor Championships. She became Hungarian champion in 1971 and 1976.
