= Grith Ejstrup =

Danish high jumper (born 1953)

Personal information
- Nationality: Danish
- Born: 5 July 1953 (age 73)

Sport
- Sport: Athletics
- Event: High jump

Grith Ejstrup (born 5 July 1953) is a Danish athlete. She competed in the women's high jump at the 1972 Summer Olympics.
