= Ria Ahlers =

Dutch high jumper

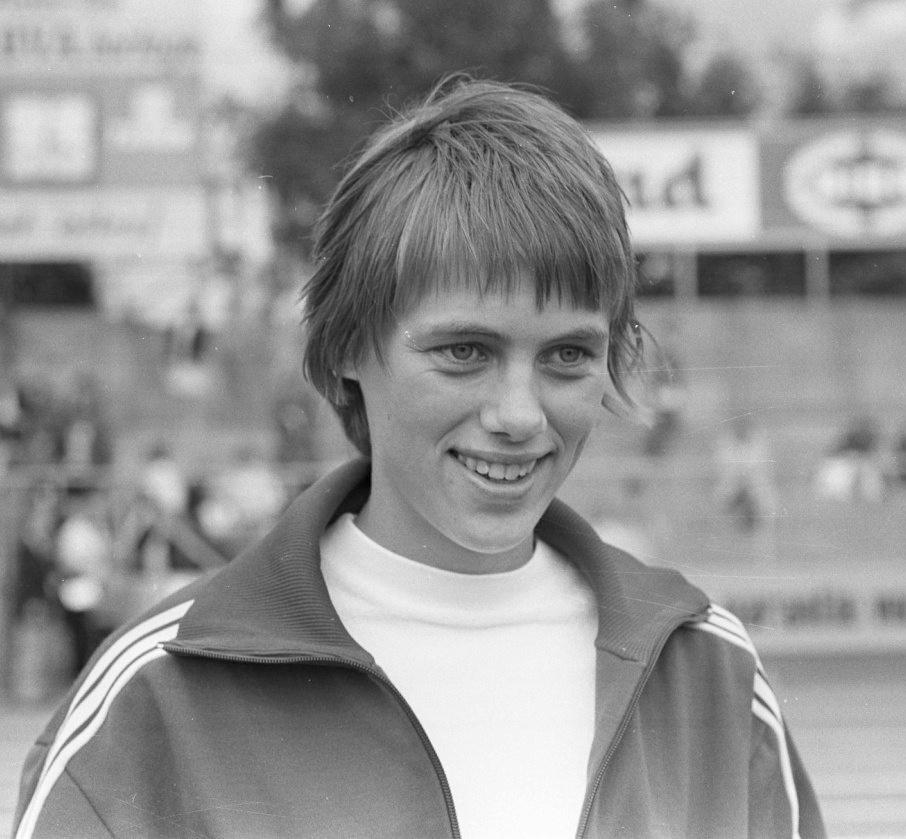
- Ria Ahlers in 1972

Personal information
- Born: 20 July 1954 (age 71) Groningen, Netherlands
- Height: 1.87 m (6 ft 2 in)
- Weight: 68 kg (150 lb)

Sport
- Sport: High jump
- Club: De Sperwers, Emmen

Maria "Ria" Ahlers (married Steenpaal) (born 20 July 1954) is a former high jumper from the Netherlands. She competed in the 1972 and 1976 Summer Olympics and finished in 16th and 12th place, respectively. Her personal best was 1.87 m (1976). She was a national champion in 1972, 1972 and 1976.
