= Antonina Lazareva =

Soviet high jumper

Personal information
- Born: March 27, 1941 (age 85) Serpukhov, Russian SFSR, Soviet Union

Sport
- Sport: Track and field
Medal record
Representing Soviet Union
Olympic Games
Silver medal – second place	1968 Mexico City	High jump
European Championships
Silver medal – second place	1969 Athens	High jump

Antonina Nikolayevna Lazareva (Russian: Антонина Николаевна Лазарева, née Окорокова, Okorokova; born March 27, 1941, in Serpukhov) is a Soviet former high jumper.

She won the silver medal at the 1968 Summer Olympics in Mexico City, Mexico. She won the bronze medal at the European Indoor Games in 1968 and 1969.
