= Milada Karbanová =

Czechoslovak Olympic athlete and high jumper

Medal record

Women's athletics

Representing Czechoslovakia

European Championships
Silver medal – second place	1974 Rome	High jump

European Indoor Championships
Gold medal – first place	1971 Sofia	High jump
Silver medal – second place	1974 Gothenburg	High jump
Bronze medal – third place	1973 Rotterdam	High jump
Bronze medal – third place	1976 Munich	High jump

Milada Karbanová, married Matoušová (born 27 March 1948 in Jablonec nad Nisou) is a retired high jumper from the Czech Republic. She won four medals at the European Indoor Championships as well as a silver medal at the 1974 European Championships in Athletics, representing Czechoslovakia. She also competed in the women's high jump at the 1972 Summer Olympics and the 1976 Summer Olympics.

== Achievements ==
Year	Competition	Venue	Position	Notes
1971	European Indoor Championships	Sofia, Bulgaria	1st	
1973	European Indoor Championships	Rotterdam, Netherlands	3rd	
1974	European Indoor Championships	Gothenburg, Sweden	2nd	
	European Championships	Rome, Italy	2nd	
1976	European Indoor Championships	Munich, West Germany	3rd	
