= Ilona Gusenbauer =

Austrian high jumper

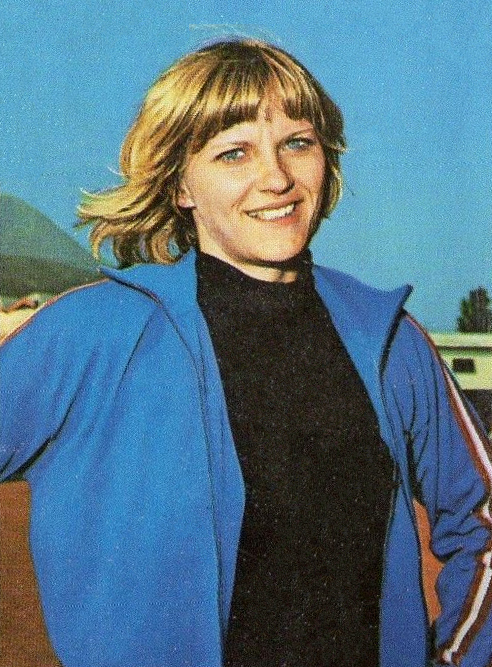
- Ilona Gusenbauer in 1972

Personal information
- Born: 16 September 1947 (age 78) Gummersbach, Germany
- Height: 1.81 m (5 ft 11 in)
- Weight: 67 kg (148 lb)

Sport
- Sport: Athletics
- Event: High jump
- Club: LAC Südstadt; ULC Wildschek

Achievements and titles
- Personal best: 1.93 m (1972)
Medal record
Women's athletics
Representing Austria
Olympic Games
Bronze medal – third place	1972 Munich	High jump
European Championships
Gold medal – first place	1971 Helsinki	High jump
European Indoor Championships
Gold medal – first place	1970 Vienna	High jump
Summer Universiade
Bronze medal – third place	1970 Turin	High jump

Ilona Maria Gusenbauer (née Majdan; born 16 September 1947) is a retired Austrian high jumper who competed at two Olympic Games.

== Biography ==
Gusenbauer competed at the 1968 and 1972 Olympics and finished in eighth and third place, respectively. She held the world record for more than a year starting in 1971, and was the Austrian champion in 1966–1973, 1975 and 1976.

Gusenbauer won the British WAAA Championships title in the high jump event at the 1973 WAAA Championships.

Records
Preceded by (Romania) Iolanda Balaș	Women's High Jump World Record Holder; 4 September 1971 – 24 September 1972	Succeeded by (Bulgaria) Yordanka Blagoeva
