= Magdolna Komka =

Hungarian high jumper (1949–2024)

Magdolna Komka (née Csábi, 1 August 1949 – 9 February 2024) was a Hungarian high jumper. She finished seventh at the 1970 European Indoor Championships and fourth at the 1972 European Indoor Championships. She was the Hungarian champion in 1968, 1969, 1970, and 1972.

Komka also competed in the women's high jump at the 1968 Summer Olympics and the 1972 Summer Olympics.

Komka died on 9 February 2024, at the age of 74.
