= Snežana Hrepevnik =

Serbian high jumper

Personal information
- Born: 13 November 1948 Umka, Yugoslavia
- Died: 13 May 1981 (aged 32) Belgrade, Yugoslavia

Sport
- Sport: Track and field
Medal record
Representing Yugoslavia
Mediterranean Games
Gold medal – first place	1967 Tunisia	High jump
Gold medal – first place	1971 Izmir	High jump
Silver medal – second place	1975 Algiers	High jump
Universiade
Gold medal – first place	1970 Turin	High jump

Snežana Hrepevnik (13 November 1948 – 13 May 1981) was a Serbian high jumper who competed in the 1968, 1972 and 1976 Summer Olympics. She finished 14th at the 1968 Summer Olympics, 20th at the 1972 Summer Olympics and 12th at the 1976 Summer Olympics. She was born in Umka and died in Belgrade.
