= Yordanka Blagoeva =

Bulgarian high jumper (born 1947)

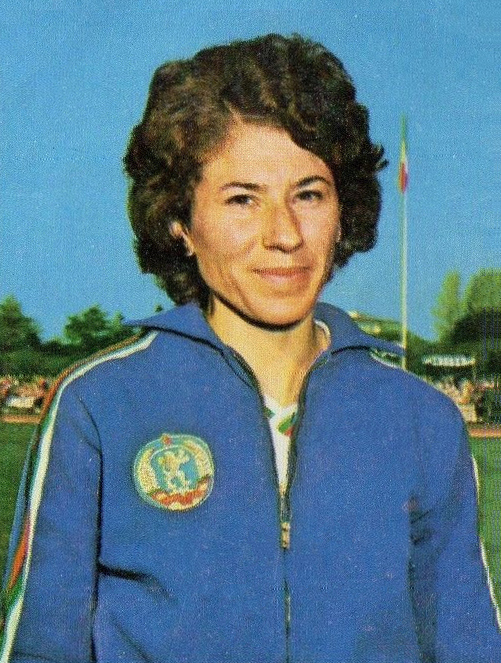

Personal information
- Born: 19 January 1947 (age 79) Gorno Tserovene, Montana, Bulgaria
- Height: 1.75 m (5 ft 9 in)
- Weight: 64 kg (141 lb)

Sport
- Sport: Athletics
- Event: High jump
- Club: Septemwriyska slava, Levski-Spartak Club

Achievements and titles
- Personal best: 1.94 m (1972)
Medal record
Representing Bulgaria
Olympic Games
Silver medal – second place	1972 Munich	High jump
Bronze medal – third place	1976 Montreal	High jump
European Athletics Indoor Championships
Gold medal – first place	1973 Rotterdam	High jump
Silver medal – second place	1969 Belgrade	High jump
Bronze medal – third place	1972 Grenoble	High jump
Universiade
Gold medal – first place	1965 Budapest	High jump

Yordanka Blagoeva (Bulgarian: Йорданка Благоева; born 19 January 1947) is a former Bulgarian high jumper. She competed in the 1968, 1972, 1976 and 1980 Olympics and finished in 17th, 2nd (silver medal), 3rd (bronze medal) and 16th place, respectively. She won the high jump at the 1965 Summer Universiade and 1973 European Athletics Indoor Championships. On 24 September 1972 she became the first Bulgarian athlete to break a world record. in the following year, she also set a new indoor high jump record, and was ranked as the best high jumper in Europe.

In 1972 Yordanka Blagoeva graduated from a Sports Academy. She later served as president of Bulgarian aerobics federation.

She is considered to be one of Bulgaria's top athletes. In 2017, when she was aged 70, the documentary film Beyond the Jump was made to cover her life and career.

Records
Preceded by (West Germany) Ulrike Meyfarth	Women's High Jump World Record Holder; 24 September 1972 – 24 August 1974	Succeeded by (East Germany) Rosemarie Witschas
Sporting positions
Preceded by (Bulgaria) Katya Lazova	Women's Bulgarian National Champion; 1972–1973	Succeeded by (Bulgaria) Stanka Valkanova
Preceded by (Bulgaria) Tatyana Kamareva	Women's Bulgarian National Champion; 1979–1980	Succeeded by (Bulgaria) Lyudmila Andonova
