= Rita Kirst =

German high jumper (born 1950)

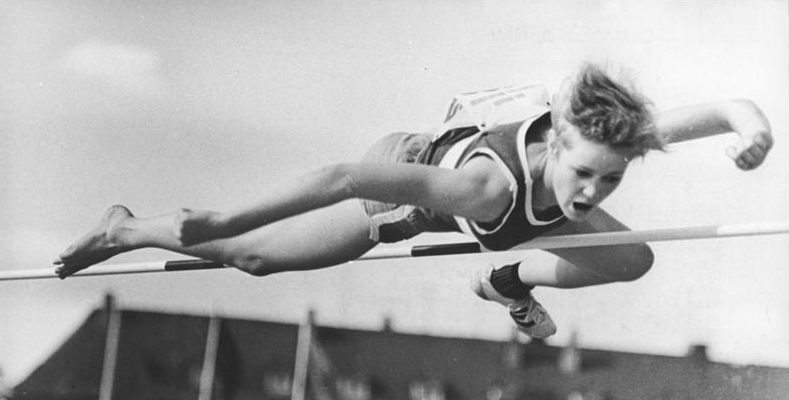
- Rita Schmidt in 1968

Personal information
- Born: 21 October 1950 (age 75) Großgrimma, East Germany
- Height: 1.72 m (5 ft 8 in)
- Weight: 64 kg (141 lb)

Sport
- Sport: High jump
- Club: SC DHfK, Leipzig
Medal record
Representing East Germany
European Championships (indoors)
Gold medal – first place	1968 Madrid	High jump
Gold medal – first place	1969 Belgrade	High jump
Gold medal – first place	1972 Grenoble	High jump
Bronze medal – third place	1970 Vienna	High jump
Bronze medal – third place	1974 Gothenburg	High jump

Rita Kirst (née Schmidt on 21 October 1950) is a retired German high jumper. She competed at the 1968, 1972 and 1976 Summer Olympics and finished in fifth, fifth and 22nd place, respectively. Between 1968 and 1974 she won three gold and two bronze medals at the European indoor championships. Her personal best is 1.92 m (1974).

She became East German champion six consecutive seasons: 1967 - 1972. She won three silver medals in 1973, 1974 and 1976 and a final gold medal in 1975. She also became East German indoor champion in 1968, 1969, 1970 and 1972. She competed for the sports club SC DHfK Leipzig, and after marrying, ASK Vorwärts Potsdam.

In 1972 she married Joachim Kirst, an Olympic decathlete, and would later compete as Rita Kirst. Her sister-in-law Jutta Kirst won a bronze medal in high jump at the 1980 Olympics.
