= 1886 AAA Championships =

Outdoor track and field competition

- Dates: 3 July
- Host city: London, England
- Venue: Stamford Bridge (stadium)
- Level: Senior
- Type: Outdoor
- Events: 14

The 1886 AAA Championships was an outdoor track and field competition organised by the Amateur Athletic Association (AAA), held on Saturday 3 July at Stamford Bridge, London, England.

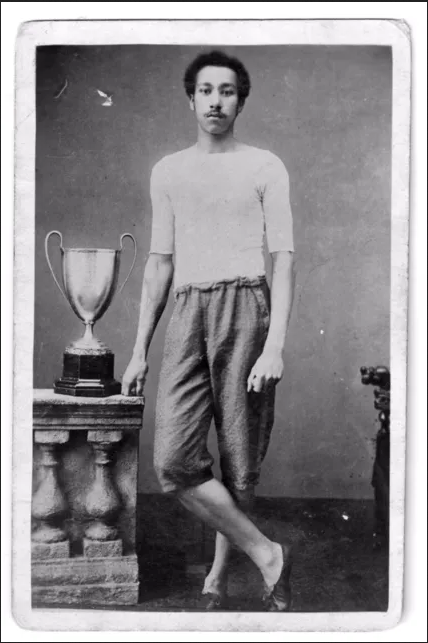
Arthur Wharton (Cleveland Coll.) with the Prince Hassan Cup for the AAA 100 yards.

== Summary ==
Competitions took place in magnificent, almost tropical, weather, that was, if anything, too hot for athletes in the longer events. The attendance was lower than on previous occasions with not more than two thousand spectators inside the ground when competition commenced at three o'clock in the afternoon. The band of the 4th Middlesex Regiment entertained spectators between events and the prizes were presented by Mrs Montague Shearman, wife of the President of the AAAs and the 440 yards champion in 1880.

The fourteen events on the programme were for men only, with heats and finals all held on the same day, with the exception of the 10 miles race, which was held on the following Monday, 5 July, at the same venue. The programme was changed slightly, placing the 880 yard final first in the order of events to separate it as much as possible from the 1 mile. In subsequent years they swapped the 880 yards and 1 mile over, to make the 1 mile as far as possible from the 4 miles.

There were no heats in the field events, some of which had only two or three competitors, and the only track event in which heats were necessary was the 100 yards. It was customary at the time for race winners only to have their performances recorded, therefore, in the tables below other competitors are shown with the distance each man was behind the man in front. Field event performances are shown in feet and inches as they were originally measured, with a conversion to metric measurement in parentheses. Conversions have been obtained using the International Metric Conversion Tables published by the International Amateur Athletics Federation in 1970.

The only competitor from outside of Great Britain was Peter James from Sydney, who competed without distinction in the 100 yards. He was the first Australian competitor since Bernhard Wise won the mile in 1881. The first Australian athletic championship was held at Moore Park, Sydney, in May 1890.

The editor of a Dublin newspaper, The Sport, sponsored a "team" of three athletes from Ireland to come to the championship, paying their travel and accommodation expenses for their stay at the Bedford Head Hotel in Tottenham Court Road, London. Irish athletes had won three events at the championship in 1885 and they were looking to repeat their success.

Only four 1885 champions returned to defend their titles. Charles Daft (Notts Forest FC) the 120 yard hurdles title, James Jervis (Liverpool H.) defended the 7 miles walk, John Purcell (Dublin AC) the long jump, and Thomas Ray (Ulverston AC) the pole jump. Walter George and William Snook, both of Moseley Harriers, who had between them won eighteen championships at distances from 880 yards to 10 miles, had both turned professional and the opportunity this presented caused entries to rise in many events, with over seventy entries from thirty-six different clubs.

Two world records were equalled during the afternoon and championship best performances were set in four different events. Arthur Wharton (Cleveland Coll.), ran ten seconds for the 100 yards in both heat and final to erase all previous doubtful marks at the distance from the record books. Wharton had beaten James Cowie, the reigning champion, at Widnes on 5 June and so was not a completely unknown athlete, but with Cowie injured and unable to defend his crown the missionary student from Jamestown in Ghana exceeded all expectations and won convincingly by a clear yard. In the process he also became the first black athlete to win a AAA Championship title at any event.

Charles Daft (Notts Forest FC) equalled the world record of 16 seconds in the 120 yard hurdles to retain the title he had won last year, and give Notts Forest Football Club their third consecutive win, making them the most successful club at this event so far.

Championship best marks were also set by Charles Wood (Blackheath H.) in the 440 yards, who became the first British amateur to break 50 seconds for the distance, and by James Mitchel (Gaelic AA), from Emly, County Tipperary in Ireland, in winning the hammer.

Thomas Ray (Ulverston AC) won the pole jump for the sixth time, the last three of them on consecutive occasions.

== Results ==
Event	1st	2nd	3rd
100 yards	(Gold Coast (British colony)) Arthur Wharton	Charles George Wood	Frank T. Ritchie
440 yards	Charles George Wood	W. Lyle-Smith	Ernest Durrant Robinson
880 yards	Ernest Durrant Robinson	Francis Stuart Howard	H. Haines
1 mile	Thomas Benwell Nalder	Francis John Kynaston Cross	Thomas Radford Bryden
4 miles	Charles Rogers	C. H. L. Clarke	C. A. Morgan
10 miles	William Henry Coad	(Scotland) Alex P. Findlay	A. G. Arnold
steeplechase	M. A. Harrison	William Dudman	Arthur Painter
120yd hurdles	Charles Frederick Daft	Sherard Joyce	Godfrey Barnsley Shaw
7 miles walk	Joseph Howard Jullie	William Wheeler	C. W. V. Clarke
high jump	George William Rowdon	Sidney Octavius Purves	Alfred Edward Nuttall
pole jump	Thomas Ray	F. G. F. Thompson	n/a
long jump	(Leinster) John Purcell	Ernest W. Horwood	(Scotland) J. Barbour
shot put	(Leinster) James Mitchel	F. G. F. Thompson	n/a
hammer throw	(Leinster) James Mitchel	(Scotland) John D. Gruer	n/a

== Event summary ==
=== 100 yards ===
100 yards
Pos	Athlete	Club	Time / Dist
1.	Arthur Wharton	Cleveland Coll., Darlington	10 secs.
2.	Charles George Wood	Blackheath H.	1 yd
3.	Frank T. Ritchie	Bradford FC	1 ft
4.	John D. Bassett	South Norwood AC	
5.	R. F. Shaw	Hereford FC	

Notes: 3 heats. first 2 in the two fastest heats and one man from the slowest heat qualify for the final.

James Cowie (London AC) had won the 100 yards championship for the three previous years but wrote an open letter to Sporting Life to apologise to his many fans that he would be unable to defend his title this year due to an injury. This left just two men in the first of three heats from which five men qualified for the final, to be run at three forty-five. Arthur Wharton, a student at Cleveland College in Darlington, caused a sensation by winning heat 3 in 10 seconds flat. The record at 100 yards had been in doubt for several years with many more or less dubious claims to have run ten seconds. Wharton was the first man to do it under championship conditions where there can be no doubt that all of the rules had been complied with, that the officials were fully competent and experienced men, that the time had been recorded on three accurate watches, and that neither the track nor the wind were offering any assistance. In the final, forty-five minutes later, Wharton got away well and after covering 70 yards was two yards clear of the field. In the closing stages Charles Wood (Blackheath H.) narrowed the gap but Wharton reproduced his marvellous time and won by a clear yard.

=== Quarter–mile ===
Quarter–mile
Pos	Athlete	Club	Time / Dist
1.	Charles George Wood	Blackheath H.	49 4/5
2.	W. Lyle-Smith	South London H.	3 yd
3.	Ernest Durrant Robinson	South London H.	3 yd
4.	W. Lock	Spartan H.	
5.	C. N. Jones	South London H.	

Notes: no heats. only 5 finished.

Forty minutes after contesting the final of the 100 yards both Charles Wood (Blackheath H.) and Arthur Wharton (Cleveland Coll.) lined up for the heats of the quarter mile, but only six of the eleven entries reported and it was decided to hold it as a straight final, giving them a further two hours to recover from their exertions. Wood, from Dereham in Norfolk, had finished second to James Cowie in 1884 and was thought to be the man to beat, but W. Lyle-Smith (Civil Service FC) who had won the Civil Service sports in convincing style, Arthur Wharton, the 100 yards champion, and Ernest Robinson (South London H.) the 880 yards champion, also lined up to contest the event at five to six in the evening. Wood went off the quickest, followed closely by Wharton with Lyle-Smith third and Robinson fourth. At half way Wood increased his lead over Wharton and both Lyle-Smith and Robinson overtook the 100 yards champion who stopped running just before reaching 300 yards. Lyle-Smith and Robinson fought each other and in doing so began to close the gap on Wood but could get no closer than three yards. Wood was the first British amateur to break 50 seconds and all five finishers beat 52 seconds.

=== Half–mile ===
half–mile
Pos	Athlete	Club	Time / Dist
1.	Ernest Durrant Robinson	South London H.	1:59
2.	Francis Stuart Howard	South London H.	1:59 1/2
3.	H. Haines	Faringdon, Berks.	10 yd
4.	J. A. P. Clarke	London AC	
5.	A. Bessell	Highgate H.	

Notes: only 5 competitors

The half-mile was the first event on the programme, with just five men facing the starter. H. Haines from Faringdon in Berkshire took the lead from the gun closely followed by Ernest Robinson (South London H.), the favourite, with Francis Howard also of South London H. in close attendance on his club mate. Approaching the bell Robinson went to the front and opened up a gap and Howard passed Haines for second place. They remained in that order to the line with Robinson doing enough to stay comfortably ahead and won by three yards just inside two minutes while Haines fell off the pace. splits, 440 yards: 55.4, 1:59 (63.6).

=== 1 mile ===
1 mile
Pos	Athlete	Club	Time / Dist
1.	Thomas Benwell Nalder	Knowle CC, Bristol	4:25.8
2.	Francis John Kynaston Cross	Oxford Un. AC	15 yd
3.	Thomas Radford Bryden	Clapham Rovers FC	2 yd
4.	H. C. Mabey	South London H.	10 yd
5.	William Pollock-Hill	South London H.	4:31
6?	E. Leaver	South London H.	

Notes: Cross, Bryden and Mabey beat standard time of 4:30

Thomas Nalder (Knowle CC), originally from Evershot in Dorset (b. 10 Dec 1864), had been quietly building a reputation in the West of England for the past three years by winning open races at distances from quarter mile to three miles at places like Newport, Bristol, and Weston-Super-Mare, and just one week before the championship he won a strong handicap mile at Cheltenham but came to London to contest the championship for the first time largely unknown by the London crowd. Francis Cross (Oxford Un. AC) from Eccles in Lancashire, won the mile at the Oxford University sports in March and the same distance at the Oxford vs Cambridge match at Lillie Bridge in April, and was thought by many to be the man most likely to succeed at the championship. Since Walter George and William Snook had turned professional the role of premier middle-distance runner in the country was still undecided. This had encouraged more entries to the championship this year but left those more intent on gambling on the results with little information on which to base their odds. Nalder took the lead from the gun and quickly opened up a six-yard gap over H. Haines from Faringdon and Francis Cross (Oxford Un. AC) with Thomas Bryden (Clapham Rovers F.C.) in fourth. On the second lap Bryden moved up into second place and the gap to Nalder was reduced to around two yards. Haines may have dropped out by this point. On the third lap Cross moved up onto Nalder's shoulder and at the bell he went in front, but only briefly as Nalder quickly responded and took back the lead and strode away majestically but well within himself and won by 15 yards in a time that could have been much faster had he been pressed on the final lap. Cross held off Bryden for second place.

=== 4miles ===
4 miles
Pos	Athlete	Club	Time / Dist
1.	Charles Rogers	Portsmouth H.	21:01 4/5
2.	C. H. L. Clarke	Spartan H.	21:16 1/5
3.	C. A. Morgan	Blackheath H.	21:41
4.	J. E. W. Sanders	Malden H.	21:47
5.	W. E. Moody	Finchley H.	21:48

Notes: “The Field” gives the winning time as 21:16 1/5

William Coad (South London H.) had finished second in the 10 miles in 1885 and had come back looking to improve on that position in the 4 miles. From the gun he put himself on the shoulder of Charles Rogers (Portsmouth H.) who took the lead, then there was a short gap to C. A. Morgan (Blackheath H.) and C. H. L. Clarke (Spartan H.). They went through the first mile in that order then Clarke's shoe lace came undone and he ran the rest of the race in some discomfort with his shoe threatening to come off at any moment. Rogers gradually opened up a gap on Coad that was up to 70 yards by two miles at which point S. K. Atkins (Spartan H.) retired and three laps later Coad also stopped. This left Rogers almost 90 yards in front of Clarke at the three miles point but the Spartan made a plucky effort over the closing mile, despite the problem with his shoe, and closed the gap considerably but Rogers spurted at the end to make sure there were no mistakes and won comfortably by around eighty yards. splits, 1 mile: 4:50.2, 9:59.4 (5:09.2), 15:23.6 (5:24.2), 21:01.8 (5:38.2); 2 miles: 9:59.4, 21:01.8 (11:02.4).

=== 10 miles ===
10 miles
Pos	Athlete	Club	Time / Dist
1.	William Henry Coad	South London H.	55:44 1/5
2.	Alex P. Findlay	Ayr FC	55:52 2/5
3.	A. G. Arnold	Spartan H.	220 yds
4.	W. White	Highgate H.	1/2 mile

Notes: Stamford Bridge, 5 July, 6 starters, only 4 finished

At half past six on Monday evening a good number of spectators convened at the same venue where six men faced the starter for the 10 miles. Alex Findlay (Ayr FC), the favourite, on account of his win in the Scottish Championship at the Powderhall Grounds in June, took the lead, followed by Charles Rogers (Portsmouth H.), who had won the 4 miles on Saturday. These two were followed by Walter White (Highgate H.), W. E. Moody (Finchley H.), and William H. Coad (South London H.), who finished second in this race last year but dropped out of the 4 miles on Saturday. A. G. Arnold (Spartan H.) was bringing up the rear. After one mile Arnold moved up into third place and these three started to draw away from the field but Findlay continued to lead. By two miles they had a lead of twenty yards when Rogers, the 4 miles champion, took over the lead. Findlay and Rogers then alternated the lead and at three and a half miles Coad moved up into third spot, with Arnold fourth. By four miles Coad had assumed the lead followed by Rogers, Findlay and Arnold in that order. Moody and White were together around half a lap behind. In the twenty-first lap Rogers retired, and Arnold started gradually losing ground on the leaders so Coad and Findlay pulled away together. Coad was leading at five miles with Findlay close on his heels but the lead changed between him and Findlay twice in the next half mile. Findlay kept the lead from five and a half miles up to seven miles, but Coad was shadowing him closely and there was never more than a couple of yards between them. In that time Moody retired, and White was lapped by the two leaders. In the eighth mile Arnold started running better and, making up some of the lost ground, he lapped White. Coad made several attempts to take the lead but Findlay quickly took it back each time and at the bell they were still together, Findlay slightly ahead. On the bend Coad took the lead and Findlay sat on his shoulder giving every impression that he was poised to pounce but with 200 yards to go it was Coad who sprinted away from the front and won by sixty yards. Arnold was around half a lap behind Findlay but there being only two timekeepers he was not timed. splits, 1 mile: 5:09.4, 10:31.8 (5:22.4), 15:56.8 (5:25.0), 21:18.0 (5:21.2), 26:55.0 (5:37.0), 32:36.4 (5:41.4), 38:30.4 (5:54.0), 44:19.8 (5:49.4), 50:13.2 (5:53.4), 55:41.2 (5:28.0); 2 miles: 10:31.8, 21:18.0 (10:46.2), 32:36.4 (11:18.4), 44:19.8 (11:43.4), 55:41.2 (11:21.4); 5 miles: 26:55, 55:41.2 (28:46.2).

=== Steeplechase ===
Steeplechase
Pos	Athlete	Club	Time / Dist
1.	M. A. Harrison	Spartan H.	11:12
2.	William Dudman	South London H.	
3.	Arthur Painter	London AC	ret (near end)
4.	Frank Denman	Blackheath H.	ret (3 laps)

Notes: 4 starters, only 2 finished

In the steeplechase, over a distance of around 2 miles, M. A. Harrison (Spartan H. and Theale FC) took the lead but was quickly passed by Arthur Painter (London AC) and William Dudman (South London H.). These two then cut out the pace while the fourth man, Frank Denman (Blackheath H.) retired after three laps. At that point Painter led by twelve yards but Dudman pulled up to him and at the water jump Painter pulled away again. This was repeated for a number of laps with Dudman drawing level only for Painter to pull away at the water jump. Meanwhile, Harrison hung back around fifty yards behind the leading pair. When there was just 500 yards to go Harrison made his move and quickly pulled level with the other two and went by them so easily that Painter stopped running on the spot and did not finish while Dudman slowed down and leisurely trotted in a long way behind the winner.

=== 120 yards hurdles ===
120 yards hurdles
Pos	Athlete	Club	Time / Dist
1.	Charles Frederick Daft	Notts Forest FC	16 secs.
2.	Sherard Joyce	Cambridge Un. AC	1 yd
3.	Godfrey Barnsley Shaw	Ealing H.	2 yd
4.	Sidney Octavius Purves	Cambridge Un. AC	

Notes: 2 heats. first 2 in each heat qualify for the final. Purves fell at the sixth hurdle.

Charles Daft (23 July 1864 - 10 October 1918) came from a large family of sportsmen. His father Charles Daft played cricket for Nottinghamshire 1862–65, and also captained Nottingham Forest FC in a match against Notts County. His uncle Richard Daft also played cricket for Nottinghamshire and for the All England Eleven. And his cousin Harry Daft played football for Notts County, and was left winger for the England football team. Charles himself specialised in the 120 yard hurdles, winning the AAA championship three times, and finishing second twice, and was considered, "the most stylish hurdler who ever ran."

There were two heats with the first two from each heat qualifying for the final. Daft ran in the first heat and the other three men in the heat were all from either Oxford or Cambridge. Two of them had competed in the Oxford vs Cambridge match in March, Thomas Bowlby of Balliol College, Oxford, had finished second and Joseph Orford of King's College, Cambridge had finished fourth. They finished in third and fourth positions in their heat won by Daft by a yard from the relatively unknown Sherard Joyce (Cambridge Un. AC). The second heat went to Godfrey Shaw (Ealing H.) in the same time as the first with Sidney Purves (Cambridge Un. AC) 1 yard behind. In the final, thirty-five minutes later, there was little between them at half way then Purves fell at the next hurdle while Daft and Joyce edged ahead of Shaw. They rose together for the final hurdle but Daft gained a yard on the run-in and won in a record equalling 16 seconds. The record Daft equalled had been set by Clement Jackson (Oxford Un. AC) in November 1865, and equalled by Samuel Palmer (Cambridge Un. AC) in April 1878. It was not equalled again until May 1890 and remained a world record until May 1891.

=== High jump ===
High Jump
Pos	Athlete	Club	Time / Dist
1.	George William Rowdon	Teignmouth FC	5 ft 11 1/2in (1.81m)
2.	Sidney Octavius Purves	Cambridge Un. AC	5 ft 9 1/4in (1.76m)
3.	Alfred Edward Nuttall	St Bartholomew's Hospital AC	5 ft 8 1/4in (1.73m)
4.	Thomas Ray	Ulverston AC	
5.	E. J. Walsh	Haddington H., Dublin	

Notes: 5 competitors.

=== Pole jump ===
Pole jump
Pos	Athlete	Club	Time / Dist
1.	Thomas Ray	Ulverston AC	10 ft 11 1/2in (3.34m)
2.	F. G. F. Thompson	London AC	10 ft 0in (3.05m)

Notes: only 2 competitors

=== Long jump ===
Long Jump
Pos	Athlete	Club	Time / Dist
1.	John Purcell	Dublin AC	22 ft 4in (6.81m)
2.	Ernest W. Horwood	Brackley	21 ft 7 1/4in (6.58m)
3.	J. Barbour	London Caledonians FC	21 ft 1in (6.12m)
4.	George William Rowdon	Teignmouth FC	
5.	Leopold C. Harvey	Spalding	

Notes: Purcell subsequently cleared 22 ft 9 1/2in (6.95m) in an exhibition

In the long jump, John Purcell of Dublin retained the title he had won last year with a jump of 22 ft 4in (6.81m), more than five inches further than he jumped last year and making him only the fifth man to exceed 22 ft (6.70m) in the championship. Then he made an exhibition jump of 22 ft 9 1/2in (6.95m). The world record at that point was 23 ft 2in (7.06m) by Patrick Davin of Ireland.

=== Shot put ===
Shot Put
Pos	Athlete	Club	Time / Dist
1.	James Sarsfield Mitchell	Gaelic AA, Emly, Ireland	38 ft 1in (11.61m)
2.	F. G. F. Thompson	London AC	37 ft 0in (11.28m)

Notes: only 2 competitors

=== Hammer throw ===
Hammer
Pos	Athlete	Club	Time / Dist
1.	James Sarsfield Mitchell	Gaelic AA, Emly, Ireland	110 ft 4in (33.64m)
2.	John D. Gruer	London Scottish RFC	94 ft 11in (28.94m)

Notes: only 2 competitors

=== 7 miles walk ===
7 miles walk
Pos	Athlete	Club	Time / Dist
1.	Joseph Howard Jullie	Finchley H.	56:30 1/2
2.	William Wheeler	Southampton H.	500-660 yd
3.	C. W. V. Clarke	Reading AC and Spartan H.	ret (4.5 miles)
4.	James Jervis	Liverpool H.	ret (3.5 miles)
5.	Arthur Ockelford	Spartan H.	ret (3.5 miles)
6.	Frederick Bettison	Highgate H.	ret (2 miles)
7.	James Ackwood	Salford H.	ret (1.5 miles)

Notes: only 2 finishers

The 7 miles walk started just after half past four at the hottest part of a hot afternoon with very little wind and the heat played a part in deciding the championship. There were eight entries and seven starters and only two men are confirmed to have finished. The starters included James Jervis (Liverpool H.), last year's winner returning to defend his title. Willie Wheeler (Southampton AC) took the lead from the start closely followed by James Ackwood (Salford H.). Before the end of the first lap the lead had been taken by C. W. V. Clarke (Reading AC and Spartan H.) while Jervis moved up into second place and Wheeler fell behind. Just before one mile Clarke stopped to adjust his shoe, losing around sixty yards, and Jervis passed the one mile point as clear leader with Ackwood in second place, Clarke third. Just short of one and a half miles Ackwood retired, leaving Clarke in second and Arthur Ockelford (Spartan H.) in third, Frederick Bettison (Highgate H.) was fourth and Wheeler, the early leader, now fifth. Over the next half mile Clarke worked hard to catch Jervis and these two moved away from the rest of the field, swapping places regularly but neither man able to keep it for long. Just before two miles Bettison retired. At three and a half miles Ockelford retired, and then Jervis received a caution from the walking judge. Indignant at this, he retired, leaving Clarke a long way out on his own with the next man being Joseph Jullie (Finchley H.) almost a whole lap behind and Wheeler was the only other man still on the track. With three miles to go less than half the field remained and it now became apparent that Clarke's battle with Jervis had taken more out of him than it seemed and he started to show signs of unsteadiness that gradually became more pronounced. He started to weave from one side of the track to the other. Then he staggered, and it became obvious that he was seriously unwell, the spectators shouted to the officials to "take him off." Eventually he fell into the arms of one of the judges and was carried on to the grass. A doctor was called and he was taken to the changing rooms and ultimately to St George's Hospital. Meanwhile, Jullie, found himself unexpectedly in the lead and Wheeler, who had been dead last for most of the race, was now almost certain to get a second-place medal, if he could finish. Fortunately, there was no more drama and these two walked safely home in that order with Jullie around half a lap in front, but under the circumstances the times were unexceptional. splits, 1 mile: Jervis 7:15, Jervis 14:57.2 (7:42.2), Jervis 22:59.2 (8:02), Clarke 31:05.6 (8:06.4), Jullie 40:48.6 (9:43), Jullie 49:34 (8:45.4), Jullie 58:30 (8:56). The following day it was reported that Clarke had recovered well from his ordeal and he was discharged from hospital the same afternoon.

== Championship records ==
Event	Athlete	Time / Dist	Year
100 yards	Arthur Wharton (Cleveland Coll., Darlington)	10 secs.	1886
440 yards	Charles George Wood (Blackheath H.)	49 4/5	1886
880 yards	William Birkett (London AC)	1:58	1883
1 mile	Walter Goodall George (Moseley H.)	4:18 2/5	1884
4 miles	Walter Goodall George (Moseley H.)	20:12 4/5	1884
10 miles	William Snook (Moseley H.)	53:25 1/5	1885
120 yards hurdles	Charles Frederick Daft (Notts Forest FC)	16 secs.	1886
High jump	Patrick Davin (Ireland)	6 ft 1/2in (1.84m)	1881
Pole jump	Thomas Ray (Ulverston CC)	11 ft 3in (3.43m)	1881
Long jump	John Whitehill Parsons (Edinburgh H.)	23 ft 0 1/4in (7.01m)	1883
Shot put	Donald J. Mackinnon (London Scottish FC)	43 ft 0 1/2in (13.12m)	1885
Hammer	James Sarsfield Mitchell (Gaelic AA)	110 ft 4in (33.64m)	1886
7 miles walk	William Henry Meek (West Side AC, New York)	54:27	1884

"Notes:" Performances in the Steeplechase are not comparable until the event was standardised in the 1930s.

== Ten second claims prior to 1886 ==
The first man for whom a 100 yards time of ten seconds is claimed is Thomas Bury (b. 2 Aug 1831) of Nottingham, who studied at Winchester College and joined Emmanuel College, Cambridge, in May 1852 where he played mostly cricket, earning his Blue in 1855. In that same year, at the Emmanuel College Sports at Fenners on 29 November, his win in the 100 yards was claimed to have been in 10 seconds, beating Henry Vernon by "half a head".

Four years later a student at Oxford University had the same claim made for him. Henry Clark Powell from Stretton-on-Dunsmore, Warwickshire, went to Rugby School and Oriel College, Oxford, and at the Oriel College sports at Cowley in March 1859 he beat six others to win by a yard from Edward Isaac in ten seconds.

James Mason (b. 18 May 1840) from Sherburn, then in Yorkshire, went to Marlborough College and St Catharine's College, Cambridge, and at the Cambridge University sports in June 1861 won the 100 yards in "just under ten seconds."

In 1862 three men were reported to have run 100 yards in ten seconds. In April, at Bolton & Grasshoppers cricket ground near Earls Court in London, R. B. Fenwick of Bolton & Grasshoppers supposedly ran ten seconds on wet grass. Then in November two men at Oxford University are reported to have done it a mere ten days apart. Frederick Rawlins Evans from Chilvers Coton, Warwickshire, won the Exeter College sports on the Cowley School recreation grounds on Wednesday 12 November, and William Edmond Heap, from Bradwall, near Sandbach in Cheshire, while at Brasenose College, Oxford, won the Oxford University sports at Cowley Marsh on Saturday 22 November.

After that claims become a bit more frequent with six men reputed to have run ten seconds in 1863. These include the widely reported performance by Benjamin Stewart Darbyshire at the Wadham College sports in November. Originally from West Darby in Lancaster, Benjamin Darbyshire, while a student at Wadham College, Oxford, also won the 100 yards and 440 yards at the first Oxford vs Cambridge sports the following year.

William Mitchell and John Trevor are both supposed to have run ten seconds at the Liverpool Olympic Festival in July 1864. Mitchell won the third heat and Trevor beat him by one yard in the final the same afternoon. These are just two of the eight claims for ten seconds in 1864.

The 1864 claims also include the first claim from outside of England. F. F. Groom is reported to have run ten seconds at Melbourne Cricket Ground in September 1864, in winning the first heat in which twelve men ran a supposedly "very close" finish. In the very next heat, G. Tait beat ten other men and was an "easy winner." The final was won in 10 1/2 seconds by J. G. Harris, who gets his own mention in this list by running a claimed ten seconds himself at the same meet in 1866.

The first report from the United States of 100 yards being run in ten seconds arrives in 1877, Horace Lee supposedly ran that time in Philadelphia on 5 May, and Laussat Geyelin, mere inches behind him, is also reported as having run ten seconds flat. A more credible performance was that by Rene La Montagne at the Manhattan AC Games on the Mott Haven track in New York on 29 June 1878. La Montagne is reported to have done it twice more. At the Staten Island AC Games on the West Brighton Grounds in New York on 28 September 1878, ratified by the AAU as the American record for the event, and at the same meet one year later where he was, allegedly, penalised for a false start and put back 1 yard, and therefore supposedly ran 101 yards in ten seconds.

Lon Myers is reported to have run ten seconds twice in 1880, in the heat and final of the Manhattan AC Games in New York on 18 September, with, in both cases, a slight diagonal wind.

Just two days before the 1886 AAAs championships, Wendell Baker ran two world record performances on the Beacon Park track in Boston, Massachusetts. Early in the afternoon he ran ten seconds for 100 yards, with the three watches recording 9 4/5, 10.0 and 10 1/5, but the effort apparently tore his shoe, for later that afternoon he broke the world record for 440 yards despite his shoe failing mid-race and coming off altogether so that he ran the last 120 yards with only one shoe.

According to Don Potts and Peter Lovesey, two widely regarded experts in the field, all of these performances should be treated with a degree of scepticism and suspicion. The standards of and rules concerning track measurement, timekeeping, starting, and wind measurement, were very different then. It was not even agreed that races should start with a pistol shot and many of them were started by word of mouth, or by dropping a handkerchief, which introduces the difficulty of knowing when, exactly, to start the watch. The effects of sloping tracks, false starts, and other inconsistencies were also not properly appreciated and allowed for.

Modern sports historians generally agree that Arthur Wharton's performances at the 1886 AAAs championships were the first that meet all the criteria for accuracy and fairness and can be reliably ratified as records.

The first man to reliably record a time of less than ten seconds was the American John R. Owen who was timed in 9 4/5 in the AAU Championships at Columbia Athletic Club Grounds, Washington, DC, on 11 October 1890. The first British athletes to record a time of less than ten seconds were both in the same race. Alfred Downer, born in Jamaica but brought up in Edinburgh and running for Scottish Pelicans AC won six Scottish sprint titles, three each at 100 yards and 220 yards from 1893 to 1895. On Saturday 20 July 1895 he won the 100 yards at the very first Ireland vs Scotland international at Celtic Park, Glasgow. Charles Alfred Bradley (b. 14 Mar 1869) of Huddersfield AC, won the AAAs 100 yard championship four times in succession from 1892 to 1895. On Tuesday 6 August 1895 they met at the twenty-ninth annual Stoke Victoria AC Sports in Stoke-on-Trent for an invitation 100 yards scratch. Bradley got the better start and led by about a yard at halfway, then the Scot started to close up as they neared the tape and at the line the judges could not separate them and a dead heat was declared with the time given as ten seconds. Later that afternoon they ran again, to resolve the tie. As with the first race, Bradley got the better start and was clearly leading at halfway but Downer got up to his man and it was again declared a dead heat. The time was given as 9 4/5 seconds, to share, unofficially, with five other men, the world record. But there was only one timekeeper so it could never be officially considered a record.

The first performance ratified by the IAAF, as it then was, as a world record for 100 yards was 9 3/5 by Daniel Kelly at the Pacific Northwest AAU Championship at Spokane, Washington, on 23 June 1906.
