= 1885 AAA Championships =

Outdoor track and field competition

- Dates: 27 June
- Host city: Southport, England
- Venue: Southport F.C.
- Level: Senior
- Type: Outdoor
- Events: 14

The 1885 AAA Championships was an outdoor track and field competition organised by the Amateur Athletic Association (AAA), held on Saturday 27 June at the Southport Sports Ground, Southport, England.

== Summary ==
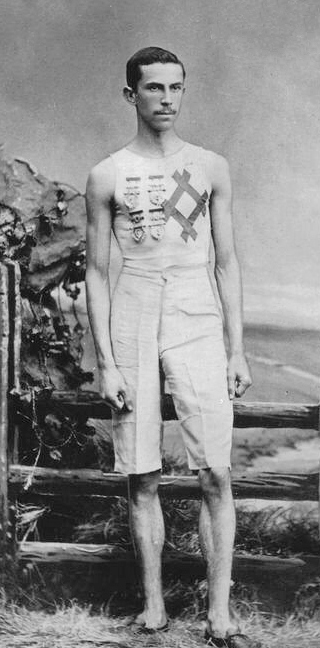
The American Lon Myers won two titles

Competitions took place in beautiful weather in front of around 6,000 spectators. At the conclusion the prizes were presented by Mr. G. A. Pilkington, the Mayor of Southport.

The fourteen events on the programme were for men only, with heats and finals all held on the same day, with the exception of the 10 miles race, which was held on the following Monday, 29 June, at the same venue. The track, the home of Southport Athletic Club, was a cinder circuit 440 yards in circumference with a grass infield where the hurdle races were held, and there were stands of reserved seating on both sides of the stadium. This was the first time the championship had been held on a 440 yard track, which was described as being in "capital condition". There were three official timekeepers and they employed the services of a professional starter, Tom Wilkinson from Sheffield.

There were no heats in the field events, some of which had only two or three competitors, and the only track event in which heats were necessary was the 120 yards hurdles. It was customary at the time for race winners only to have their performances recorded, therefore, in the tables below other competitors are shown with the distance each man was behind the man in front. Field event performances are shown in feet and inches as they were originally measured, with a conversion to metric measurement in parentheses. Conversions have been obtained using the International Metric Conversion Tables published by the International Amateur Athletics Federation in 1970.

Three Americans, all members of Manhattan AC in New York, competed at the championships. Lyndon P. Smith (100 yards), Laurence Eugene `Lon' Myers (440 yards, and 880 yards), and Alexander A. Jordan (120 yards hurdles). Jordan was entered in the long jump but took no part in the competition. The three Americans ran in their club colours of a white vest with a cherry diamond on the left breast, cherry coloured shorts with a cherry sash worn around the waist. Myers, as was his usual custom, wore a white handkerchief tied round his head. William Henry Meek (West Side AC, New York), the holder of the 7 miles walk championship, has since turned professional and was unable to defend his title.

Three other champions did not defend their titles. Charles Gowthorpe (Notts Forest FC) relinquished the 120 yards hurdles title, Ernest Horwood (Blackheath H.) did not defend his long jump title, and most notable of all was that Walter George (Moseley H.) had turned professional during the winter of 1884-85 and was unable to defend any of the four titles he had won last year. His chief motivation for this was a significant personal debt acquired through a gambling habit.

Three events, 10 miles, shot and hammer, saw new championship best performances. In fact, only two men finished the ten miles but they both beat the previous best performance. William Barry (Queen's College AC, Cork), who won the hammer, broke the world record for the hammer four times in 1885, taking John Gruer's 1883 mark of 101ft 2 1/2in (30.84m) to 119ft 0in (36.28m) on 1 October in New York. In 1887 Barry became the first man to throw 120 feet (36.58m) and he retired in 1888 with a best of 129ft 3 1/2in (39.40m). And Donald Mackinnon (London Scottish RFC), after winning the shot put and finishing second in the hammer at these championships, had an exhibition throw measured at 111ft 3in (33.92m).

James Cowie (London AC) successfully defended his 100 yards title and for winning this event three years in succession was awarded a gold medal by the AAAs. Three yards behind Cowie was the American Lyndon Smith, and he explained his defeat by saying that having enjoyed himself too much in Paris before the championships he was not in condition, but under the circumstances he felt satisfied at getting second place.

Three weeks before the championship Cowie had raced Lon Myers over 440 yards at the Civil Service Sports at Stamford Bridge. With eighty yards to go Cowie was leading but his shoe burst open and he had to stop and Myers won in a new world record time of 48 4/5 seconds. This was the fastest time Myers ever ran as an amateur. That, however, had been a handicap race in which Cowie got an eight yard start. In the championship, a level race, Myers won easily, taking the lead after twenty-five yards and staying comfortably in front without being pressed.

Myers repeated this in the 880 yards, allowing his only opponent to lead for the first lap then cruising past and winning easily. There were similarly only two competitors in both the 1 mile and 4 miles races. William Snook (Birchfield H.) and T. G. Stewart (Liverpool Gymnasium H.). Snook was an experienced runner and the results of these races was not in doubt, but Stewart, a younger man at the start of his career, was commended for the way he stuck to his opponent and prevented them from being a simple procession. Ultimately Snook won them both in unexceptional times. Split times for the 4 miles are as follows: 1 mile, Stewart 5:09, Snook 10:44 (5:35), Snook 16:26 (5:42), Snook 21:51.8 (5:25.8), 2 miles: Snook 10:44, Snook 21:51.8 (11:07.8).

At the start of the 7 miles walk Michael Hayes (Limerick AA & BC) took the lead, closely followed by J. Jervis (Liverpool AC) and Fred Crowther (Wakefield FC). J. R. Lewis (Newton FC) was fourth and Arthur Gough (Liverpool H.) was last. Before they had completed one lap Gough was disqualified. Shortly after they passed one mile Lewis passed Crowther who retired at that point. Hayes and Jervis then moved gradually away from Lewis with Hayes in front and Jervis on his heels until half a mile from home when Jervis spurted into the lead and pulled away winning by around 200 yards. splits, 1 mile: 7:05, 14:50 (7:45), 22:52 (8:02), 31:06 (8:14), 39:26 (8:20), 47:36 (8:10), 56:10.6 (8:34.6).

There were two heats of the 120 yards hurdles, with the first two in each heat qualifying for the final. There were, though, only nine flights of hurdles set out for the heats. This error was noticed in time for there to be the correct number of ten flights for the final. Sidney Purves (Cambridge Un. AC) and Alexander Jordan (Manhattan AC, New York) qualified from heat one in which A. McNeil (Oxford Un. AC) retired two hurdles from home. In the second heat Charles Daft (Notts Forest FC) and Ernest Lloyd (Clapham Rovers FC) qualified for the final while Sherard Joyce (Cambridge Un. AC) fell at the last hurdle. In the final Daft, who was from the same club as Charles Gowthorpe, last year's winner, led from start to finish and won "in grand style."

The only Englishman in the field events was Thomas Ray (Ulverston AC), the world record holder in the pole jump. He won that event with ease and finished second in the high jump, setting a personal best of 5ft 10in (1.78m).

Spectators returned to the same venue on Monday evening for the ten miles race. There had been six entries for this event but there were only four starters and two of them did not finish. William Coad (South London H.) took the early lead from F. A. Prescott (Cheshire Tally-Ho) and T. G. Stewart (Liverpool Gymnasium H.), with William Snook (Moseley H.) bringing up the rear. After little more than one mile Prescott retired and Stewart, no doubt suffering from his two plucky attempts to beat Snook on Saturday, retired at around three and a half miles. Meanwhile, Snook and Coad were locked in combat. Snook took the lead in the fifth lap, and just before they reached two miles Coad passed him and went in front. They repeated this several times, with each man taking the lead for a short while only to be passed again in turn with never more than a few yards between them. At the start of the last lap Coad was leading, and then, with only two hundred yards remaining Snook put in a tremendous spurt and won by around twenty yards. Both men beat the previous championship best performance and their effort received a generous round of applause from an appreciative crowd. splits, 1 mile: 5:07.5, 10:25.5 (5:18), 15:42 (5:16.5), 21:37.5 (5:55.5), 26:22 (4:44.5), 31:38 (5:16), 37:09 (5:31), 42:37.5 (5:28.5), 48:08 (5:30.5), 53:25.2 (5:17.2).

== Results ==
Event	1st	2nd	3rd
100 yards	(Scotland) James John Milroy Cowie	Lyndon P. Smith	N. W. Howard McLean
440 yards	(United States) Lon Myers	(Scotland) James John Milroy Cowie	Alfred R. Hind
880 yards	(United States) Lon Myers	G. W. Wathen	n/a
1 mile	William Snook	T. G. Stewart	n/a
4 miles	William Snook	T. G. Stewart	n/a
10 miles	William Snook	William Henry Coad	n/a
steeplechase	William Snook	G. W. Wathen	n/a
120yd hurdles	Charles Frederick Daft	Sidney Octavius Purves	Ernest H. Lloyd
7 miles walk	James Jervis	(Leinster) Michael J. Hayes	J. R. Lewis
high jump	(Leinster) Patrick Kelly	Thomas Ray	Sidney Octavius Purves
pole vault	Thomas Ray	(Leinster) Patrick Joseph Kelly	n/a
long jump	(Leinster) John Purcell	(Leinster) Patrick Joseph Kelly	n/a
shot put	(Scotland) Donald J. Mackinnon	(Leinster) Owen Harte	(Leinster) William Joseph Murphy Barry
hammer throw	(Leinster) William Joseph Murphy Barry	(Scotland) Donald J. Mackinnon	(Scotland) Henry Michie

== Event summary ==
100 yards
Pos	Athlete	Club	Time / Dist
1.	James John Milroy Cowie	London AC	10 2/5
2.	Lyndon P. Smith	Manhattan AC	2 - 3 yd
3.	N. W. Howard McLean	Shifnal	1 yd

Notes: no heats. only 3 competitors.

440 yards
Pos	Athlete	Club	Time / Dist
1.	Lon Myers	Manhattan Athletic Club	52 2/5
2.	James John Milroy Cowie	London AC	4 - 6 yd
3.	Alfred R. Hind	Notts Forest FC	1 - 1 1/2 yd

Notes: no heats. only 3 competitors.

880 yards
Pos	Athlete	Club	Time / Dist
1.	Lon Myers	Manhattan AC	2:01
2.	G. W. Wathen	Liverpool CC	60-70 yd

Notes: only 2 competitors

1 mile
Pos	Athlete	Club	Time / Dist
1.	William Snook	Moseley H.	4:44
2.	T. G. Stewart	Liverpool Gymnasium H.	6-10 yd

Notes: only 2 competitors.

4 miles
Pos	Athlete	Club	Time / Dist
1.	William Snook	Moseley H.	21:51 4/5
2.	T. G. Stewart	Liverpool Gymnasium H.	10 yd

Notes: only 2 competitors.

10 miles
Pos	Athlete	Club	Time / Dist
1.	William Snook	Moseley H.	53:25 1/5
2.	William Henry Coad	South London H.	53:28

Notes: only 2 competitors

Steeplechase
Pos	Athlete	Club	Time / Dist
1.	William Snook	Moseley H.	11:38 1/5
2.	G. W. Wathen	Liverpool CC	300 yd

Notes: only 2 competitors.

120 yards hurdles
Pos	Athlete	Club	Time / Dist
1.	Charles Frederick Daft	Notts Forest FC	16 3/5
2.	Sidney Octavius Purves	Cambridge Un. AC	3 yd
3.	Ernest H. Lloyd	Clapton Rovers FC	2 yd
4.	Alexander A. Jordan	Manhattan AC	4 yds

Notes: 2 heats, both run over only nine flights of hurdles. the correct ten flights were used in the final.

High Jump
Pos	Athlete	Club	Time / Dist
1.	Patrick Joseph Kelly	French College, Dublin	5ft 11in (1.80m)
2.	Thomas Ray	Ulverston AC	5ft 10in (1.78m)
3=	Sidney Octavius Purves	Cambridge Un. AC	5ft 7in (1.70m)
3=	Alfred Edward Nuttall	St Bartholomew’s Hospital AC	5ft 7in (1.70m)

Notes: only 4 competitors

Pole jump
Pos	Athlete	Club	Time / Dist
1.	Thomas Ray	Ulverston AC	10ft 0in (3.05m)
2.	Patrick Joseph Kelly	French College, Dublin	9ft 2in (2.79m)

Notes: only 2 competitors

Long Jump
Pos	Athlete	Club	Time / Dist
1.	John Purcell	Dublin AC	21ft 10 1/2in (6.67m)
2.	Patrick Joseph Kelly	French College, Dublin	18ft 11 1/2in (5.78m)

Notes: only 2 competitors.

Shot Put
Pos	Athlete	Club	Time / Dist
1.	Donald J. Mackinnon	London Scottish FC	43ft 0 1/2in (13.12m)
2.	Owen Harte	Boyle FC & AA	39ft 0 1/4 (11.89m)
3.	William Joseph Murphy Barry	Queen's College AC, Cork	37ft 7 1/2in (11.47m)
4?	A. Foster	Old Carthusians	
5?	T. Bolton	Rochdale	

Notes: 5 competitors

Hammer
Pos	Athlete	Club	Time / Dist
1.	William Joseph Murphy Barry	Queen's College AC, Cork	108ft 10 3/4in (33.18m)
2.	Donald J. Mackinnon	London Scottish RFC	104ft 2 1/4in (31.76m)
3.	Henry Michie	Pitlochry AC	97ft 10 1/2in (29.82m)
4.	Owen Harte	Boyle FC & AA	96ft 8 1/4in (29.46m)

Notes: 4 competitors. Mackinnon later had an exhibition throw of 111ft 3in (33.92m).

7 miles walk
Pos	Athlete	Club	Time / Dist
1.	James Jervis	Liverpool H.	56:10 3/5
2.	Michael J. Hayes	Limerick AA & BC	57:17 1/5
3.	J. R. Lewis	Newton FC	600 yd

Notes: only 3 finished.

== Championship records ==
Event	Athlete	Time / Dist	Year
100 yards	William Page Phillips (London AC)	10 1/5	1880
	William Page Phillips (London AC)	10 1/5	1882
	James John Milroy Cowie (London AC)	10 1/5	1883
	James John Milroy Cowie (London AC)	10 1/5	1884
440 yards	Henry Rawlins Ball (London AC)	50 1/5	1882
880 yards	William Birkett (London AC)	1:58	1883
1 mile	Walter Goodall George (Moseley H.)	4:18 2/5	1884
4 miles	Walter Goodall George (Moseley H.)	20:12 4/5	1884
10 miles	William Snook (Moseley H.)	53:25 1/5	1885
120 yards hurdles	Samuel Palmer (Cambridge Un. AC)	16 1/5	1883
High jump	Patrick Davin (Ireland)	6ft 1/2in (1.84m)	1881
Pole jump	Thomas Ray (Ulverston CC)	11ft 3in (3.43m)	1881
Long jump	John Whitehill Parsons (Edinburgh H.)	23ft 0 1/4in (7.01m)	1883
Shot put	Donald J. Mackinnon (London Scottish FC)	43ft 0 1/2in (13.12m)	1885
Hammer	William Joseph Murphy Barry (Queen's College AC)	108ft 10 3/4in (33.18m)	1885
7 miles walk	William Henry Meek (West Side AC, New York)	54:27	1884

"Notes:" Performances in the Steeplechase are not comparable until the event was standardised in the 1930s.
