= 1884 AAA Championships =

Outdoor track and field competition

- Dates: 21 June
- Host city: Birmingham, England
- Venue: Aston Lower Grounds
- Level: Senior
- Type: Outdoor
- Events: 14

The 1884 AAA Championships was an outdoor track and field competition organised by the Amateur Athletic Association (AAA), held on Saturday 21 June at Aston Lower Grounds, Birmingham, England.

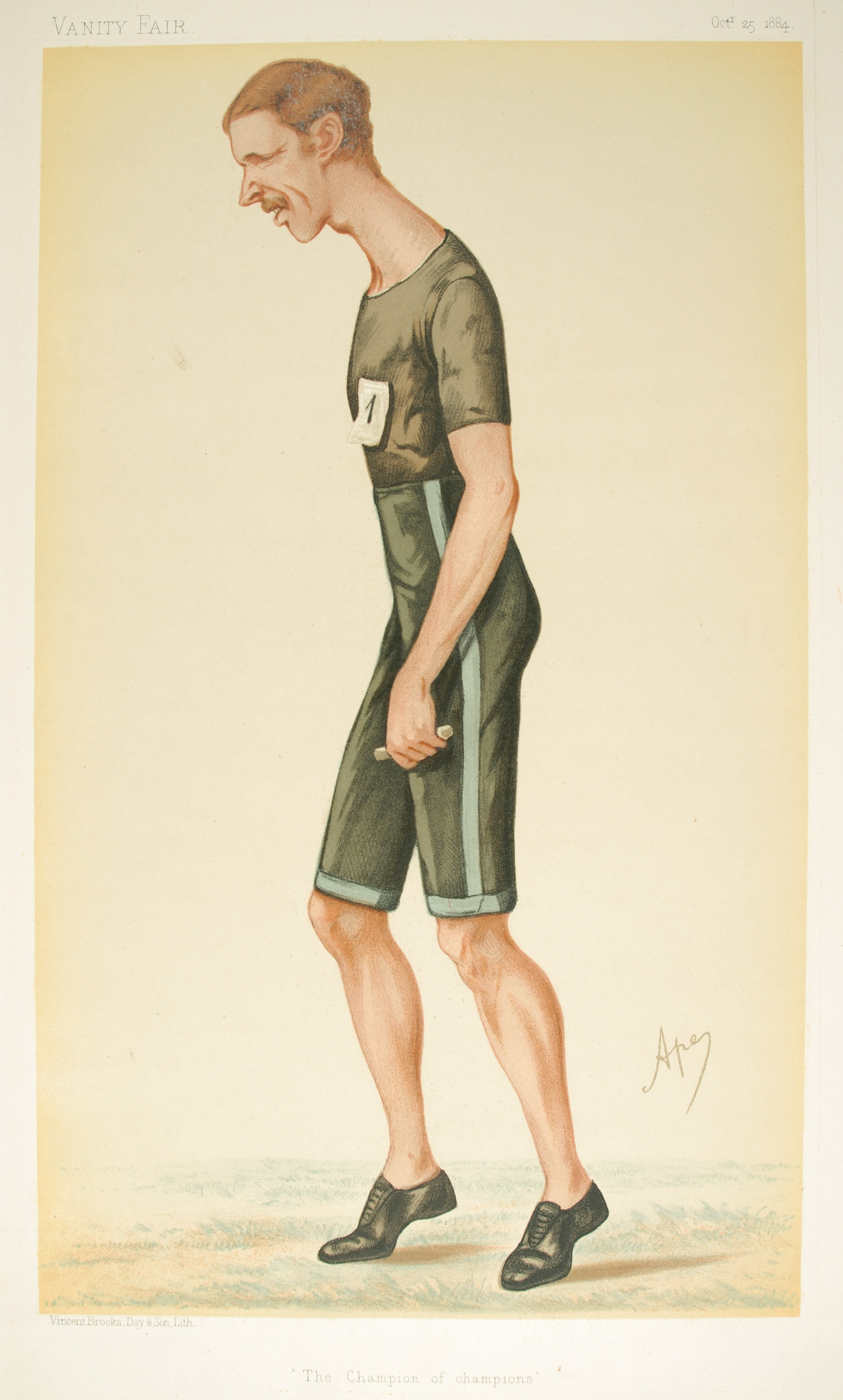
Walter George "The Champion of Champions": caricature by Ape, published in Vanity Fair in 1884

== Summary ==
Competitions were held in fine summer weather which attracted 9,000 spectators to the ground. The prizes were presented by Mrs Wheeler.

The fourteen events on the programme were for men only, with heats and finals all held on the same day, with the exception of the 10 miles race, which was held on the following Monday, 23 June, at the same venue. During the winter of 1883 the ground within the stadium had been levelled and the track relaid at 502 yards 2 feet so that it was three and a half laps to one mile. There were no heats in the field events, some of which had only two or three competitors. It was customary at the time for race winners only to have their performances recorded, therefore, in the tables below other competitors are shown with the distance each man was behind the man in front. Field event performances are shown in feet and inches as they were originally measured, with a conversion to metric measurement in parentheses. Conversions have been obtained using the International Metric Conversion Tables published by the International Amateur Athletics Federation in 1970.

Five American athletes were visiting England at the time but only one of them, William Meek (West Side AC, New York), competed in the championship, winning the 7 miles walk. The other four Americans were guests of South London Harriers and postponed their first appearance in England to a meet where the gate receipts could benefit their hosts. But the Americans were spectators at the championship and were acknowledged by the crowd. They were Arthur Waldron, American champion at 100 yards in 1882 and 1883, Laurence Myers, who held several world records at events up to 880 yards, and Harry Fredericks, who had won the American 1 mile championship in four consecutive years. All of these were from Manhattan AC, and they were joined by F. P. Murray (Williamsburgh AC) a walking champion. They were also accompanied by G. A. Avery, the secretary of Manhattan AC, who was invited to be a timekeeper at the championship.

Public interest in the competitions centred on the meeting of Walter George and William Snook, both of Moseley Harriers. George had broken five world records that summer at distances from 2 miles to 10 miles and was considered virtually unbeatable in that range. The only man capable of challenging him was Snook, who, on the Monday before the championship, had beaten George over 1,500 yards at the Birchfield Harriers Sports in a time that equalled his own British record.

Four events, the 1 mile, 4 miles, 10 miles and 7 miles walk, saw new championship best performances, and the championship best in the 100 yards was equalled for the fifth consecutive year. Walter George's winning time in the 1 mile was a new world record. George was also responsible for three of those championship bests, and for the second time he won four events at the championship. In 1882 he had won the 880 yards, 1 mile, 4 miles and 10 miles championships, and he won the same four events in 1884. The only other man to have won four individual events at the championship is William Snook, who won the 1 mile, 4 miles, 10 miles and steeplechase in 1885 and George remains the only man to have done it twice. James Cowie (London AC) repeated the exceptional feat of winning both the 100 yards and 440 yards championships.

In the 1 mile, Walter George (Moseley H.) took the lead from the start but after sixty yards he was overtaken by William Snook (Moseley H.) with the only other competitor, W. Darlington (Wolverhampton AC), close up in third. They stayed like this until there was slightly more than one lap to go when George shot into the lead and Snook went after him leaving Darlington some way behind. Snook overtook again at the Trinity Road end of the stadium and led around the turn but with 200 yards to go George again overtook and this time made Snook look as though he were standing still. Snook slowed almost to a walk and was almost caught on the line by Darlington while George charged ahead and won by ninety yards.Splits, 1 lap: 71.8, 2:29.8 (78.0), 3:44.8 (75.0), 4:18.4 (33.6).

Only three men started the 4 miles race, and George took the lead just before 2 miles and was never challenged, winning by 300 yards. Splits, 1 mile: Davis 4:54, George 10:00 (5:06), 14:49.2 (4:49.2), 20:17.8 (5:28.6).

Seven men started the 7 miles walk, with Harry Whyatt (Notts Forest FC), the defending champion, quickly assuming the lead. William Meek (West Side AC, New York) took second place and these two gradually moved away from the rest of the field with an eleven second lead after the first mile, by which point two men had retired. Just past two miles Meek made his effort and passed Whyatt and one lap later Whyatt stopped to bathe his face but resumed walking, having lost around twenty yards. At 400 yards past 3 miles Whyatt again stopped, and restarted, two or three times, then finally retired, leaving J. Jervis (Liverpool H.) the only other man in the race. Meek's style received many complements from the spectators and he was applauded for a fine win in fast time. Splits, 1 mile, Meek: 7:03.0, 14:26.5 (7:23.5), 22:05 (7:38.5), 29:51 (7:46), 38:02 (8:11), 46:13 (8:11), 54:27 (8:14), Jervis: 7:18, 14:36 (7:18), 22:42 (8:06), 31:01 (8:19), 39:03 (8:02), 48:35 (9:32), 57:53.2 (9:18.2).

Around 1,000 spectators returned on Monday afternoon for the 10 miles championship where they were disappointed by there being only four competitors. Two of these dropped out by half way, leaving Walter George (Moseley H.) to win easily by two and half laps in a time some three minutes slower than the world record he had set in April. Splits, 1 mile: 5:02, 10:09 (5:07), 15:20 (5:11), 20:37 (5:17), 26:02 (5:25), 31:33 (5:31), 37:09 (5:36), 42:47 (5:38), 48:34 (5:47), 54:02 (5:28); 5 miles: 26:02, 54:02 (28:00).

== Results ==
Event	1st	2nd	3rd
100 yards	(Scotland) James John Milroy Cowie	Charles George Wood	Richard F. Shaw
440 yards	(Scotland) James John Milroy Cowie	Charles George Wood	W. Lock
880 yards	Walter George	John Fillingham Bishop	n/a
1 mile	Walter George	William Snook	W. Darlington
4 miles	Walter George	A. H. Davies	George Slynn
10 miles	Walter George	George Slynn	William J. Lawrence
steeplechase	William Snook	E. Wall	William J. Lawrence
120yd hurdles	Charles Wright Gowthorpe	W. H. Angle	n/a
7 miles walk	(United States) William Henry Meek	James Jervis	Harry Whyatt
high jump	Thomas Ray	Arthur Watkinson	F. W. Cattle
pole jump	Thomas Ray	C. G. Taylor	(Wales) Decimus Cooke
long jump	Ernest W. Horwood	n/a	n/a
shot put	(Leinster) Owen Harte	n/a	n/a
hammer throw	(Leinster) Owen Harte	n/a	n/a

== Event summary ==
100 yards
Pos	Athlete	Club	Time / Dist
1.	James John Milroy Cowie	London AC	10 1/5
2.	Charles George Wood	Blackheath H.	inches
3.	Richard F. Shaw	Hereford FC	3/4 - 1 1/2 yd
4.	W. Livesey	Birchfield H.	1/2 yd

Notes: 2 heats. first two in each heat qualify for the final. N. W. Howard McLean (London AC) was eliminated in heats.

440 yards
Pos	Athlete	Club	Time / Dist
1.	James John Milroy Cowie	London AC	50 2/5
2.	Charles George Wood	London AC	5 yd
3.	W. Lock	Spartan H.	1 ft
4.	John Fillingham Bishop	Notts Forest FC	1/2 yd

Notes: 2 heats. first two in each heat qualify for the final.

880 yards
Pos	Athlete	Club	Time / Dist
1.	Walter Goodall George	Moseley H.	2:02 1/5
2.	John Fillingham Bishop	Notts Forest FC	2:07 4/5

Notes: only 2 competitors. William Birkett (London AC) the holder, entered but did not start.

1 mile
Pos	Athlete	Club	Time / Dist
1.	Walter Goodall George	Moseley H.	4:18 2/5
2.	William Snook	Moseley H.	4:34 2/5
3.	W. Darlington	Wolverhampton AC	inches

Notes: only 3 competitors

4 miles
Pos	Athlete	Club	Time / Dist
1.	Walter Goodall George	Moseley H.	20:12 4/5
2.	A. H. Davies	London AC	20:56 3/5
3.	George Slynn	Birchfield H.	10 yd

Notes: only 3 competitors. time for Davies is sometimes given as 20:51 3/5, the time here is from Buchanan.

10 miles
Pos	Athlete	Club	Time / Dist
1.	Walter Goodall George	Moseley H.	54:02
2.	George Slynn	Birchfield H.	58:04
3.	William J. Lawrence	Moseley H.	ret (5 miles)
4.	W. J. M. Etkins	Birchfield H.	ret (1 mile)

Notes: only 2 finished, held on Monday 23 June

Steeplechase
Pos	Athlete	Club	Time / Dist
1.	William Snook	Moseley H.	10:21
2.	E. Wall	Birchfield H.	10:27
3.	William J. Lawrence	Moseley H.	10:33 4/5

Notes: only 3 competitors

120 yards hurdles
Pos	Athlete	Club	Time / Dist
1.	Charles Wright Gowthorpe	Notts Forest FC	16 3/5
2.	W. H. Angle	Spartan H.	16 yd

Notes: no heats. only 2 competitors. Angle fell at the ninth hurdle.

High Jump
Pos	Athlete	Club	Time / Dist
1.	Thomas Ray	Ulverston AC	5ft 7in (1.70m)
2.	Arthur Watkinson	Hull AC	5ft 6in (1.67m)
3.	F. W. Cattle	St Thomas’s Hospital AC	5ft 6in (1.67m)
4.	Decimus Cooke	Wrexham	5ft 3in (1.60m)

Notes: only 4 competitors. 2nd place decided by a jump-off

Pole Jump
Pos	Athlete	Club	Time / Dist
1.	Thomas Ray	Ulverston AC	10ft 10in (3.30m)
2.	C. G. Taylor	HMS Marlborough, Portsmouth	10ft 2in (3.10m)
3.	Decimus Cooke	Wrexham	10ft 0in (3.05m)
4.	J. O. Dicker	London AC	

Notes: Ray was declared the winner after clearing 10ft 4in (3.15m), but went on to clear 10ft 10in (3.30m)

Long Jump
Pos	Athlete	Club	Time / Dist
1.	Ernest W. Horwood	Blackheath H.	21ft 9in (6.63m)

Notes: only 1 competitor

Shot Put
Pos	Athlete	Club	Time / Dist
1.	Owen Harte	Ireland	39ft 10in (12.14m)

Notes: only 1 competitor. Owen Harte was a member of the Royal Irish Constabulary, based in Dublin and the Wexford Harbour Boat Club.

Hammer
Pos	Athlete	Club	Time / Dist
1.	Owen Harte	Ireland	83ft 5in (25.42m)

Notes: only 1 competitor.

7 miles walk
Pos	Athlete	Club	Time / Dist
1.	William Henry Meek	West Side AC, New York	54:27
2.	James Jervis	Liverpool H.	57:53
3.	Harry Whyatt	Notts Forest F.C.	(ret 13 laps)
	C. B. Irwin	Dundalk F.C.	(ret)
	H. Webster	New Ferry, Cheshire	(ret)
	J Harvie	Queens Park F.C.	ret (4 laps)
	J. A. Morgan	Portsmouth H.	(disq)

Notes: 7 starters, only 2 finished. The Field gives the winner 54:20, the time here is from Buchanan. the holder, Harry Whyatt (Notts Forest FC) retired after 3 miles and 1 lap.

Championship best performance
Event	Athlete	Time / Dist	Year
100 yards	William Page Phillips (London AC)	10 1/5	1880
	William Page Phillips (London AC)	10 1/5	1882
	James John Milroy Cowie (London AC)	10 1/5	1883
	James John Milroy Cowie (London AC)	10 1/5	1884
440 yards	Henry Rawlins Ball (London AC)	50 1/5	1882
880 yards	William Birkett (London AC)	1:58	1883
1 mile	Walter Goodall George (Moseley H.)	4:18 2/5	1884
4 miles	Walter Goodall George (Moseley H.)	20:12 4/5	1884
10 miles	Walter Goodall George (Moseley H.)	54:02	1884
120 yards hurdles	Samuel Palmer (Cambridge Un. AC)	16 1/5	1883
High jump	Patrick Davin (Ireland)	6ft 1/2in (1.84m)	1881
Pole jump	Thomas Ray (Ulverston CC)	11ft 3in (3.43m)	1881
Long jump	John Whitehill Parsons (Edinburgh H.)	23ft 0 1/4in (7.01m)	1883
Shot put	George McKenzie Ross (Patricroft)	42ft 4in (12.90m)	1882
Hammer	John D. Gruer (Scottish Club)	101ft 2 1/2in (30.84m)	1883
7 miles walk	William Henry Meek (West Side AC, New York)	54:27	1884

"Notes:" Performances in the Steeplechase are not comparable until the event was standardised in the 1930s.
