= List of British champions in 10 miles =

The British 10 miles athletics champions covers the AAA Championships from 1880-1972. The event was discontinued after 1972.

Where an international athlete won the AAA Championships the highest ranking UK athlete is considered the National Champion in this list.

== Past winners ==
AAC Championships 10 miles, men's event only
Year	Men's champion
1879	Charlie Mason

AAA Championships 10 miles, men's event only
Year	Men's champion
1880	Charlie Mason
1881	George Dunning
1882	Walter George
1883	William Snook
1884	Walter George
1885	William Snook
1886	William Coad
1887	A. Houlding
1888	Edward Parry
1889	Sidney Thomas
1890	James Kibblewhite
1891	William Morton
1892	Sidney Thomas
1893	Sidney Thomas
1894	Sidney Thomas
1895	Fred Bacon
1896	George Crossland
1897	Alfred Tysoe
1898	Sidney Robinson
1899	Charles Bennett
1900	Sidney Robinson
1901	Alfred Shrubb
1902	Alfred Shrubb
1903	Alfred Shrubb
1904	Alfred Shrubb
1905	Albert Aldridge
1906	Albert Aldridge
1907	Adam Underwood
1908	Alexander Duncan
1909	A. Edward Wood
1910	William Scott
1911	William Scott
1912	William Scott
1913	Ernest Glover
1914	Thomas Fennah
1919	Joe Blewitt
1920	Charles Clibbon
1921	Halland Britton
1922	Halland Britton
1923	Ernie Harper
1924	Halland Britton
1925	Jack Webster
1926	Ernie Harper
1927	Ernie Harper
1928	Jack Webster
1929	Ernie Harper
1930	Jack Winfield
1931	Jack Winfield
1932	James Wood
1933	George Bailey
1934	Jack Holden
1935	Frank Marsland
1936	William Eaton
1937	Reginald Walker
1938	Reginald Draper
1939	Lawrence Weatherill
1947	Jim Peters
1958	Frederick Norris
1959	Frederick Norris
1960	Basil Heatley
1961	Basil Heatley
1962	Mel Batty
1963	Mel Batty
1964	Mel Batty
1965	Ron Hill
1966	Ron Hill
1967	Ron Hill
1968	Ron Hill
1969	Ron Hill
1970	Trevor Wright
1971	Trevor Wright
1972	Bernie Plain

DISCONTINUED
