= List of British champions in 800 metres =

The list of British 800 metres athletics champions covers four competitions;

- the Amateur Athletic Club Championships (1866-1879)
- the AAA Championships (1880-2006),
- the UK Athletics Championships which existed from 1977 until 1993, with a single further event in 1997, and ran concurrently with the AAA Championships.
- the current British Athletics Championships which was founded in 2007,

== Background ==
The AAA Championships were open to international athletes but a guest international was not considered the National Champion in this list if they won the relevant Championship, that title going to the highest placed British athlete in the event. Despite this, the AAA Championships were regarded as more prestigious than the British-only UK Championships event for most of the latter's existence, although both were recognised as national championships. The UK Championships were ended in 1997, while the AAA Championships were supplanted by the British Athletics Championships in 2007. While the AAA Championships continue, they are no longer regarded as crowning a British champion.

Michael Rimmer with seven titles, and Diane Modahl née Edwards and Kelly Holmes, with eight titles each, are the most successful British athletes in the history of the event domestically.

== Past winners ==
AAC Championships 880 yards, mens event only
Year	Men's champion
1866	Percy Thornton
1867	William Frere
1868	Edward Colbeck
1869	Robert Somers-Smith
1870	Robert Somers-Smith ^{(2)}
1871	Arthur Pelham
1872	Thomas Christie / George Templer
1873	Arthur Pelham ^{(2)}
1874	Edward Sandford
1875	Edward Sandford ^{(2)}
1876	Frederick Elborough
1877	Frederick Elborough ^{(2)}
1878	Henry Whately / Lees Knowles
1879	William Bolton / Charles Hazen-Wood

AAA Championships 880 yards, men's event only
Year	Men's champion
1880	Samuel Holman
1881	Sidney Baker
1882	Walter George
1883	William Birkett
1884	Walter George ^{(2)}
1885	G.W. Wathen
1886	Ernest Robinson
1887	Francis Cross
1888	Alfred Le Maitre
1889	Henry Tindall
1890	Thomas Pitman
1891	William Holmes
1892	William Holmes ^{(2)}
1893	Edgar Bredin
1894	Edgar Bredin
1895	Edgar Bredin ^{(3)}
1896	William King
1897	Albert Relf
1898	Albert Relf ^{(2)}
1899	Alfred Tysoe
1900	Alfred Tysoe ^{(2)}
1901	John Cleave
1902	Arthur Manning
1903	Bernard Blunden
1904	Herbert Workman
1905	Bernard Blunden ^{(2)}
1906	Arthur Astley
1907	Ivo Fairbairn-Crawford
1908	Theodore Just
1909	Arthur Astley ^{(2)}
1910	Eddie Owen
1911	NBA
1912	James Soutter
1913	Cyril Frisby
1914	Albert Hill
1919	Albert Hill
1920	Albert Hill ^{(3)}
1921	Edgar Mountain

AAA Championships & WAAA Championships
Year	Men's champion	Year	Women's champion
880 yards
1922	Edgar Mountain ^{(2)}	1922	Mary Lines
1923	Cecil Griffiths	1923	Edith Trickey
1924	Henry Stallard	1924	Edith Trickey
1925	Cecil Griffiths ^{(2)}	1925	Edith Trickey
1926	Dougles Lowe	1926	Edith Trickey
1927	Dougles Lowe	1927	Edith Trickey ^{(5)}
1928	Dougles Lowe ^{(3)}	1928	Ivy Barber
1929	Cyril Ellis	1929	Violet Streater
1930	Tommy Hampson	1930	Gladys Lunn
1931	Tommy Hampson	1931	Gladys Lunn
1932	Tommy Hampson ^{(3)}	1932	Gladys Lunn
1933	Clifford Whitehead	1933	Ruth Christmas
1934	Jack Cooper	1934	Gladys Lunn
1935	James Stothard	1935	Nellie Halstead
1936	Jack Powell	1936	Olive Hall
1937	Arthur Collyer	1937	Gladys Lunn ^{(5)}
1938	Arthur Collyer ^{(2)}	1938	Nellie Halstead ^{(2)}
1939	Godfrey Brown	1939	Olive Hall ^{(2)}
1945	nc	1945	Phyllis Richards
1946	Tom White	1946	Phyllis Richards ^{(2)}
1947	Tom White ^{(2)}	1947	Nellie Batson
1948	John Parlett	1948	Nellie Batson
1949	John Parlett ^{(2)}	1949	Hazel Spears
1950	Roger Bannister	1950	Margaret Hume
1951	Frank Evans	1951	Nellie Batson ^{(3)}
1952	Roger Bannister ^{(2)}	1952	Margaret Taylor
1953	Brian Hewson	1953	Anne Oliver
1954	Brian Hewson	1954	Diane Leather
1955	Derek Johnson	1955	Diane Leather
1956	Mike Rawson	1956	Phyllis Perkins
1957	Mike Rawson ^{(2)}	1957	Diane Leather ^{(3)}
1958	Brian Hewson	1958	Joy Jordan
1959	Brian Hewson ^{(4)}	1959	Joy Jordan
1960	Tom Farrell	1960	Joy Jordan
1961	Tony Harris	1961	Joy Jordan
1962	Sid Purkis	1962	Joy Jordan ^{(5)}
1963	NBA	1963	Phyllis Perkins ^{(2)}
1964	Chris Carter	1964	Anne Smith
1965	Chris Carter	1965	Anne Smith
1966	Chris Carter ^{(3)}	1966	Anne Smith
1967	John Boulter	1967	Anne Smith ^{(4)}
1968	John Davies	1968	Lillian Board
800 metres - metrification
1969	Dave Cropper	1969	Pat Lowe
1970	Andy Carter	1970	Sheila Carey
1971	Peter Browne	1971	Rosemary Stirling
1972	Andy Carter	1972	Pat Cropper ^{(2)}
1973	Andy Carter ^{(3)}	1973	Rosemary Wright ^{(2)}
1974	Steve Ovett	1974	Lesley Kiernan
1975	Steve Ovett	1975	Angela Creamer
1976	Steve Ovett ^{(3)}	1976	Angela Creamer ^{(2)}

AAA Championships/WAAA Championships & UK Athletics Championships dual championships era 1977-1987
Year	AAA Men	Year	WAAA Women	Year	UK Men	UK Women
1977	Sebastian Coe	1977	Christina Boxer	1977	Dave Warren	Lesley Kiernan
1978	Dave Warren	1978	Christina Boxer	1978	Sebastian Coe	Jane Colebrook
1979	Garry Cook	1979	Christine Benning	1979	Dane Joseph	Christina Boxer
1980	Paul Forbes	1980	Anne Clarkson	1980	Dave Warren ^{(2)}	Christina Boxer ^{(2)}
1981	Sebastian Coe ^{(2)}	1981	Anne Clarkson ^{(2)}	1981	Rob Harrison	Gillian Dainty
1982	Peter Elliott	1982	Lorraine Baker	1982	Paul Forbes	Anne Clarkson
1983	Peter Elliott	1983	Shireen Bailey	1983	Peter Elliott	Shireen Bailey
1984	Steve Cram	1984	Christina Boxer	1984	Peter Elliott ^{(2)}	Christina Boxer ^{(3)}
1985	John Gladwin	1985	Christina Boxer ^{(4)}	1985	Tom McKean	Liz MacArthur
1986	Steve Cram	1986	Diane Edwards	1986	Peter Elliott ^{(3)}	Anne Purvis ^{(2)}
1987	Peter Elliott ^{(3)}	1987	Diane Edwards	1987	John Gladwin	Diane Edwards

AAA Championships & UK Athletics Championships dual championships era 1988-1997
Year	Men AAA	Women AAA	Year	Men UK	Women UK
1988	Steve Cram ^{(3)}	Kirsty Wade	1988	Paul Herbert	Christina Cahill ^{(4)}
1989	Ikem Billy	Diane Edwards	1989	Nick Smith	Ann Williams
1990	Tom McKean	Ann Williams	1990	Ann Williams	Helen Thorpe
1991	Tom McKean ^{(2)}	Paula Fryer	1991	David Sharpe	Paula Fryer
1992	Curtis Robb	Diane Edwards	1992	Curtis Robb	Lynne Robinson
1993	Martin Steele	Kelly Holmes	1993	Martin Steele	Kelly Holmes
1994	Craig Winrow	Diane Modahl (née Modahl)	n/a		
1995	Curtis Robb	Kelly Holmes	n/a		
1996	Curtis Robb ^{(3)}	Kelly Holmes	n/a		
1997	Noel Edwards	Amanda Crowe	1997	Andy Hart	Kelly Holmes ^{(4)}

AAA Championships second era 1998-2006
Year	Men's champion	Women's champion
1998	Jason Lobo	Diane Modahl ^{(6)}
1999	Mark Sesay	Kelly Holmes
2000	James McIlroy	Kelly Holmes
2001	Neil Speaight	Kelly Holmes
2002	James McIlroy ^{(2)}	Susan Scott
2003	Ricky Soos	Lucy Vaughan
2004	Sam Ellis	Kelly Holmes ^{(7)}
2005	Tim Bayley	Susan Scott ^{(2)}
2006	Michael Rimmer	Becky Lyne

British Athletics Championships 2007 to present
Year	Men's champion	Women's champion
2007	Michael Rimmer	Jemma Simpson
2008	Michael Rimmer	Marilyn Okoro
2009	Michael Rimmer	Jemma Simpson
2010	Michael Rimmer	Jemma Simpson ^{(3)}
2011	Andrew Osagie	Jenny Meadows
2012	Andrew Osagie ^{(2)}	Lynsey Sharp
2013	Michael Rimmer	Marilyn Okoro ^{(2)}
2014	Michael Rimmer ^{(7)}	Lynsey Sharp
2015	Kyle Langford	Lynsey Sharp ^{(3)}
2016	Elliot Giles	Shelayna Oskan-Clarke
2017	Elliot Giles	Shelayna Oskan-Clarke
2018	Elliot Giles	Laura Muir
2019	Spencer Thomas	Shelayna Oskan-Clarke ^{(3)}
2020	Daniel Rowden	Keely Hodgkinson
2021	Elliot Giles ^{(4)}	Keely Hodgkinson
2022	Max Burgin	Jemma Reekie
2023	Daniel Rowden ^{(2)}	Keely Hodgkinson ^{(3)}
2024	Ben Pattison	Phoebe Gill
2025	Max Burgin ^{(2)}	Georgia Hunter Bell
2026	Jake Wightman	Georgia Hunter Bell ^{(2)}

- NBA = No British athlete in final
- nc = not contested

=== Most titles ===
('AAA continuity' only; athletes in bold still active)

800 metres - most titles
Titles	Men	Women
7	Michael Rimmer (2006-10, 2012-13)	Kelly Holmes (1993, 1995-96, 1999-2001, 2004)
6		Diane Modahl (1986-87, 1989, 1992, 1994, 1998)
5		Edith Trickey (1923-27); Gladys Lunn (1930-32, 1934, 1937); Joy Jordan (1958-62)
4	**Elliot Giles** (2016-18, 20121); Brian Hewson (1953-54, 1958-59)	Anne Smith (1964-67); Christina Boxer (1977-78, 1984-85)
3	10 athletes	6 athletes (2 active)
