= 1883 AAA Championships =

Outdoor track and field competition

- Dates: 30 June
- Host city: London, England
- Venue: Lillie Bridge Grounds
- Level: Senior
- Type: Outdoor
- Events: 14

The 1883 AAA Championships was an outdoor track and field competition organised by the Amateur Athletic Association (AAA), held on Saturday 30 June at Lillie Bridge Grounds, London, England.

== Summary ==
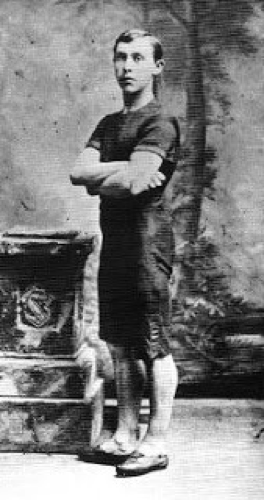
William Snook won three titles

Competitions commenced at three o'clock in glorious summer weather, and by the time of the 7 miles walk it was described as "blazing hot." Wellington's Light Cavalry Band played musical selections throughout the afternoon, and at the conclusion of the sports the prizes were presented by the Countess of Jersey, wife of the Earl of Jersey, President of the AAA.

The fourteen events on the programme were for men only, with heats and finals all held on the same day, with the exception of the 10 miles race, which was held on the following Monday, 2 July, at the same venue. The track was one-third of a mile (586 yards 2 feet) in circumference with one long straight and three bends. There were no heats in the field events, some of which had only two or three competitors. It was customary at the time for race winners only to have their performances recorded, therefore, in the tables below other competitors are shown with the distance each man was behind the man in front. Field event performances are shown in feet and inches as they were originally measured, with a conversion to metric measurement in parentheses. Conversions have been obtained using the International Metric Conversion Tables published by the International Amateur Athletics Federation in 1970.

There were only two foreign entries this year. Prosper Hendricks of Société Gymnastique in Brussels, Belgium, was entered in the 100 yards and 440 yards. Belgium did not have national championships until 1889 and Hendricks came to England as a complete unknown. He ran in ordinary running flats rather than "pumps" as spikes were known at the time, and although he reached the final of the 100 yards he did not distinguish himself in either event. W. S. Hart of Manhattan AC, New York, competed in the seven miles walk but was disqualified before completing two miles.

Notable absences included Thomas Ray (Ulverston AC), who had set a world record in the pole jump earlier in the summer and was expected to appear, and Patrick Davin of Ireland, who had entered the high jump but did not compete. Walter George (Moseley Harriers), was the reigning champion in four events, and chose to defend three of them (880 yards, 1 mile, 4 miles). In two of those races he was challenged by William Snook, known as the "little wonder", who had run fast times earlier in the summer, and their contests were predicted to be a high point of the championship.

Four events, 880 yards, 120 yards hurdles, long jump and hammer, saw championship best performances, while the 100 yards saw the championship best equalled for the fourth consecutive year. In winning the high jump John Parsons of Edinburgh University became the first Scottish athlete to clear six feet (1.83m). John Gruer's winning performance in the hammer was a world record, adding 2 ft 4 1/2in (0.72m) to the record established by Maurice Davin at these championships in 1881.

William Page Phillips (London AC) had won the 100 yards and finished second in the 440 yards in each of the three previous championships. In 1883 he did not contest the 100 yards which was won by James Cowie (London AC) who equalled the championship best of 10 1/5 seconds and also achieved the rare distinction of winning both the 100 yards and 440 yards in the same year. The only other man to achieve this is Reg Wadlsey (Highgate Harriers) in 1899. In 1923 and 1924 Eric Liddell (Edinburgh Un. AC) won both events, but only one event in each year.

In the 880 yards Thomas Bryden (Clapham Rovers FC) took the early lead and at 440 yards, reached in 56 2/5, he led by eight yards from Walter George (Moseley H.) and William Birkett (London AC). As they rounded the bend at the southern end of the stadium, referred to as the Hospital End because it was adjacent to a smallpox hospital, George spurted and Bryden was quickly overhauled. With 200 yards to go Birkett overtook Bryden and caught George, then for a few yards they ran side by side but turning into the finishing straight Birkett edged ahead and won by eight yards.

W. S. Hart (Manhattan AC, New York) led the 7 miles walk for the first mile, and after one more lap he was disqualified. This left W. H. Smith (Knightley FC) in the lead where he stayed for the next three miles. At that point Harry Whyatt (Notts Forest FC) caught him up and they went together for one lap but Whyatt edged ahead and by 5 miles was 36 seconds ahead. After one more mile Smith retired leaving Whyatt a large safety margin over the only two competitors left in the race. splits, 1 mile, Whyatt: 7:09, 15:22.5 (8:13.5), 23:40.5 (8:18.0), 32:04.0 (8:23.5), 40:44 (8:40), 49:12 (8:28), 59:15 (10:03).

The final of the 120 yards hurdles had to be run twice. There were six entrants divided into two heats, with the first two in each heat qualifying for the final. Duncan Moul (London AC) and Ernest Lloyd (Clapton Lacrosse Club) were eliminated at this stage leaving four men in the final to be run at 4.45. W. A. Jeffries (London AC) fell at the eighth hurdle, while Samuel Palmer (Cambridge Un. AC) led at the final hurdle but was caught on the line by William Pollock (St George's Hospital AC) and the result was declared a dead heat with Charles Lockton (London AC) a distant third. The deciding tie was won in a new championship best time by Palmer who hurdled "like a deer" and left Pollock a yard and a half behind.

The 1 mile had been a highly anticipated duel between two of the fastest milers in the world at that time. But Walter George (Moseley H.), the world record holder, was clearly not at his best and William Snook simply took the lead from the gun and then responded swiftly to every move George made to overtake and won easily by eight yards. Snook ran the first quarter mile in 65 seconds and reached half way in 2:09 4/5. The times for his three laps were as follows: 1:25, 2:55 3/5 (1:30 3/5), 4:25 4/5 (1:30 1/5).

Ten men started the 4 miles, but half of them dropped out. William Snook (Moseley H.) took the lead through one mile (4:54) when Walter George (Moseley H.) took the lead and these two gradually eased away from the rest of the field with George in front and Snook on his shoulder. Entering the final lap there was a little bit of jostling between them and George speeded up to escape any trouble, but it soon became apparent that he had shot his bolt and Snook reeled him in and got past and won by nearly thirty yards. lap times: 1:30.8, 3:10.2 (1:39.4), 4:54 (1:43.8), 6:36 (1:42), 8:22 (1:46), 10:08 (1:46), 11:55 (1:47), 13:42 (1:47), 15:30 (1:48), 17:18 (1:48), 19:06 (1:48), 20:37 (1:31); splits, 1 mile: 4:54, 10:08 (5:14), 15:30 (5:22), 20:37 (5:07).

The 10 miles was contested on Monday evening starting at 6.45, fifteen minutes later than advertised. Five men started but two of them dropped out before reaching half way. William Snook (Moseley H.) was always at the front and from five miles was on his own, winning by a little more than 200 yards. John Dixon (South London H.) who finished third, was almost lapped. splits, 1 mile: 5:03, 10:32 (5:29), 16:18 (5:46), 22:11 (5:53), 28:06 (5:55), 33:55 (5:49), 39:59 (6:04), 45:43 (5:44), 51:51 (6:08), 57:41 (5:50); 5 miles: 28:06, 57:41.0 (29:35).

== Results ==
Event	1st	2nd	3rd
100 yards	(Scotland) James John Milroy Cowie	Herbert Chadwick	C. Y. Bedford
440 yards	(Scotland) James John Milroy Cowie	William Page Phillips	J. P. Muspratt
880 yards	William Birkett	Walter George	Thomas Radford Bryden
1 mile	William Snook	Walter George	Thomas Radford Bryden
4 miles	William Snook	Walter George	George E. Lidiard
10 miles	William Snook	George E. Lidiard	John Edwin Dixon
steeplechase	Thomas Thornton	James Ogden	
120yd hurdles	Samuel Palmer	William Rivers Pollock	Charles Langton Lockton
7 miles walk	Harry Whyatt	J. Pritchard	George Philip Beckley
high jump	(Scotland) John Whitehill Parsons	(Wales) R. F. Houghton	n/a
pole jump	H. J. Cobbold	n/a	n/a
long jump	(Scotland) John Whitehill Parsons	Ernest W. Horwood	Charles Langton Lockton
shot put	(Leinster) Owen Harte	(Scotland) Donald J. Mackinnon	Alfred Robert Sieveking
hammer throw	(Scotland) John D. Gruer	(Scotland) Donald J. Mackinnon	(Leinster) Owen Harte

== Event summary ==
100 yards
Pos	Athlete	Club	Time / Dist
1.	James John Milroy Cowie	London AC	10 1/5
2.	Herbert Chadwick	Birchfield H.	1 1/2 yd
3.	C. Y. Bedford	London AC	1 yd
4.	N. W. Howard McLean	London AC	2 yd
5.	Prosper Hendricks	Societe Gymnastique Bruussels, Belgium	"simply nowhere"

Notes: no heats.

440 yards
Pos	Athlete	Club	Time / Dist
1.	James John Milroy Cowie	London AC	51sec.
2.	William Page Phillips	London AC	2 yd
3.	J. P. Muspratt	London AC	10 yd

Notes: 2 heats, first two in each heat qualified for the final. Henry Ball (London AC), the defending champion, qualified for the final but did not finish.

880 yards
Pos	Athlete	Club	Time / Dist
1.	William Birkett	London AC	1:58
2.	Walter Goodall George	Moseley H.	1:58 2/5
3.	Thomas Radford Bryden	Clapham Rovers FC	20 yd
4.	H. T. Chalon	London AC	
5.	W. Lock	Spartan H.	

Notes: George's time is sometimes given as 1:58 4/5. Bryden and Chalon beat standard time of 2:02

1 mile
Pos	Athlete	Club	Time / Dist
1.	William Snook	Moseley H.	4:25 4/5
2.	Walter Goodall George	Moseley H.	4:26 3/5
3.	Thomas Radford Bryden	Clapham Rovers FC	4:31 2/5
4.	W. T. Etkins	Birchfield H.	
5.	J. G. Clabburn	London AC	
6.	F. Woolnaugh	Clapton Beagles	

Notes: ...

4 miles
Pos	Athlete	Club	Time / Dist
1.	William Snook	Moseley H.	20:37
2.	Walter Goodall George	Moseley H.	20:44
3.	George E. Lidiard	London AC	21:29
4.	C. Catlin	Blackheath H.	21:35
5.	John Edwin Dixon	South London H.	22:09

Notes: John Dixon later changed his name to Fowler-Dixon

10 miles
Pos	Athlete	Club	Time / Dist
1.	William Snook	Moseley H.	57:41
2.	George E. Lidiard	London AC	58:37 3/5
3.	John Edwin Dixon	London AC	59:37

Notes: Lillie Bridge, 2 July, only 3 finished

Steeplechase
Pos	Athlete	Club	Time / Dist
1.	Thomas Thornton	Birchfield H.	11:40 1/5
2.	James Ogden	Birchfield H.	25 yds

Notes: only 2 finished

120 yards hurdles
Pos	Athlete	Club	Time / Dist
1.	Samuel Palmer	Cambridge Un. AC	16 1/5
2.	William Rivers Pollock	St George's Hospital AC	1 1/2 yd
3.	Charles Langton Lockton	London AC	

Notes: 2 heats, first two in each heat qualify for the final.

High Jump
Pos	Athlete	Club	Time / Dist
1.	John Whitehill Parsons	Fettesian-Lorettonian / Edinburgh Un. AC	6 ft 0 1/4in (1.83m)
2.	R. F. Houghton	Newport FC	5 ft 8in (1.72m)

Notes: only 2 competitors

Pole Jump
Pos	Athlete	Club	Time / Dist
1.	H. J. Cobbold	Felixstowe CC	9 ft 6in (2.89m)

Notes: only 1 competitor

Long Jump
Pos	Athlete	Club	Time / Dist
1.	John Whitehill Parsons	Fettesian-Lorettonian / Edinburgh H.	23 ft 0 1/4in (7.01m)
2.	Ernest W. Horwood	Blackheath H.	21 ft 11 1/2in (6.69m)
3.	Charles Langton Lockton	London AC	20 ft 11 1/2in (6.39m)
4.	R. F. Hougton	Moseley H.	
5.	P. H. Hendricks	Belgium	

Notes: 5 competitors. the world record at this point was 23 ft 1 1/2in (7.05m).

Shot Put
Pos	Athlete	Club	Time / Dist
1.	Owen Harte	Dublin R.I.C, Ireland	41 ft 1in (12.52m)
2.	Donald J. Mackinnon	London Scottish FC	39 ft 2in (11.94m)
3.	Alfred Robert Sieveking	St Mary's Hospital AC	36 ft 2in (11.02m)
4.	William Young Winthrop	London AC	

Notes: Owen Harte was a member of the Royal Irish Constabulary, based in Dublin.

Hammer
Pos	Athlete	Club	Time / Dist
1.	John D. Gruer	Scottish Club	101 ft 2 1/2in (30.84m)
2.	Donald J. Mackinnon	London Scottish RFC	92 ft 2in (28.10m)
3.	Owen Harte	Dublin R.I.C, Ireland	91 ft 5in (27.86m)
4.	William Young Winthrop	London AC	
5.	Walter Lawrence	London AC	

Notes: only 5 competitors

7 miles walk
Pos	Athlete	Club	Time / Dist
1.	Harry Whyatt	Notts Forest FC	59:15
2.	J. Pritchard	Birchfield H.	59:20
3.	George Philip Beckley	London AC	59:55

Notes: 7 competitors but only 3 finished

Championship best performance
Event	Athlete	Time / Dist	Year
100 yards	William Page Phillips (London AC)	10 1/5	1880
	William Page Phillips (London AC)	10 1/5	1882
	James John Milroy Cowie (London AC)	10 1/5	1883
440 yards	Henry Rawlins Ball (London AC)	50 1/5	1882
880 yards	William Birkett (London AC)	1:58	1883
1 mile	Bernhard Wise (Australia / Oxford Un. AC)	4:24 2/5	1881
4 miles	George Morley Nehan (Blackheath H.)	20:26 1/5	1881
10 miles	George Augustus Dunning (Clapton Beagles)	54:34	1881
120 yards hurdles	Samuel Palmer (Cambridge Un. AC)	16 1/5	1883
High jump	Patrick Davin (Ireland)	6 ft 1/2in (1.84m)	1881
Pole jump	Thomas Ray (Ulverston CC)	11 ft 3in (3.43m)	1881
Long jump	John Whitehill Parsons (Edinburgh H.)	23 ft 0 1/4in (7.01m)	1883
Shot put	George McKenzie Ross (Patricroft)	42 ft 4in (12.90m)	1882
Hammer	John D. Gruer (Scottish Club)	101 ft 2 1/2in (30.84m)	1883
7 miles walk	John W. Raby (Elland)	54:48 2/5	1881

"Notes:" Performances in the Steeplechase are not comparable until the event was standardised in the 1930s.
