= 1882 AAA Championships =

Outdoor track and field competition

- Dates: 1 July
- Host city: Stoke-on-Trent, England
- Venue: Stoke Victoria AC Grounds
- Level: Senior
- Type: Outdoor
- Events: 14

The 1882 AAA Championships was an outdoor track and field competition organised by the Amateur Athletic Association (AAA), held on Saturday 1 July at Stoke Victoria AC Grounds, Stoke-on-Trent, England. For the second consecutive year the championship was held outside of London.

== Summary ==
The weather in Stoke was fine without being too warm, and there was an almost entire absence of wind. But only almost, the final of the 100 yards was run into a slight headwind. Rain, that had threatened all afternoon, held off until the prizegiving when a few spots of rain fell. The prizes were presented by Mr. C. M. Campbell, the Mayor of Stoke. Crowds were much smaller than last year, with an estimated 4,000 spectators on the first day and around 800 on Monday for the ten miles.

The programme of events was the same as last year with fourteen events for men only. The heats and finals all took place on one day with the exception of the 10 miles race which took place on the following Monday, 3 July, at the same venue.

The track of the Stoke Victoria Athletic Club was a cinder path of 503 yards per lap, making it three and a half laps to one mile. The stadium layout included a separate straight sprint track, with a covered grandstand running the full length of the sprint track. The hurdles were set up on the grass infield, which was not considered up to championship standard and was thought to be in need of some watering and rolling. The start of the first event was delayed for half an hour by the absence of a pistol, and this point together with the condition of the infield, the lack of local advertising that had suppressed the attendance, these all reflected badly on the local organising committee.

There were no foreign competitors among the entries. The Davin brothers from Ireland, who had greatly enhanced the championship in the past two years, did not appear. There was only one entry from Scotland, F. G. Westenra (Edinburgh Un. AC), and he did not appear, preferring instead to contest the Edinburgh University championship at Corstorphine the same day, where he finished second in the 100 yards.

Competition in the middle and long distance running events was focussed on Walter George of Moseley Harriers who had that summer broken six world records at distances from 1 mile to ten miles. He was entered in five events, and won four of them. In the 2 miles steeplechase he retired after losing a shoe in the water jump on the second lap, while in third place.Three events, the 440 yards, 880 yards, and shot put, saw new championship best performances, while the 100 yards saw the championship best equalled for the third consecutive year, and had the same champion in each of those years.

William Page Phillips of London AC, the defending champion, was only second in his heat of the 100 yards. There were several false starts in the final, but when they finally got away Phillips made no mistake and led from the gun. At half way he was one yard clear and James Cowie, also of London AC, closed very quickly but Phillips held him off and won by half a yard.

Phillips also finished second in the 440 yards for the third consecutive year. In 1880 he was beaten by Montague Shearman, in 1881 by Lawrence Myers, and in 1882 by the relatively unknown Henry Ball of London AC. There were only three competitors who contested a straight final. From the gun Ball established a lead with C. S. Johnstone (Moseley H.) in second place and Phillips third. At 300 yards Phillips was fifteen yards in arrears, but then he started to move up and passed Johnstone at the 100 yard mark and closed on Ball who was visibly tiring. But he had left himself too much to do and at the finish was five yards behind Ball who set a championship best time for the event.

Walter George won the 1 mile without being pressed and simply did as little as necessary to win. His next event was the 880 yards. W. R. Cook (Llandudno AC) led for the first 400 yards, then George went to the front, closely followed by John Sadler (London AC). In the next 200 yards George extended his lead to ten yards while Thomas Guinness (London AC) moved into second place. George won by twelve yards from Guinness and a fast-finishing W. Lock (Spartan H.) overtook Sadler for third place. George's winning time of 1:58 1/5 was a championship best performance and the first four finishers beat the standard time of 2:02. The four miles was the last event on the Saturday, and George was the only entrant. After he had run one lap the crowd came onto the track and he was forced to stop and declared the winner.

On Monday evening for the 10 miles there were just four entries. Percy Stenning of Thames Hare and Hounds took the lead, followed by Walter George (Moseley H.), William Alexander (Birchfield H.), and William Lawrence of Moseley Harriers. Stenning led through 1 mile in 5:02, and two laps later George went to the front. Then he seemed to change his mind and went back to second place, but one lap later he took the lead and was never again challenged and lapped the rest of the field inside seven miles. George passed 3 miles in 15:47, 4 miles in 21:12, 5 miles in 26:37, and 6 miles in 32:06. Stenning dropped out at eight miles, reached by him in 45:40, when in last place. George went through 8 miles in 43:14, and 9 miles in 49:01. He ran the last seven miles entirely alone and yet his finishing time was only 7 seconds shy of the championship best performance set up by George Dunning of Clapton Beagles in 1881.

There were no heats in the field events, some of which had only two or three competitors. It was customary at the time for race winners only to have their performances recorded, therefore, in the tables below other competitors are shown with the distance each man was behind the man in front. Field event performances are shown in feet and inches as they were originally measured, with a conversion to metric measurement in parentheses. Conversions have been obtained using the International Metric Conversion Tables published by the International Amateur Athletics Federation in 1970.

== Results ==
Event	1st	2nd	3rd
100 yards	William Page Phillips	(Scotland) James John Milroy Cowie	(Leinster) Thomas Michael Malone
440 yards	Henry Rawlins Ball	William Page Phillips	C. S. Johnstone
880 yards	Walter George	Thomas Archibald Guinness	W. Lock
1 mile	Walter George	W. Staniland	n/a
4 miles	Walter George	n/a	n/a
10 miles	Walter George	William J. Lawrence	William Whiteway Alexander
steeplechase	Thomas Crellin	William J. Lawrence	James Ogden
120yd hurdles	Samuel Palmer	Francis John W. Wood	Charles Wright Gowthorpe
7 miles walk	Harry Whyatt	George Phillip Beckley	R. Parry
high jump	(Wales) R. F. Houghton	Francis John W. Wood	n/a
pole jump	Thomas Ray	Edward Aubrey Strachan	n/a
long jump	(Leinster) Thomas Michael Malone	Ernest W. Horwood	Francis John W. Wood
shot put	George McKenzie Ross	(Leinster) Thomas Michael Malone	n/a
hammer throw	Edmund Baddeley	Walter Lawrence	Robert Lindsay

== Event summary ==
100 yards
Pos	Athlete	Club	Time / Dist
1.	William Page Phillips	London AC	10 1/5
2.	James John Milroy Cowie	London AC	1/2 yd
3.	Thomas Michael Malone	County Clare AC, Ireland	2 1/2 - 3 yds
4.	Herbert Chadwick	Rochdale CC	4 - 5 yds

Notes: 2 heats. first two in each heat qualified for the final.

440 yards
Pos	Athlete	Club	Time / Dist
1.	Henry Rawlins Ball	London AC	50 1/5
2.	William Page Phillips	London AC	5 yd
3.	C. S. Johnstone	Moseley H.	5 yd

Notes: no heats. only 2 competitors finished.

880 yards
Pos	Athlete	Club	Time / Dist
1.	Walter George	Moseley H.	1:58 1/5
2.	Thomas Archibald Guinness	London AC	12-15 yd
3.	W. Lock	Spartan H.	3 yd
4.	John Draper Sadler	London AC	1 yd
5.	D. McDonald	New Brighton FC	
6.	W. J. Hogg	Ireland	

Notes: no heats

1 mile
Pos	Athlete	Club	Time / Dist
1.	Walter George	Moseley H.	4:32 4/5
2.	W. Staniland	Lincoln Bicycle Club	4:33 2/5

Notes: only 2 competitors. George took the lead at the start and was never challenged.

4 miles
Pos	Athlete	Club	Time / Dist
1.	Walter George	Moseley H.	

Notes: only 1 competitor, and he only ran 1 lap and was then declared the winner.

10 miles
Pos	Athlete	Club	Time / Dist
1.	Walter George	Moseley H.	54:41.0
2.	William J. Lawrence	Moseley H.	56:57.0
3.	William Whiteway Alexander	Birchfield H.	57:02.0

Notes: held on Monday 3 July, same venue, only 3 finished. Percy Haines Stenning (Thames Hare & Hounds) started but dropped out after completing 8 miles.

Steeplechase
Pos	Athlete	Club	Time / Dist
1.	Thomas Crellin	Liverpool AC	11:13 3/5
2.	William J. Lawrence	Moseley H.	25 yd
3.	James Ogden	Birchfield H.	`a bad third'

Notes: only 3 finished.

120 yards hurdles
Pos	Athlete	Club	Time / Dist
1.	Samuel Palmer	Cambridge Un. AC	16 3/5
2.	Francis John W. Wood	London AC	inches
3.	Charles Wright Gowthorpe	Notts Forest FC	3-5 yd

Notes: no heats. only 3 competitors

High Jump
Pos	Athlete	Club	Time / Dist
1.	R. F. Houghton	Newport FC	5ft 7 1/4in (1.71m)
2.	Francis John W. Wood	London AC	5ft 6 1/4in (1.68m)

Notes: only 2 competitors

Pole jump
Pos	Athlete	Club	Time / Dist
1.	Thomas Ray	Ulverston CC	10ft 6in (3.20m)
2.	Edward Aubrey Strachan	Royal Inniskilling Fusiliers	10ft 3in (3.12m)

Notes: only 2 competitors. Strachan may have cleared 10ft 4in (3.15m)

Long Jump
Pos	Athlete	Club	Time / Dist
1.	Thomas Michael Malone	Ireland	21ft 9 1/2in (6.64m)
2.	Ernest W. Horwood	Marlow FC	21ft 4in (6.50m)
3.	Francis John W. Wood	London AC	20ft 3in (6.17m)
4.	R. F. Houghton	Newport FC	

Notes: only 4 competitors

Shot Put
Pos	Athlete	Club	Time / Dist
1.	George McKenzie Ross	Patricroft	42ft 4in (12.90m)
2.	Thomas Michael Malone	County Clare AC, Ireland	35ft 6in (10.82m)

Notes: only 2 competitors, 7-foot square introduced

Hammer
Pos	Athlete	Club	Time / Dist
1.	Edmund Baddeley	Cambridge Un. AC	96ft 4in (29.36m)
2.	Walter Lawrence	Oxford Un. AC	85ft 9in (26.14m)
3.	Robert Lindsay	Liverpool Police AC	83ft 10in (25.56m)
4.	George McKenzie Ross	Patricroft	

Notes: only 4 competitors. Baddeley's second best throw was 92ft 4in (28.14m).

7 miles walk
Pos	Athlete	Club	Time / Dist
1.	Harry Whyatt	Notts Forest FC	55:56 1/2
2.	George Phillip Beckley	London AC	56:09
3.	R. Parry	Liverpool AC	56:55 1/2
4.	W. Howard	Bromborough CC	57:35
5.	G. Cooper	Norwich	57:58

Notes: 6 starters, only 5 finished. D. L. Morgan (Acock's Green FC) stopped after 1 mile when last.

Championship best performance
Event	Athlete	Time / Dist	Year
100 yards	William Page Phillips (London AC)	10 1/5	1880
	William Page Phillips (London AC)	10 1/5	1882
440 yards	Henry Rawlins Ball (London AC)	50 1/5	1882
880 yards	Walter Goodall George (Moseley H.)	1:58 1/5	1882
1 mile	Bernhard Wise (Australia / Oxford Un. AC)	4:24 2/5	1881
4 miles	George Morley Nehan (Blackheath H.)	20:26 1/5	1881
10 miles	George Augustus Dunning (Clapton Beagles)	54:34	1881
120 yards hurdles	George Patrick Charles Lawrence (Oxford Un. AC)	16 2/5	1880
High jump	Patrick Davin (Ireland)	6ft 1/2in (1.84m)	1881
Pole jump	Thomas Ray (Ulverston CC)	11ft 3in (3.43m)	1881
Long jump	Patrick Davin (Ireland)	22ft 11in (6.98m)	1881
Shot put	George McKenzie Ross (Patricroft)	42ft 4in (12.90m)	1882
Hammer	Maurice Davin (Ireland)	98ft 10in (30.12m)	1881
7 miles walk	John W. Raby (Elland)	54:48 2/5	1881

"Notes:" Performances in the Steeplechase are not comparable until the event was standardised in the 1930s.
