= 1897 AAA Championships =

Outdoor track and field competition

- Dates: 3 July 1897
- Host city: Manchester, England
- Venue: Fallowfield Stadium
- Level: Senior
- Type: Outdoor
- Events: 14

The 1897 AAA Championships was an outdoor track and field competition organised by the Amateur Athletic Association (AAA), held on Saturday 3 July 1897 at the Fallowfield Stadium in Manchester, England, in front of 3,000 spectators.

The 14 events were the same number as in the previous year and all 14 event disciplines remained the same.

Alfred Tysoe won the mile and 10 miles events

== Results ==
Event	Gold		Silver		Bronze	
100 yards	J. H. Palmer	10.8	Henry Woodyatt	1 ft	Jimmy Tremeer	½ yd
440 yards	Samuel Elliott	53.2	E. Harrison Kenyon	1 ft	(Scotland) J. Donaldson	1½ yd
880 yards	Albert Relf	2:00.4	(Leinster) Cyril Dickinson	1½ yd	D. Wentworth	½ yd
1 mile	Alfred Tysoe	4:27.0	Robert Wellin	1 yd	Henry Cullum	10 yd
4 miles	Charles Bennett	20:27.4	C. E. Haydon	1½ yd	Edward Barlow	
10 miles	Alfred Tysoe	55:59.6	Henry Harrison	55:59.8	Edward Barlow	4 yd
steeplechase	George Lee	12:15.4	H. Evans	60 yd	only 2 finished	
120yd hurdles	Alfred Trafford	17.4	(Leinster) I. A. E. Mulligan	3 yd	Henry Coltart	
4 miles walk	William Sturgess	28:24.8	E. J. Topple	29:40.0	M. K. Forrester	29:47.0
high jump	Claude Leggatt	1.753	Robert Perry	1.740	(Scotland) John MacFarlane; Charles Adams	1.702; 1.702
pole jump	James Poole	3.01	Edwin Newby	2.93	(Leinster) Denis Carey	2.89
long jump	Claude Leggatt	6.50	(Leinster) R. D. Barbour	6.31	(Leinster) Tom Donovan	5.97
shot put	(Leinster) Denis Horgan	13.82	(United States) Richard Sheldon	13.54	only 2 competitors	
hammer throw	(Leinster) Tom Kiely	43.42	(Leinster) Denis Horgan	38.62	(United States) Richard Sheldon	31.14
