= Angela Creamer =

British middle-distance runner

Personal information
- Nationality: British (English)
- Born: 30 January 1956 (age 70) Rotherham, England
- Height: 163 cm (5 ft 4 in)
- Weight: 54 kg (119 lb)

Sport
- Sport: Athletics
- Event: Middle-distance running
- Club: Rotherham Harriers & AC

Angela Mary Creamer (born 30 January 1956) is a British retired middle-distance runner who competed at the 1976 Summer Olympics.

== Biography ==
Creamer became the British 800 metres champion after winning the British WAAA Championships title at the 1975 WAAA Championships and retained the title the following year at the 1976 WAAA Championships.

At the 1976 Olympics Games in Montreal, she represented Great Britain in the women's 800 metres competition. She achieved a Personal Best in her heat.

Angela now lives in Manchester with her husband, Bruce. She has three children, Jack, Harry and Rachel, and two grandchildren.
