= 1899 AAA Championships =

Outdoor track and field competition

- Dates: 1 July 1899
- Host city: Wolverhampton, England
- Venue: Molineux Grounds
- Level: Senior
- Type: Outdoor
- Events: 14

The 1899 AAA Championships was the 1899 edition of the annual outdoor track and field competition organised by the Amateur Athletic Association (AAA). It was held on Saturday 1 July 1899 at the Molineux Grounds in Wolverhampton, England, in front of 5,000 spectators.

The 14 events were the same number as in the previous year and all 14 event disciplines remained the same.

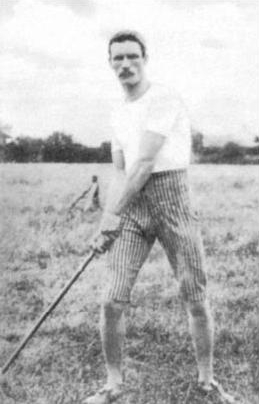
Tom Kiely won his third consecutive hammer title

== Results ==
Event	Gold		Silver		Bronze	
100 yards	Reginald Wadsley	10.2	Claude Jupp	½ yd	Frederick Cooper	2 yd
440 yards	Reginald Wadsley	54.6	Herbert Pride-Jones	2 ft	Charles Sheppard	5 yd
880 yards	Alfred Tysoe	1:58.6	William Lutyens	4 ft	Joseph Binks	15 yd
1 mile	(Scotland) Hugh Welsh	4:25.0	Charles Bennett	1½ yd	Robert Wellin	10 yd
4 miles	Charles Bennett	20:49.6	Arthur Hutchings	20:58.6	Edward Ratcliffe	21:10.6
10 miles	Charles Bennett	54:18.4	John Rimmer	54:37.4	George Smith	55:31.6
steeplechase	Walter Stokes	11:16.8	W. S. Ingmere	120 yd	Henry Lloyd	80 yd
120yd hurdles	William Paget-Tomlinson	16.4	Alfred Trafford	1½ yd	Joseph Gould	
4 miles walk	William Sturgess	29:20.6	Jack Butler	29:47.0	E. Middleton	31:07.4
high jump	(Leinster) Patrick Leahy	1.784	Claude Leggatt	1.734	Robert Perry	1.683
pole jump	E.C. Pritchard	2.77	G. Pheysey	nh	only 2 competitors	
long jump	(Leinster) William Newburn	6.75	(Scotland) Hugh Barr	6.52	Claude Leggatt	6.04
shot put	(Leinster) Denis Horgan	14.03	(Scotland) R. Nelson Robbie	10.72	only 2 competitors	
hammer throw	(Leinster) Tom Kiely	41.57	(Leinster) Denis Horgan	40.14	(Scotland) R. Nelson Robbie	33.84
