= 1881 AAA Championships =

Outdoor track and field competition

- Dates: 16 & 18 July
- Host city: Birmingham, England
- Venue: Aston Lower Grounds
- Level: Senior
- Type: Outdoor
- Events: 14

The 1881 AAA Championships was an outdoor track and field competition organised by the Amateur Athletic Association (AAA), held on Saturday 16 July and Monday 18 July at Aston Lower Grounds, Birmingham, England. This was the first time the championship had been held outside of London.

== Summary ==
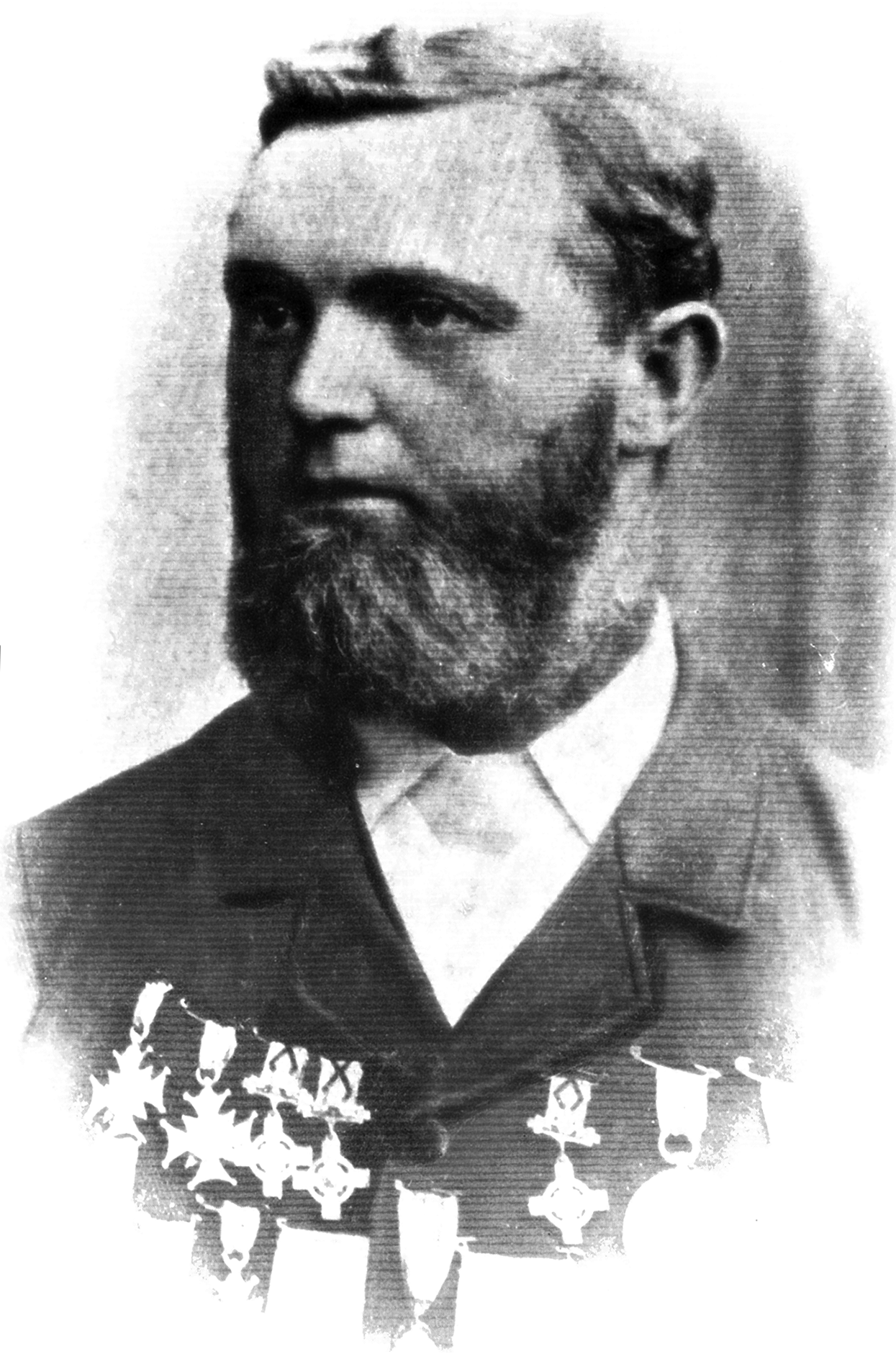
Maurice Davin won two titles

The weather in Birmingham was hot and sunny, "a thin tissue of clouds and a cool breeze somewhat tempered the sun's rays," and a crowd of 14,000 spectators attended the championship. The Aston Company Band played musical selections throughout the afternoon and the prizes were presented by Mrs. Richard Chamberlain, the Lady Mayoress of Birmingham.

The programme of events was the same as last year with fourteen events for men only. The heats and finals all took place on one day with the exception of the 10 miles race which took place on the following Monday, 18 July, at the same venue.

Performances were generally better than last year with championship best performances in eight of the fourteen events, while that in the 100 yards was equal to the best. The track at Aston was a cinder path with a circumference of 501 yards 1 foot. It was measured on the Friday afternoon by a surveyor, Mr. Wilson, using a foot chain laid 12 to 15 inches from the inside edge to confirm the accuracy of the race distances. The ground, did, however, have a slight slope, "the last 300 yards of the 440 yard course sloped more than 6 feet." This favoured competitors in the 440 yards and 120 yards hurdles, so performances in these events cannot be compared with other years. The stadium layout included a separate straight sprint track which also sloped to some extent, and this favoured competitors in both the 100 yards and the long jump. Lon Myers, the American world record holder, said in a letter home, "the descent was about three-quarters of a yard on the sprint path."

Lon Myers competed in both the 100 yards and 440 yards and together with Eugene Merrill (Boston AC) who competed in the 7 miles walk, they were the first foreign athletes to compete in the championship. Myers appeared first, in the first heat of the 100 yards, but the slope on the track threw him off and he did not live up to expectations and finished fourth. The Birmingham Mail said, "before half the distance was covered it was seen that Myers was labouring hard to keep his place." In a letter home Myers described his race thus: "I was thrown out of stride, owing, no doubt, to the downhill course, and the rest of the way I was trying to run and keep from falling at the same time." The 440 yards was a different story, as Myers won easily with time to look round at the other competitors.

Walter George (Moseley Harriers) was the defending champion in both one mile and four miles, but he had been ill since the spring and was not at his best. In the one mile he was challenged by Bernhard Wise, an Australian studying at Oxford University. William Snook (Moseley H.) took the lead for the first 200 yards, then George went to the front to try push the pace and take the sting out of the Australian. Wise stuck to his shoulder until with around three hundred yards to go a small gap opened up and Wise moved ahead and then gradually the gap widened out to around six yards by the finish. 440 yards splits are as follows: 59.0, 2:04.5 (65.5), 3:13.0 (68.5), 4:24.4 (71.4). Disappointed by his performance George did not contest the four miles.

Thomas Ray of Ulverston Cricket Club broke his own world record in the pole jump. He held the world record from September 1879 to July 1891, improving it nine times from 11ft 2 3/4in (3.42m) to 11ft 6 5/8in (3.52m). Maurice Davin (Ireland) equalled the world record in the hammer. Edmund Baddeley had thrown 98ft 10in (30.12m) at the Amateur Athletic Club championship in 1878 and this remained the world record until June 1883. In finishing second in the 440 yards William Phillips became only the second amateur to beat 50 seconds for 440 yards, albeit slightly downhill, a feat achieved by no other amateur until 1886.

There were no heats in the field events, some of which had only two or three competitors. It was customary at the time for race winners only to have their performances recorded, therefore, in the tables below other competitors are shown with the distance each man was behind the man in front. Field event performances are shown in feet and inches as they were originally measured, with a conversion to metric measurement in parentheses. Conversions have been obtained using the International Metric Conversion Tables published by the International Amateur Athletics Federation in 1970.

== Results ==
Event	1st	2nd	3rd
100 yards	William Page Phillips	(Scotland) James John Milroy Cowie	Richard F. Shaw
440 yards	(United States) Lon Myers	William Page Phillips	John H. Plant
880 yards	Sidney Herbert Baker	W. Lock	Samuel King Holman
1 mile	(Australia) Bernhard Wise	Walter George	Henry D. Thomas
4 miles	George Morley Nehan	George Augustus Dunning	J. A. Voelcker
10 miles	George Augustus Dunning	J. A. Voelcker	William Whiteway Alexander
steeplechase	James Ogden	William J. Lawrence	W. Lock
120yd hurdles	George Patrick Charles Lawrence	A. J. Porter	Samuel Palmer
7 miles walk	John W. Raby	(United States) E. E. Merrill	Henry Whyatt
high jump	(Leinster) Patrick Davin	(Scotland) John Whitehill Parsons	n/a
pole jump	Thomas Ray	Edward Aubrey Strachan	n/a
long jump	(Leinster) Patrick Davin	(Leinster) Thomas Michael Malone	Gerard Fowler
shot put	(Leinster) Maurice Davin	William Young Winthrop	n/a
hammer throw	(Leinster) Maurice Davin	Walter Lawrence	William Young Winthrop

== Event summary ==
100 yards
Pos	Athlete	Club	Time /Dist
1.	William Page Phillips	London AC	10 1/5
2.	James John Milroy Cowie	London AC	1/2 yd
3.	Richard F. Shaw	London AC	6 inches
4.	F. F. Cleaver	Notts Forest FC	6 inches

Notes: 2 heats. first two in each heat qualify for the final.

440 yards
Pos	Athlete	Club	Time /Dist
1.	Laurence Eugene Myers	USA	48 3/5
2.	William Page Phillips	London AC	5 yd
3.	John H. Plant	Stourbridge FC	15 yd
4.	W. R. Parry	Moseley H.	5 yd

Notes: no heats. Myers was the first winner of a AAA championship not from Great Britain. The World Record for 440 yards was 49.0 by Myers at Boston, Massachusetts, 26 June 1880. His performance in Birmingham was never ratified as a record due to an advantageous slope on the track.

880 yards
Pos	Athlete	Club	Time /Dist
1.	Sidney Herbert Baker	London AC	2:02 1/5
2.	W. Lock	Spartan H.	1 yd
3.	Samuel King Holman	London AC	2 yd
4.	W. R. Parry	Moseley H.	10 yd
5.	J. Law	Birchfield H.	

Notes: 5 competitors

1 mile
Pos	Athlete	Club	Time /Dist
1.	Bernhard Wise	Australia / Oxford Un. AC	4:24 2/5
2.	Walter George	Moseley H.	4:25 3/5
3.	Henry D. Thomas	London AC	35-50 yd

Notes: only 3 finished

4 miles
Pos	Athlete	Club	Time /Dist
1.	George Morley Nehan	Blackheath H.	20:26 1/5
2.	George Augustus Dunning	Clapton Beagles	20:32
3.	J. A. Voelcker	London AC	400 yd

Notes: “Bell’s Life” gives the winning time as 20:25 1/5 and Dunning’s time as 20:26 4/5. "The Referee" gives Nehan 20:26 4/5 and Dunning 20:32. "The Sportsman" says Nehan 20:21 4/5 with Dunning 80 yards behind. the times here are from Buchanan, president and founder of the International Society of Olympic Historians.

10 miles
Pos	Athlete	Club	Time /Dist
1.	George Augustus Dunning	Clapton Beagles	54:34
2.	J. A. Voelcker	London AC	58:44 3/5
3.	William Whiteway Alexander	Civil Service AA	ret (8 miles)
4.	George Morley Nehan	Blackheath H.	ret (2 miles)
5.	W. Lock	Spartan H.	ret (1 mile)

Notes: Monday 18 July, same venue, only 2 finished

Steeplechase
Pos	Athlete	Club	Time /Dist
1.	James Ogden	Birchfield H.	11:17 3/5
2.	William J. Lawrence	Moseley H.	90-100 yd
3.	W. Lock	Spartan H.	ret

Notes: distance 2 miles, 3 competitors, only 2 finished.

120 yards hurdles
Pos	Athlete	Club	Time /Dist
1.	George Patrick Charles Lawrence	Oxford Un. AC	16 1/5
2.	A. J. Porter	Leicester A.S. FC	8 yd

Notes: 2 heats. first 2 in each heat qualify for the final. Lawrence 16sec. (1 h1). in the final Samuel Palmer (ex-Cambridge Un. AC) fell at the fifth hurdle and did not finish while F. J. W. Wood (London AC) qualified for the final (2 h1) but did not start.

High Jump
Pos	Athlete	Club	Time /Dist
1.	Patrick Davin	Carrick-on-Suir, Ireland	6ft 1/2in (1.84m)
2.	John Whitehill Parsons	Edinburgh Un. AC	5ft 9 1/2in (1.76m)

Notes: only 2 competitors

Pole jump
Pos	Athlete	Club	Time /Dist
1.	Thomas Ray	Ulverston CC	11ft 3in (3.43m)
2.	Edward Aubrey Strachan	Royal Inniskilling Fusiliers	10ft 6in (3.20m)

Notes: only 2 competitors. Ray beat his own World Record set in 1879.

Long Jump
Pos	Athlete	Club	Time /Dist
1.	Patrick Davin	Carrick-on-Suir, Ireland	22ft 11in (6.98m)
2.	Thomas Michael Malone	County Clare, Ireland	22ft 7in (6.88m)
3.	Gerard Fowler	Moseley FC	22ft 1/2in (6.72m)

Notes: John Whitehill Parsons (Edinburgh Un. AC), Francis John W. Wood (London AC), and D. H. Brownfield (Trentham Park CC) also competed but their performance and position are not known.

Shot Put
Pos	Athlete	Club	Time /Dist
1.	Maurice Davin	Ireland	39ft 6 1/2in (12.05m)
2.	William Young Winthrop	London AC	38ft 4 1/2in (11.69m)

Notes: only 2 competitors

Hammer
Pos	Athlete	Club	Time /Dist
1.	Maurice Davin	Carrick-on-Suir, Ireland	98ft 10in (30.12m)
2.	Walter Lawrence	Oxford Un. AC / London AC	97ft 5in (29.70m)
3.	William Young Winthrop	London AC	95ft 4in (29.06m)

Notes: only 3 competitors. "The Field" reports a "7 foot run with a 4 foot handle."

7 miles walk
Pos	Athlete	Club	Time /Dist
1.	John W. Raby	Elland	54:48 2/5
2.	E. E. Merrill	Union AC, Boston, USA	ret (3 miles)
3.	H. Whyatt	Notts Forest FC	ret (2 miles)
	H. Webster	Liverpool	disq

Notes: 4 starters, only 1 competitor finished

Championship best performance
Event	Athlete	Time / Dist	Year
100 yards	William Page Phillips (London AC)	10 1/5	1880
	William Page Phillips (London AC)	10 1/5	1881
440 yards	William Page Phillips (London AC)	51 sec.	1880
880 yards	Samuel King Holman (London AC)	2:00 2/5	1880
1 mile	Bernhard Wise (Australia / Oxford Un. AC)	4:24 2/5	1881
4 miles	George Morley Nehan (Blackheath H.)	20:26 1/5	1881
10 miles	George Augustus Dunning (Clapton Beagles)	54:34	1881
120 yards hurdles	George Patrick Charles Lawrence (Oxford Un. AC)	16 2/5sec.	1880
High jump	Patrick Davin (Ireland)	6ft 1/2in (1.84m)	1881
Pole jump	Thomas Ray (Ulverston CC)	11ft 3in (3.43m)	1881
Long jump	Charles Langton Lockton (London AC)	22ft 2in (6.75m)	1880
Shot put	Maurice Davin (Ireland)	39ft 6 1/2in (12.05m)	1881
Hammer	Maurice Davin (Ireland)	98ft 10in (30.12m)	1881
7 miles walk	John W. Raby (Elland)	54:48 2/5	1881

Notes: Performances in the Steeplechase are not comparable until the event was standardised in the 1930s.
