= Thames Hare and Hounds =

Cross-country running club

- Type: Running club Sports club
- Founded: 1868; 157 years ago
- Location: Wimbledon Common, Roehampton
- League(s): Surrey Cross Country League
- Activities: Cross country running Road running Relays
- Founders: Thames Rowing Club
- Website: www.thameshareandhounds.org.uk

Thames Hare and Hounds is the oldest adult cross-country running club in the world, based on the Roehampton end of Wimbledon Common, adjacent to Richmond Park, and draws runners from across south-west London. Both the men's and women's teams compete in the Surrey Cross Country League, division one; the club also fields teams in road races and relays. Thames host races in Richmond Park and on Wimbledon Common, in particular the cross-country Oxford–Cambridge Varsity Match, held each year since 1880 on Wimbledon Common after the end of Michaelmas term.

== History ==
The club was founded in 1868, by members of Thames Rowing Club, particularly Walter Rye. Its name derives from the Victorian game of "Hare and Hounds" or "Paper Chase", in which one runner (the "hare") lays a trail of paper to be followed by the other runners (the "hounds"). The game had been established in schools for decades before the founding of Thames - the Royal Shrewsbury School Hunt has written records going back to 1831.
