= William Snook =

British athlete

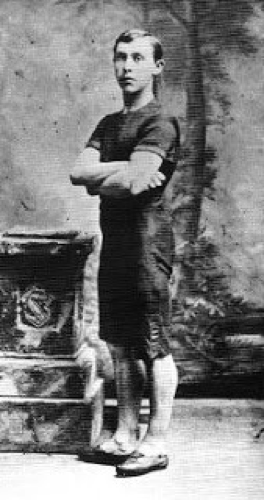
- Born: 3 February 1861; Shrewsbury
- Died: 9 December 1916; Erdington
- Resting place: Witton Cemetery
- Occupations: Runner, publican, coach

William Snook (3 February 1861–9 December 1916) was an English running champion, whose life was mired in controversy and ended in poverty.

== Early life ==
Snook was born on 3 February 1861 at Belle Vue, then in the parish of St Julian's, Shrewsbury, to Mary (formerly Corfield) and George Snook. His father was a quarry owner and highway surveyor. Snook attended Admaston College in Shropshire.

The 1881 census has him at West View House, Copthorne, Shrewsbury, with his parents, maternal grandmother and three younger sisters. His occupation is given as "clerk".

An obituary in the Shrewsbury Chronicle of 23 April 1917 notes that he was 5 feet 5 3/4 inches (1.67 m) tall, with a 42-inch (110 cm) chest.

== Career ==
Snook's earliest recorded athletic success was a third place in a quarter-mile race for under-18s at an 1877 Wenlock Olympians meeting, when he ran for Pengwern Boat Club. In 1879, he won a half-mile handicap race at the same venue, but it was becoming clear that his aptitude was for the stamina of long-distance races, not the speed of sprinting. In the same year he won six of the eight one-mile races he entered. He was invited to join Moseley Harriers, in Birmingham, where his team mate, and rival in individual events, was Walter George. By early 1885 he had joined Birchfield Harriers, also in Birmingham.

At the 1880 AAA Championships, Snook finished second behind Charles Mason in the 10 miles event.

In July 1881 he visited Paris, where he won a private 7 1/2-mile (12.1 km) race against M. Duplay, an army officer and racehorse owner, in the Bois de Boulogne. From August 1882 until the end of that year, he was suspended from AAA events, as the result of an allegation—which he denied—that he had been complicit in a professional runner competing as an amateur, under an assumed name.

However, he the won three AAA Championships titles at the 1883 AAA Championships, winning the 1 mile, 4 miles and 10 miles events. The following year at the 1884 AAA Championships, he won the steeplechase title and then won another four titles at the 1885 AAA Championships in the 1 mile, 4 miles, 10 miles and steeplechase.

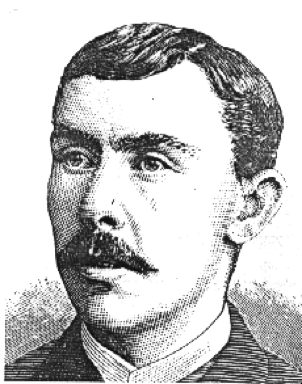
William Snook

On 6 March 1886, he came second in a cross-country race at Croydon. There was much betting on the outcome, and the Southern branch of the AAA accused him of "roping" - taking a bribe to throw the race - and the AAA banned him from their events, for life. He protested his innocence, but—despite there being only circumstantial evidence—his appeal was rejected by a 15:11 vote. A second appeal, in February 1887, supported by the Midlands branch of the AAA, and a petition signed by over 300 athletic club representatives, was denied by 13:12, but referred to the organisation's Annual General Meeting, where his final attempt to clear his name was rebuffed by a 26:16 vote.

He turned professional and ran competitively for another three years, also managing public houses. From 1885 to 1887 he managed The Criterion in High Street, Shrewsbury, and from 1888 to 1890 The Old Stone Cross in Dale End, (Note: Andrews wrongly lists this as "Dale Street".) Birmingham. In April 1890 he was also associated with The Vine in Alma Street, Birmingham.

He subsequently moved to France to work as a running and cycling coach. In October 1904, he met members of the Birchfield Harriers, when they visited Paris.

== Allegation of theft ==
While living in Levallois-Perret a town just outside Paris, in September 1895, Snook was tried for the distraction-theft of bonds from a customer in a branch of the bank Crédit Foncier, Monsieur Eugene Joly de Morny. Morny had been robbed by three Englishmen. One of them, Snook's co-defendant and landlord, Matthew Parry (alias Clifford), was convicted and sentenced to five years in prison, after an envelope bearing his address was left at the scene, but Snook was acquitted for lack of evidence.

== Personal life, death ==
Snook married Elizabeth Jane, née Coleman, on 9 August 1884 at St. John's, Toxteth, Liverpool. Their two children, a son and a daughter, each lived only a few months. They separated, and she sued for divorce in 1892 (the case being heard before Francis Jeune) on the grounds of his cruelty, and his adultery with her cousin, who bore him a daughter in January 1892. She became aware of Snook's infidelity when he was called as a witness in a May 1891 trial brought because the cousin had had a (then-illegal) abortion, and admitted the affair. She also said that he had often beaten her, that he had dragged her down stairs by her hair, and that he had fired a revolver in her bedroom, in an attempt to frighten her. Snook did not contest the allegations, nor defend the case, and the divorce was granted, becoming absolute on 31 January 1893. Elizabeth died on 10 February 1900, and was buried at Shrewsbury's General Cemetery.

During 1916, Snook's health deteriorated, and he was hospitalised in Paris. This was not ideal, as the First World War was in sweet progress, with fighting just 30 miles (48 km) away. An appeal for funds was held in England, from April that year, by the Birmingham-based newspaper Sport & Play and Wheel, attracting many donations from his former teammates, and competitors, and other athletes. The funds enabled Snook's return to Birmingham in October. Being desperately short of money, he initially lodged in Rowton House, a low-rent hostel. After he died in Birmingham Workhouse, Erdington's infirmary (Note: The former Aston Union Workhouse; Aston became part of Birmingham in 1911.) on 9 December 1916, his funeral was paid for by his former club, Birchfield Harriers. He was buried in a communal grave at Witton Cemetery on 17 December.

He was survived by three sisters. A younger brother pre-deceased him.
