= 1880 AAA Championships =

Outdoor track and field competition

- Dates: 3 July
- Host city: London, England
- Venue: Lillie Bridge Grounds
- Level: Senior
- Type: Outdoor

The 1880 AAA Championships was an outdoor track and field competition organised by the Amateur Athletic Association (AAA), held on Saturday 3 July at Lillie Bridge Grounds, London, England. It was the first championships organised by the AAA, and it replaced championships held by the Amateur Athletic Club since 1866. Representatives of the Amateur Athletic Club handed over to the new association the challenge cups that had been competed for at their championship for presentation at the new competition. The prizes were presented by Lady Jersey, wife of the Earl of Jersey.

The fourteen events on the programme were for men only, with heats and finals all held on the same day, with the exception of the 10 miles race, which was held on the following Thursday, 7 July, at the same venue. The track was one-third of a mile (586 yards 2 feet) in circumference with one long straight and three bends. There were no heats in the field events, some of which had only two or three competitors. It was customary at the time for race winners only to have their performances recorded, therefore, in the tables below other competitors are shown with the distance each man was behind the man in front. Field event performances are shown in feet and inches as they were originally measured, with a conversion to metric measurement in parentheses. Conversions have been obtained using the International Metric Conversion Tables published by the International Amateur Athletics Federation in 1970.

It had rained heavily during the morning and by three o'clock, when the first event was due to start, the track was waterlogged and the grass, where the hurdles were set up, was slippery. For the one mile there were only two entries, but Samuel Holman (London AC) did not start and Walter George (Moseley Harriers) ran alone in the outside lane to avoid the water. The times for his three laps were as follows: 1:21.4, 2:54.0 (1:32.6), 4:28.0 (1:34.0).

There were two heats in the 440 yards, with the first two in each heat qualifying for the final. In heat two there was a dead heat for second place and all three were advanced to the final. The winner of the final was Montague Shearman, the honorary secretary of the organising committee.

William Hough (Cambridge Un. AC) had won the 3 miles at the Cambridge Sports and set a new meet record of 15:01 1/5 in the match against Oxford University and was thought to be the favourite to win the 4 miles. There were eight starters, only five of whom finished the race. James Concannon (Widnes AC), the winner of the steeplechase, led for the first lap, but was soon overtaken and dropped out after one mile. The lead was taken over by P. H. Stenning (London AC) who took them through the first mile (3 laps) in 4:56 with Hough in second place and Walter George (Moseley H.), who had started quite slowly, moved up into fourth place. Hough and Stenning then alternated the lead as George moved up into third place. Stenning led at two miles (10:22) but shortly after George took the lead and Stenning dropped out leaving Hough in second place. A. H. Davis (Blackheath H.) was eighty yards away in third and close behind him was A. S. Suffell (Clapton Beagles). At three miles, passed in 15:39, George was slightly ahead of Hough, who then dashed into the lead and tried to open up a gap, but George caught him within a lap and Hough stopped by the pavilion and retired leaving George a long way ahead of Davis and Suffell. They finished in that order with W. Johnson almost a whole lap behind.

William Winthrop's performance in the shot put was a world amateur record. He held the record for one year until it was beaten in this championship in 1881, and he remains the only Englishman ever to hold the world record in this event.

== Results ==
Event	1st	2nd	3rd
100 yards	(England) William Page Phillips	(Tasmania) Charles Langton Lockton	(England) Herbert M. Massey
440 yards	Montague Shearman	William Page Phillips	Thomas A. Lynch
880 yards	Samuel King Holman	John Draper Sadler	(Scotland) A. S. Paterson
1 mile	Walter George	n/a	n/a
4 miles	Walter George	A. H. Davies	William Suffell
10 miles	Charles Henry Mason	William Snook	Percy Haines Stenning
steeplechase	James Concannon	Charles O'Malley	Robert Seymour Benson
120yd hurdles	George Patrick Charles Lawrence	Samuel Palmer	Francis Cleaver
7 miles walk	George Phillip Beckley	T. A. Murphy	James Alfred Squires
high jump	(Scotland) John Whitehill Parsons	Francis Henry Augustus Bell	Robert Thomas
pole jump	Edward Aubrey Strachan	Frederic William Darby Robinson	George Callow
long jump	Charles Langton Lockton	(Scotland) John Whitehill Parsons	Herbert M. Massey
shot put	William Young Winthrop	n/a	n/a
hammer throw	Walter Lawrence	William Young Winthrop	n/a

== Event summary ==
100 yards
Pos	Athlete	Club	Time /Dist
1.	William Page Phillips	London Athletic Club	10 1/5 sec.
2.	Charles Langton Lockton	London AC	1/2 yard
3.	Herbert M. Massey	London AC/United Hospitals AC	inches
4.	J. B. Williamson	Glasgow Academicals	
5.	James John Milroy Cowie	London AC	

Notes: no heats, 5 competitors only

440 yards
Pos	Athlete	Club	Time /Dist
1.	Montague Shearman	Oxford University AC	52 1/5sec.
2.	William Page Phillips	London AC	4 yd
3.	Thomas A. Lynch	Ireland	2 1/2 yd
4.	Henry Rawlins Ball	London AC	
5.	Sidney Herbert Baker	London AC	

Notes: 2 heats, Lynch 51 3/5sec.; Phillips 51 sec.

880 yards
Pos	Athlete	Club	Time /Dist
1.	Samuel King Holman	London AC	2:00 2/5
2.	John Draper Sadler	London AC	6 1/2 yards
3.	A. Paterson	Edinburgh University AC	
4.	R. W. Whalley	Widnes AC	

1 mile
Pos	Athlete	Club	Time /Dist
1.	Walter George	Moseley Harriers	4:28 3/5

Notes: only one competitor

4 miles
Pos	Athlete	Club	Time /Dist
1.	Walter George	Moseley H.	20:45 4/5
2.	A. H. Davies	Blackheath Harriers	21:15
3.	W. S. Suffell	Clapton Beagles	21:56
4.	S. G. Johnson	Lees Football Club	22:20
5.	W. H. C. Andrews	ex-Strollers HC	

Notes: only 5 finished

10 miles
Pos	Athlete	Club	Time /Dist
1.	Charles Henry Mason	Thames Hare and Hounds	56:07
2.	William Snook	Pengwern Rowing C., Shrewsbury	56:18 1/2
3.	Percy Haines Stenning	London AC/Thames Hare & Hounds	56:24 1/2
4.	W. S. Suffell	Clapton Beagles	57:13 1/5

Steeplechase
Pos	Athlete	Club	Time /Dist
1.	James Concannon	Widnes FC	10:26
2.	C. L. O'Malley	Ireland	45 yd
3.	Robert Seymour Benson	Royal School of Mines	20 yd

Notes: Distance was 1 mile 1,440 yards (2,912 metres)

120 yards hurdles
Pos	Athlete	Club	Time /Dist
1.	George Patrick Charles Lawrence	Oxford Un. AC	16 2/5sec.
2.	Samuel Palmer	Cambridge University AC	3/4-1 yard
3.	F. F. Cleaver	Notts Forest FC	4-5 yards

Notes: 2 heats

High Jump
Pos	Athlete	Club	Time /Dist
1.	John Whitehill Parsons	Edinburgh Un. AC	5ft 9 3/4in (1.77m)
2.	Francis Henry Augustus Bell	Dulwich College	5ft 7in (1.70m)
3.	R. E. Thomas	Liverpool Gymnasium	5ft 6in (1.67m)

Notes: only 3 competitors

Pole jump
Pos	Athlete	Club	Time /Dist
1.	Edward Aubrey Strachan	108th Regiment	10ft 4in (3.15m)
2.	Frederic William Darby Robinson	Beccles Athletic Club	10ft 1in (3.07m)
3.	George Callow	Peterborough Cricket Club	9ft 3in (2.82m)

Notes: only 3 competitors

Long Jump
Pos	Athlete	Club	Time /Dist
1.	Charles Langton Lockton	London AC	22ft 2in (6.75m)
2.	John Whitehill Parsons	Edinburgh Un. AC	21ft 1 1/2in (6.44m)
3.	Herbert M. Massey	London AC/United Hospitals AC	21ft 0in (6.40m)
4.	F. W. Fellowes	Burton FC	
5.	George Patrick Charles Lawrence	Oxford Un. AC	

Notes: only 5 competitors

Shot Put
Pos	Athlete	Club	Time /Dist
1.	William Young Winthrop	Cambridge Un. AC/London AC	37ft 3in (11.35m)

Notes: only 1 competitor

Hammer
Pos	Athlete	Club	Time /Dist
1.	Walter Lawrence	Oxford Un. AC/London AC	96ft 0in (29.26m)
2.	William Young Winthrop	London AC	74ft 2in (22.60m)

Notes: only 2 competitors

7 miles walk
Pos	Athlete	Club	Time /Dist
1.	George Phillip Beckley	London AC	56:40
2.	T. A. Murphy	Highgate Harriers	56:57
3.	James Alfred Squires	London AC	58:29

Notes: only 4 finishers. Harry Webster (Stoke AC) finished first in 53:50 but was disqualified.
