= Walter George (athlete) =

British Middle-distance runner (1859–1943)

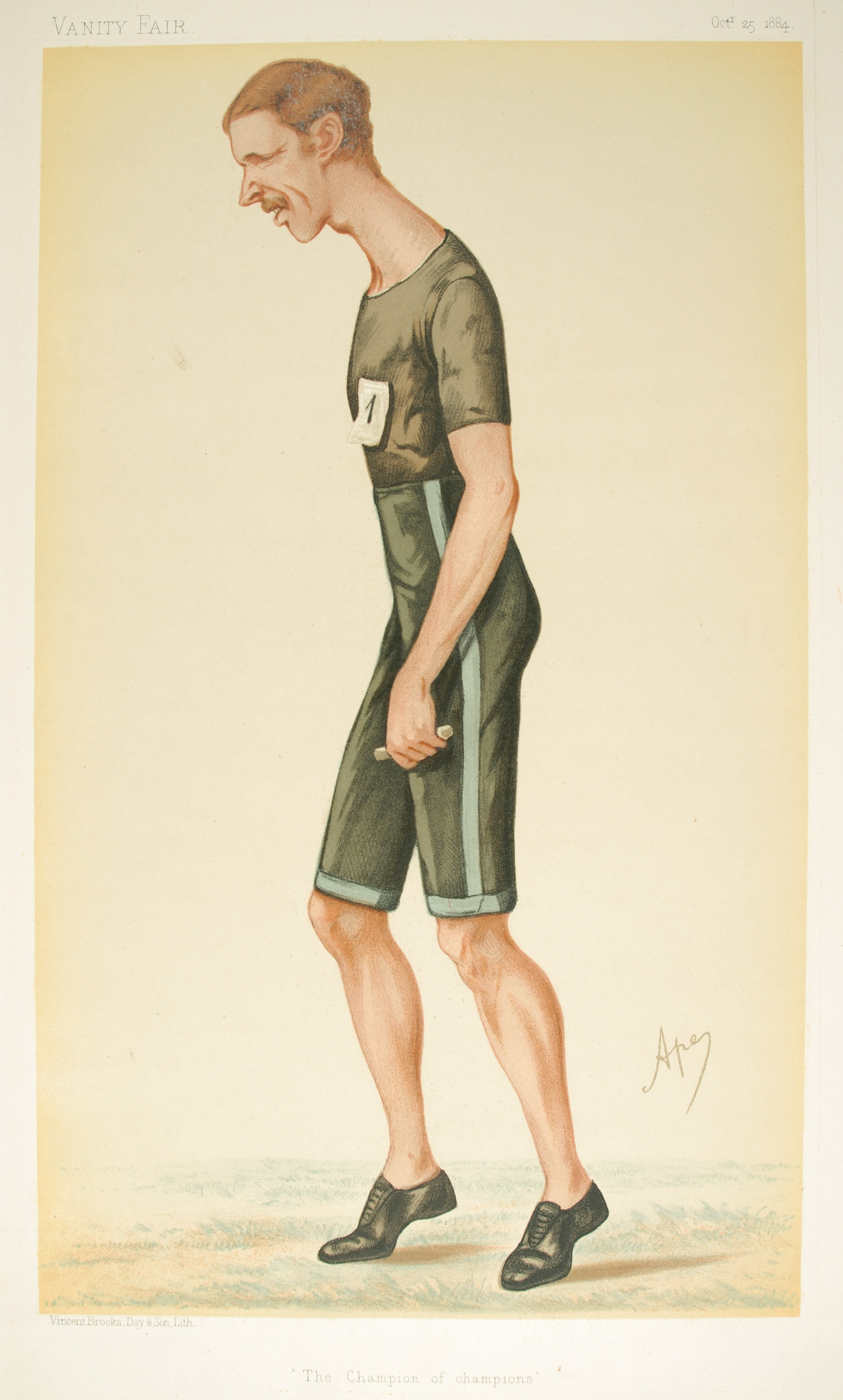
- "The Champion of Champions": caricature by Ape, published in Vanity Fair in 1884

Personal information
- Born: 9 September 1858
- Died: 4 June 1943 (aged 84)

Sport
- Sport: Athletics
- Event: Middle-distance running
- Club: Moseley Harriers

Walter Goodall George (9 September 1858 – 4 June 1943) was a British runner who, after setting numerous world records as an amateur, went professional in part to challenge the mile record-holder William Cummings, defeating him in several highly publicized races. In one of those races on 23 August 1886, he set a mile record which was not surpassed for almost 30 years.

== Personal life ==
George was born and brought up in Calne, Wiltshire. At age 15 he was apprenticed as a pharmacist and worked long hours in a dispensary.

== Amateur career ==
At 16, George entered cycling and then walking races on weekends for exercise. Before turning 20 in 1878, he trained for three months and boasted, to his friends' amusement, that he would one day run a mile in 4:12. This was at a time when the amateur mile record was 4:24 1/2 and the professional mile record was 4:17 1/4. He wrote in a notebook the quarter-mile splits required to achieve such a time: 59s; 2:02; 3:08.

In his first race, he was given a 45-yard handicap and promptly won in 4:29, which caused the officials to withhold the prize money until they could determine whether he was a ringer. He never again was given a handicap.

His unorthodox training technique, necessitated by his apprenticeship, was to do what he called "100-up" which involved running in place with high knee lifts and springing, and to take baths in brine. He found quick success, winning two titles at the AAC Championships; becoming the national mile champion and the national four-mile champion at the 1879 AAC Championships.

The next year, the first Amateur Athletic Association (AAA) championship was held and George won the mile (in 4:28 3/5) and the four miles at the 1880 AAA Championships. Then, on 16 August at Stamford Bridge, London, George held his "ideal" pace for one lap – 59s – then slowed to 2:04 1/2 and 3:14. Though he was disappointed to finish in 4:23 1/5, the time established a new amateur world record.

On the professional side of racing, William Cummings was also running impressive mile times, setting a professional record of 4:16 1/5 in 1881 while George spent most of that year injured.

On 3 June 1882, George ran another amateur world mile record of 4:19 2/5, leaving only Cummings and two other professionals with faster performances. George applied to the AAA to race the professional Cummings, but was denied permission.

Travelling to America, George faced the top American miler Lon Myers over a series of three races in November 1882. A total of 130,000 attended these races at the Polo Grounds in New York City. In the first, Myers beat George 1:56 3/5 to 1:57 in the 880 yards. The next week, George led all the way in defeating his rival 4:21 2/5 to 4:27 3/5 in the mile. In the final 3/4 mile showdown, 60,000 watched George and Myers battle on a cold day on a bad track. George led narrowly with a 61 2/5 and 2:02 3/4 before Myers took the lead. But Myers staggered at the end and collapsed after crossing in 3:13 – behind George who won in 3:10 1/2. Both fell unconscious after the race and George described it as "the most gruelling race I ever ran".

In 1883, George was ill and William Snook won the mile championship, though George recovered to improve upon his amateur record for 10 miles. The next year, George sought revenge on Snook, as they met on 21 June at the Aston Lower Grounds in Birmingham for the AAA championships. George prevailed in the race at 4:18 2/5, setting his third amateur mile record in the process.

That same year he won titles over the 4-miles, 10-miles, the 880 yards and in cross country. He additionally set world amateur records in the 2 miles (9:17 2/5), 3 miles (14:39), 6 miles (30:21 1/2), 10 miles (51:20) and one hour (11 miles 932 yards).

== Professional career ==
With nothing more to prove in the amateur world, George turned professional in 1885 and challenged Cummings over the mile.

The long-awaited mile challenge race was held on 31 August 1885 at Lillie Bridge, London, witnessed by some 30,000 spectators. Crowds of people angry they had been denied entry broke through the closed entry gates and ended up completely encircling the running track both inside and out.

Cummings arrived at 5:30 pm and walked two laps of the track. George, caught in traffic, arrived shortly before 6:00 pm and climbed over the crowd with a ladder as the risk of injury pushing through the crowd was too great. Nevertheless, both runners had to force their way through the crowds with their handlers.

Betting was heavy, with Cummings favoured over George. At the gun, George dashed ahead, with Cummings close behind, in a steady rain. Cummings, who had won the coin toss, had chosen the third-of-a-mile rectangular cinder track at the site over the favoured quarter-mile cycling track. At the quarter mile point of the race, hindered by the slow track with sharp corners, George led with 58 3/5, a torrid pace which the crowd enthusiastically cheered.

But Cummings was close enough to be able to touch George's heels with his fingertips. At the half-mile point, they were at 2:01, and the crowd went delirious. At 1,000 yards, Cummings pulled even. At the three-quarter mark, George was at 3:07 1/2, only half a second slower than the world record pace.

Instead of slowing, George kept the pace, and Cummings struggled to keep up. Halfway through the final lap, Cummings gave up and started to walk, and since winning was the main concern today, George slowed to a walk when he was far enough ahead. Cummings, urged by his boosters, started to run again, which caused George to start to run again. He beat Cummings by some 65 yards in a time of 4:20 1/5, remarkably fast given his leisurely last lap.

Cummings got revenge later in 1885 by badly defeating George in a four-mile challenge race at Powderhall Grounds in Edinburgh, and in a 10-mile challenge soon after that back at Lillie Bridge.

== 1886 challenge mile ==
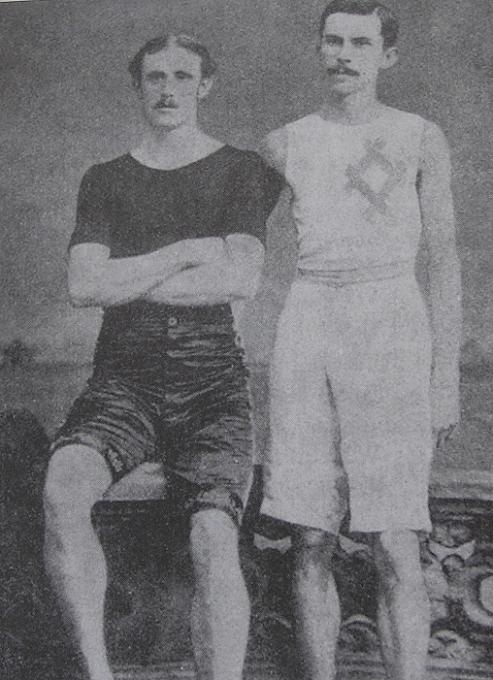
George (left), and Lon Myers

Their most famous encounter occurred in 1886, a rematch of their 1885-mile challenge. On 23 August, again at Lillie Bridge, the two runners raced each other in front of 20,000 spectators.

The starting gun was fired by former two-mile record-holder Jack White, and George, as he did the year before, led off. The first lap was in 58 1/4. Cummings followed closely, looking relaxed. At the half, George was at 2:01 3/4. As they completed the third lap, neither runner looked weak. As they passed three-quarters in 3:07 3/4, Cummings pulled up alongside George and the crowd went wild.

Cummings launched a kick with 350 yards to go and opened an eight-yard lead. George held back, sure that Cummings could not hold the pace. Sure enough, George closed the gap, came even and then pulled ahead by two yards. Then, Cummings pulled up lame, and George coasted to the finish.

The spectators, in contrast to the congratulatory mob which surrounded George the previous year upon his victory, waited silently for the time to be written on the blackboard. When the time was written down – 4:12 3/4 – pandemonium broke out. Cummings' record was gone, and George's mark would not be surpassed for almost 30 years.

Cummings got some revenge on George by defeating him in a four-mile challenge race, but in a 10-mile challenge George lapped Cummings, who was forced to drop out. In 1888, Cummings defeated George in a 3/4 mile race and two one-mile races, though neither time was faster than 4:30.

George met Myers again in Australia in 1887, beating him in all but the 880 yards.

Though George's 4:12 3/4 was impressive, he ran some time trials in 1885 which were truly remarkable. In the first, two weeks before his professional debut against Cummings, he ran a 4:14 1/2. Then, in Surbiton several days before the big race, he ran against some local runners with handicaps. His splits were 58 1/5, 1:58 3/5 and 3:07, and finished in a startling 4:10 1/5. Not believing their watches, the track was immediately measured: he had run six yards too far. No man would run the mile faster until 1931.

== Legacy ==
In 1986, to mark the anniversary of George's world record, a plaque was erected on Calne Town Hall. The plaque was unveiled by Sydney Wooderson, who in 1937 had been the first Briton to better George's time.

In 2010, George was inducted into the England Athletics Hall of Fame.
