= Athletics at the 1975 Summer Universiade – Women's high jump =

The women's high jump event at the 1975 Summer Universiade was held at the Stadio Olimpico in Rome on 20 September.

== Results ==
Rank	Athlete	Nationality	1.70	1.74	1.78	1.82	1.84	1.86	1.88	Result	Notes
1st place, gold medalist(s)	Galina Filatova	Soviet Union							o	1.88	
2nd place, silver medalist(s)	Sara Simeoni	Italy					o	o	xxo	1.88	
3rd place, bronze medalist(s)	Alla Fedorchuk	Soviet Union								1.86	
4	Andrea Mátay	Hungary								1.86	
5	Joni Hutley	United States								1.86	
6	Karin Geese	West Germany								1.82	
7	Debbie Brill	Canada								1.79	
8	Louise Walker	Canada								1.79	
9	Valerie Harrison	Great Britain								1.76	
10	Snežana Hrepevnik	Yugoslavia								1.76	
11	Denise Brown	Great Britain								1.73	
12	Virginia Ioan	Romania								1.73	
13	Modupe Oshikoya	Nigeria								1.73	
14	Geneviève Dycke	France								1.70	
15	Mariam Sedarati	Iran								1.55	
16	Ulrike Häberlein	Chile								1.55	
