= 1974 European Athletics Championships – Women's high jump =

Women's high jump at the European Athletics Championships

The women's high jump at the 1974 European Athletics Championships was held in Rome, Italy, at Stadio Olimpico on 6 and 8 September 1974.

== Medalists ==
Gold	Rosemarie Witschas; East Germany
Silver	Milada Karbanová; Czechoslovakia
Bronze	Sara Simeoni; Italy

== Results ==
=== Final ===
8 September

Rank	Name	Nationality	Result	Notes
1st place, gold medalist(s)	Rosemarie Witschas	East Germany	1.95	WR
2nd place, silver medalist(s)	Milada Karbanová	Czechoslovakia	1.91	NR
3rd place, bronze medalist(s)	Sara Simeoni	Italy	1.89	NR
4	Rita Kirst	East Germany	1.89	
5	Miroslava Hübnerová	Czechoslovakia	1.86	
6	Galina Filatova	Soviet Union	1.86	
7	Ulrike Meyfarth	West Germany	1.83	
8	Mária Mračnová	Czechoslovakia	1.83	
9	Marie-Christine Debourse	France	1.83	
10	Annemieke Bouma	Netherlands	1.83	
11	Karin Wagner	West Germany	1.83	
12	Virginia Ioan	Romania	1.80	
13	Tamara Galka	Soviet Union	1.75	
14	Ruth Watt	Great Britain	1.70	
14	Barbara Lawton	Great Britain	1.70	

=== Qualification ===
6 September

Rank	Name	Nationality	Result	Notes
	Rosemarie Witschas	East Germany	1.80	Q
	Karin Wagner	West Germany	1.80	Q
	Sara Simeoni	Italy	1.80	Q
	Marie-Christine Debourse	France	1.80	Q
	Rita Kirst	East Germany	1.80	Q
	Milada Karbanová	Czechoslovakia	1.80	Q
	Virginia Ioan	Romania	1.80	Q
	Tamara Galka	Soviet Union	1.80	Q
	Mária Mračnová	Czechoslovakia	1.80	Q
	Ruth Watt	Great Britain	1.80	Q
	Galina Filatova	Soviet Union	1.80	Q
	Annemieke Bouma	Netherlands	1.80	Q
	Barbara Lawton	Great Britain	1.80	Q
	Miroslava Hübnerová	Czechoslovakia	1.80	Q
	Ulrike Meyfarth	West Germany	1.80	Q
	Astrid Tveit	Norway	1.78	
	Val Harrison	Great Britain	1.78	
	Grith Ejstrup	Denmark	1.75	
	Stanka Valkanova	Bulgaria	1.75	
	Ann-Ewa Karlsson	Sweden	1.70	
	Herica Teodorescu	Romania	DNS	

== Participation ==
According to an unofficial count, 20 athletes from 13 countries participated in the event.

- Bulgaria (1)
- Czechoslovakia (3)
- Denmark (1)
- East Germany (2)
- France (1)
- Italy (1)
- Netherlands (1)
- Norway (1)
- Romania (1)
- Soviet Union (2)
- Sweden (1)
- Great Britain (3)
- West Germany (2)
