= Athletics at the 1973 Summer Universiade – Women's high jump =

The women's high jump event at the 1973 Summer Universiade was held at the Central Lenin Stadium in Moscow on 17 and 19 August.

== Medalists ==
Gold	Silver	Bronze
Virginia Ioan; Romania	Jutta Kirst; East Germany	Galina Filatova; Soviet Union; Sara Simeoni; Italy

== Results ==
=== Qualification ===
Rank	Group	Athlete	Nationality	Result	Notes
?	?	Marie-Christine Wartel	France	1.70	
?	?	Elke Kalliwoda	East Germany	1.70	
?	?	Sara Simeoni	Italy	1.70	
?	?	Herica Teodorescu	Romania	1.70	
?	?	Galina Filatova	Soviet Union	1.70	
?	?	Virginia Ioan	Romania	1.70	
?	?	Jutta Kirst	East Germany	1.70	
?	?	Louise Hanna	Canada	1.70	
?	?	Renate Gärtner	West Germany	1.70	
?	?	Karen Moller	United States	1.70	
?	?	Renate Pietschmann	West Germany	1.70	
?	?	Nataliya Kazeyeva	Soviet Union	1.70	
?	?	Heleena Kullas	Finland	1.70	
14	?	Alice Pfaff	United States	1.60	
15	?	Jurema da Silva	Brazil	1.55	

=== Final ===
Rank	Athlete	Nationality	Result	Notes
1st place, gold medalist(s)	Virginia Ioan	Romania	1.84	
2nd place, silver medalist(s)	Jutta Kirst	East Germany	1.84	
3rd place, bronze medalist(s)	Galina Filatova	Soviet Union	1.81	
3rd place, bronze medalist(s)	Sara Simeoni	Italy	1.81	
5	Elke Kalliwoda	East Germany	1.78	
5	Renate Pietschmann	West Germany	1.78	
5	Herica Teodorescu	Romania	1.78	
8	Marie-Christine Wartel	France	1.75	
8	Nataliya Kazeyeva	Soviet Union	1.75	
8	Renate Gärtner	West Germany	1.75	
8	Louise Hanna	Canada	1.75	
12	Heleena Kullas	Finland	1.70	
13	Karen Moller	United States	1.65	
