= List of British champions in high jump =

The British high jump athletics champions covers four competitions; the current British Athletics Championships which was founded in 2007, the preceding AAA Championships (1880-2006), the Amateur Athletic Club Championships (1866-1879) and finally the UK Athletics Championships which existed from 1977 until 1997 and ran concurrently with the AAA Championships.

Where an international athlete won the AAA Championships the highest ranking UK athlete is considered the National Champion in this list.

== Past winners ==
AAC Championships men's event only
Year	Men's champion
1866	John Roupell & J. C. Little
1867	Charles Green & Thomas Little
1868	Robert J. C. Mitchell
1869	John Hoare
1870	Robert J. C. Mitchell
1871	Robert J. C. Mitchell
1872	Edward Prior
1873	John Hurst
1874	Marshall Brooks
1875	Michael Glazebrook
1876	Marshall Brooks
1877	Gerard Blathwayt
1878	Thomas Tomlinson
1879	Reginald Macaulay, Robert Thomas & William Hall

AAA Championships high jump, men's event only
Year	Men's champion
1880	John Parsons
1881	Patrick Davin
1882	R. F. Houghton
1883	John Parsons
1884	Tom Ray
1885	Patrick Kelly
1886	George Rowdon
1887	George Rowdon
1888	George Rowdon
1889	Thomas Jennings
1890	Cecil Haward
1891	Thomas Jennings
1892	Arthur Watkinson
1893	James Ryan
1894	Reginald Williams
1895	James Ryan
1896	Murty O'Brien
1897	Claude Leggatt
1898	Patrick Leahy
1899	Patrick Leahy
1900	Walter Henderson & Peter O'Connor
1901	Peter O'Connor
1902	Peter O'Connor
1903	Peter O'Connor
1904	Peter O'Connor
1905	Con Leahy
1906	Con Leahy
1907	Con Leahy
1908	Con Leahy
1909	John Banks
1910	Benjamin Howard Baker
1911	Benjamin Howard Baker
1912	Benjamin Howard Baker
1913	Benjamin Howard Baker
1914	Benjamin Howard Baker
1919	Benjamin Howard Baker
1920	Benjamin Howard Baker
1921	Benjamin Howard Baker

AAA Championships & WAAA Championships
Year	Men's champion	Year	Women's champion
1922	R.A. Nicholas	1922	Sylvia Stone
1923	Jack Probert	1923	Hilda Hatt
1924	Arthur Willis	1924	Sophie Eliott-Lynn
1925	Fred Nuttall	1925	Phyllis Green
1926	Carl Van Geysel	1926	Phyllis Green
1927	Jack London	1927	Phyllis Green
1928	Harry Simmonds	1928	Marjorie O'Kell
1929	Alec James	1929	Marjorie O'Kell
1930	Edward Bradbrooke & Geoffrey Turner	1930	Mary Milne
1931	Arthur Gray	1931	Marjorie O'Kell
1932	William Land	1932	Mary Milne
1933	Edward Bradbrooke	1933	Mary Milne
1934	John Michie	1934	Mary Milne
1935	Stanley West	1935	Mary Milne
1936	Stanley West & Arthur Gold	1936	Dorothy Odam
1937	John Newman	1937	Dorothy Odam
1938	Robert Kennedy	1938	Dorothy Odam
1939	John Newman	1939	Dorothy Odam
1945	nc	1945	Dora Gardner
1946	Alan Paterson	1946	Dora Gardner
1947	Ron Pavitt	1947	Gladys Young
1948	Alan Paterson	1948	Dorothy Tyler
1949	Alan Paterson	1949	Dorothy Tyler
1950	Alan Paterson	1950	Sheila Alexander
1951	Ron Pavitt	1951	Sheila Lerwill
1952	Ron Pavitt	1952	Dorothy Tyler
1953	Derek Cox	1953	Sheila Lerwill
1954	Tony Orton	1954	Sheila Lerwill
1955	William Piper	1955	Thelma Hopkins
1956	Michael Ludlow & Paul Stableforth	1956	Dorothy Tyler
1957	David Wilson	1957	Thelma Hopkins
1958	Gordon Miller	1958	Mary Bignal
1959	Crawford Fairbrother	1959	Mary Bignal
1960	Gordon Miller	1960	Dorothy Shirley
1961	Crawford Fairbrother	1961	Dorothy Shirley
1962	Crawford Fairbrother	1962	Frances Slaap
1963	Crawford Fairbrother	1963	Linda Knowles & Susan Dennler
1964	Crawford Fairbrother	1964	Frances Slaap
1965	Crawford Fairbrother	1965	Frances Slaap
1966	Gordon Miller	1966	Dorothy Shirley
1967	Gordon Miller	1967	Linda Knowles
1968	Michael Campbell	1968	Dorothy Shirley
1969	Crawford Fairbrother	1969	Barbara Inkpen
1970	NBA	1970	Dorothy Shirley
1971	Michael Campbell	1971	Barbara Inkpen
1972	Colin Boreham	1972	Rosaline Few
1973	Michael Campbell	1973	Barbara Lawton
1974	Richard Gyles	1974	Val Harrison
1975	Angus McKenzie	1975	Denise Brown
1976	Milton Palmer	1976	Denise Brown

AAA Championships/WAAA Championships & UK Athletics Championships dual championships era 1977-1987
Year	AAA Men	Year	WAAA Women	Year	UK Men	UK Women
1977	Alan Dainton	1977	Brenda Gibbs	1977	Mike Butterfield	Brenda Gibbs
1978	Brian Burgess	1978	Carol Mathers	1978	Mark Naylor	Gillian Hitchen
1979	Ossie Cham & Tim Foulger	1979	Barbara Simmonds	1979	Brian Burgess	Ann-Marie Devally
1980	Mark Naylor	1980	Ann-Marie Devally	1980	Mark Naylor	Louise Miller
1981	Mark Naylor	1981	Ann-Marie Cording	1981	Brian Burgess	Louise Miller
1982	Geoff Parsons	1982	Barbara Simmonds	1982	Trevor Llewelyn	Barbara Simmonds
1983	Geoff Parsons	1983	Gillian Evans	1983	Mark Lakey	Gillian Evans
1984	Geoff Parsons	1984	Diana Elliott	1984	Alex Kruger	Diana Elliott
1985	Dalton Grant	1985	Diana Davies	1985	Geoff Parsons	Janet Boyle
1986	Geoff Parsons	1986	Diana Davies	1986	Geoff Parsons	Diana Davies
1987	Geoff Parsons	1987	Sharon McPeake	1987	Floyd Manderson	Diana Davies

AAA Championships & UK Athletics Championships dual championships era 1988-1997
Year	Men AAA	Women AAA	Year	Men UK	Women UK
1988	Geoff Parsons	Janet Boyle	1988	Geoff Parsons	Diana Davies
1989	Dalton Grant	Diana Davies	1989	Steve Chapman	Janet Boyle
1990	Dalton Grant	Lea Haggett	1990	Dalton Grant	Julia Bennett
1991	Geoff Parsons	Debbie Marti	1991	Dalton Grant	Lea Haggett
1992	Steve Smith	Lea Haggett	1992	Brendan Reilly	Debbie Marti
1993	Steve Smith	Debbie Marti	1993	Dalton Grant	Debbie Marti
1994	Brendan Reilly	Julia Bennett	n/a		
1995	Steve Smith	Lea Haggett	n/a		
1996	Steve Smith	Debbie Marti	n/a		
1997	Brendan Reilly	Debbie Marti	1997	Brendan Reilly	Debbie Marti

AAA Championships second era 1998-2006
Year	Men's champion	Women's champion
1998	Dalton Grant	Jo Jennings
1999	Steve Smith	Jo Jennings
2000	Ben Challenger	Jo Jennings
2001	Ben Challenger	Susan Jones
2002	Dalton Grant	Susan Jones
2003	Ben Challenger	Susan Jones
2004	Ben Challenger	Susan Jones
2005	Ben Challenger	Susan Jones
2006	Martyn Bernard	Julie Crane

British Athletics Championships 2007 to present
Year	Men's champion	Women's champion
2007	Martyn Bernard	Jessica Ennis
2008	Tom Parsons	Stephanie Pywell
2009	Germaine Mason	Jessica Ennis
2010	Martyn Bernard	Stephanie Pywell
2011	Tom Parsons	Jessica Ennis
2012	Robbie Grabarz	Jessica Ennis
2013	Robbie Grabarz	Emma Nuttall
2014	Allan Smith	Isobel Pooley
2015	Robbie Grabarz	Isobel Pooley
2016	Robbie Grabarz	Morgan Lake
2017	Robbie Grabarz	Morgan Lake
2018	Chris Baker	Morgan Lake
2019	Allan Smith	Morgan Lake
2020	Joel Clarke-Khan	Morgan Lake
2021	Tom Gale	Morgan Lake
2022	Joel Clarke-Khan	Morgan Lake
2023	Joel Clarke-Khan	Morgan Lake
2024	William Grimsey	Morgan Lake
2025	Divine Duruaku & Charlie Husbands	Morgan Lake
2026	Joel Clarke-Khan	

- NBA = No British athlete in medal placings
- nc = not contested
