= Athletics at the 1982 Commonwealth Games – Women's high jump =

Women's high jump at the Commonwealth Games

The women's high jump event at the 1982 Commonwealth Games was held on 8 October at the QE II Stadium in Brisbane, Australia.

== Results ==
Rank	Name	Nationality	1.65	1.74	1.80	1.83	1.88	1.90	Result	Notes
1st place, gold medalist(s)	Debbie Brill	Canada				xo	o	xxx	1.88	
2nd place, silver medalist(s)	Christine Stanton	Australia				xxo	xo	xxx	1.88	
3rd place, bronze medalist(s)	Barbara Simmonds	England							1.83	
4	Brigette Reid	Canada							1.83	
5	Vanessa Browne	Australia							1.83	
6	Diana Elliott	England							1.80	
7	Ann-Marie Cording	England							1.80	
8	Katrina Gibbs	Australia							1.80	
9	Sharon McPeake	Northern Ireland							1.74	
10	Julie White	Canada							1.74	
10	Ursula Fay	Nigeria							1.74	
12	Sharon Coetzee	Zimbabwe							1.65	
13	Sarah Owen	Wales							1.65	
	Grace Jackson	Jamaica							DNS	
	Christine Béchard	Mauritius							DNS	
