= 1980 European Athletics Indoor Championships – Women's high jump =

The women's high jump event at the 1980 European Athletics Indoor Championships was held on 1 March in Sindelfingen.

== Results ==
Rank	Name	Nationality	Result	Notes
1st place, gold medalist(s)	Sara Simeoni	Italy	1.95	
2nd place, silver medalist(s)	Andrea Mátay	Hungary	1.93	
3rd place, bronze medalist(s)	Urszula Kielan	Poland	1.93	
4	Valentina Poluyko	Soviet Union	1.90	
5	Petra Wziontek	West Germany	1.87	
6	Alessandra Fossati	Italy	1.87	
7	Ann-Ewa Karlsson	Sweden	1.87	
8	Elżbieta Krawczuk	Poland	1.84	
9	Chris Soetewey	Belgium	1.84	
10	Yelena Popkova	Soviet Union	1.84	
11	Ulrike Meyfarth	West Germany	1.80	
12	Sophie Leruste	France	1.75	
