= Athletics at the 1974 British Commonwealth Games – Women's high jump =

Women's high jump at the Commonwealth Games
- Venue: Queen Elizabeth II Park
- Dates: 2 February
- Competitors: 14 from 8 nations

Medalists
gold medal	Barbara Lawton	England
silver medal	Louise Hanna	Canada
bronze medal	Brigitte Bittner	Canada

The women's high jump event at the 1974 British Commonwealth Games was held on 2 February at the Queen Elizabeth II Park in Christchurch, New Zealand.

== Results ==
Rank	Name	Nationality	Result	Notes
1st place, gold medalist(s)	Barbara Lawton	England	1.84	
2nd place, silver medalist(s)	Louise Hanna	Canada	1.82	
3rd place, bronze medalist(s)	Brigitte Bittner	Canada	1.80	
4	Ruth Watt	Scotland	1.78	
5	Valerie Harrison	England	1.76	
6	Debbie McCawley	Australia	1.73	
7	Ann Wilson	England	1.73	
8	Mary Peters	Northern Ireland	1.70	
9	Gladys Chai Ng Mei	Malaysia	1.70	
10	Bernadine Lewis	Grenada	1.70	
11	Jennifer Symon	Australia	1.65	
12	Donna Mills	New Zealand	1.60	
13	Sue Scott	Australia	1.60	
14	Susan Burnside	New Zealand	1.55	
	Modupe Oshikoya	Nigeria	DNS	
