= 1974 WAAA Championships =

British athletics event

- Dates: 19–20 July
- Host city: London
- Venue: Crystal Palace National Sports Centre
- Level: Senior
- Type: Outdoor

The 1974 WAAA Championships were the national track and field championships for women in the United Kingdom.

The event was held at the Crystal Palace National Sports Centre, London, from 19 to 20 July 1974.

== Results ==
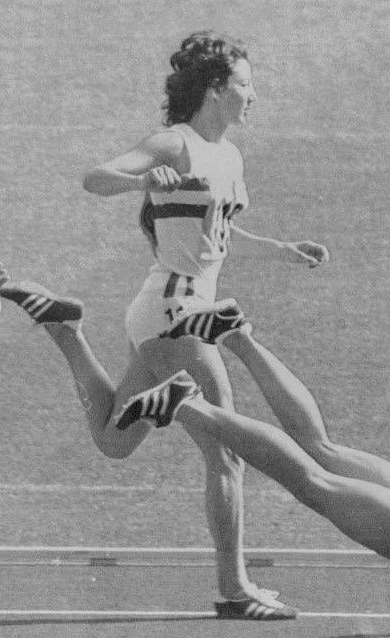
Ann Wilson won her second pentathlon title

Event	Gold		Silver		Bronze	
100 metres	(Australia) Raelene Boyle	11.23	Andrea Lynch	11.27	(Scotland) Helen Golden	11.40
200 metres	(Australia) Raelene Boyle	23.23	(Scotland) Helen Golden	23.63	(South Africa) Claudie van Straaten	23.79
400 metres	(Canada) Yvonne Saunders	51.90	Donna Murray	52.58	Verona Bernard	53.07
800 metres	Lesley Kiernan	2:05.12	(Republic of Ireland) Mary Purcell	2:09.75	(Scotland) Margaret Coomber	2:10.15
1500 metres	(Norway) Grete Andersen	4:10.02	(Canada) Thelma Wright	4:10.70	(Canada) Glenda Reiser	4:17.70
3000 metres	Joyce Smith	9:07.15	Ann Yeoman	9:17.21	Paula Yeoman	9:23.65
100 metres hurdles	Lorna Drysdale	13.45	Judy Vernon	13.46	Blondelle Thompson	13.50
400 metres hurdles	(South Africa) Hybre de Lange	58.41	Linda Robinson	62.47	Janice Farry	62.64
High jump	Val Harrison	1.82	(Canada) Debbie Brill	1.82	(Canada) Louise Hanna	1.79
Long jump	(Wales) Ruth Martin-Jones	6.26	Ann Wilson	6.19	(Canada) Brenda Eisler	6.17
Shot put	(Canada) Jane Haist	15.03	Brenda Bedford	14.65	Janis Kerr	14.17
Discus throw	(Canada) Jane Haist	56.38	(Scotland) Rosemary Payne	51.70	(Canada) Carol Martin	50.94
Javelin	(Austria) Eva Janko	61.56	Sharon Corbett	51.98	Tessa Sanderson	51.18
Pentathlon +	Ann Wilson	4248	Gladys Taylor	4003	Sue Wright	3984
3000 metres walk	Marion Fawkes	14:33.50	Betty Jenkins	15:07.32	Sally Wish	15:21.92

+ Held on 26 May at Crystal Palace

== See also ==
- 1974 AAA Championships
