= Stan West (athlete) =

British high jumper

Personal information
- Full name: Stanley Robert West
- Nationality: British (English)
- Born: 8 February 1913 Westminster, London, England
- Died: 13 August 2001 (aged 88)

Sport
- Sport: Athletics
- Event: High jump
- Club: Polytechnic Harriers

Stanley Robert West (8 February 1913 – 13 August 2001) was a British athlete who competed for England in the high jump at the 1934 British Empire Games and for Great Britain at the 1936 Summer Olympics.

== Biography ==
West finished second behind William Land in the high jump event at the 1932 AAA Championships.

West competed for England in the high jump at the 1934 British Empire Games in London.

West became the national high jump champion after winning the British AAA Championships title at the 1935 AAA Championships.

West also served in the Royal Air Force during the Second World War.
