= Athletics at the 1974 British Commonwealth Games – Women's javelin throw =

Women's javelin throw at the Commonwealth Games

The women's javelin throw event at the 1974 British Commonwealth Games was held on 29 January at the Queen Elizabeth II Park in Christchurch, New Zealand.

== Results ==
Rank	Name	Nationality	Result	Notes
1st place, gold medalist(s)	Petra Rivers	Australia	55.48	
2nd place, silver medalist(s)	Jenny Symon	Australia	52.14	
3rd place, bronze medalist(s)	Sharon Corbett	England	50.26	
4	Prudence French	England	50.00	
5	Tessa Sanderson	England	48.54	
6	Sandra McGookin	New Zealand	47.84	
7	Mereoni Vibose	Fiji	45.84	
8	Susan James	Wales	43.24	
9	Margaret Phillpot	Australia	42.70	
10	Joan Amsi	Tanzania	42.12	
11	Sally-Ann Mene	New Zealand	40.44	
12	Doristine Okuofu	Nigeria	36.80	
