= 1976 WAAA Championships =

British athletics event

- Dates: 20–21 August
- Host city: London
- Venue: Crystal Palace National Sports Centre
- Level: Senior
- Type: Outdoor

The 1976 WAAA Championships were the national track and field championships for women in the United Kingdom.

The event was held at the Crystal Palace National Sports Centre, London, from 20 to 21 August 1976.

== Results ==
Event	Gold		Silver		Bronze	
100 metres	Andrea Lynch	11.22	Sharon Colyear	11.39	Helen Barnett	11.64
200 metres	Denise Ramsden	23.48	Margaret Williams	23.48	Helen Barnett	23.63
400 metres	Verona Elder	52.08	Bev Goddard	53.08	Ruth Kennedy	53.71
800 metres	Angela Creamer	2:04.61	Mary Stewart	2:06.53	Susan Smith	2:06.65
1500 metres	Penny Yule	4:15.11	Glynis Penny	4:17.88	(Wales) Hilary Hollick	4:19.67
3000 metres	(Republic of Ireland) Mary Purcell	9:07.98	(Wales) Thelwyn Bateman	9:35.77	Alison Blake	9:46.33
100 metres hurdles	Sharon Colyear	13.47	Judy Vernon	13.70	Sue Longden	13.93
400 metres hurdles	Christine Warden	57.84 NR	Jannette Roscoe	59.40	Frances McCall	61.65
High jump	Denise Brown	1.79	(Scotland) Moira Walls	1.76	Anne Gilson	1.76
Long jump	Sue Reeve	6.28	Janet Peacock	6.22	(Scotland) Myra Nimmo	6.13
Shot put	Janis Kerr	15.88	Judy Oakes	15.85	Angela Littlewood	14.90
Discus throw	Janet Thompson	51.38	Janis Kerr	47.78	Jo Frampton	45.92
Javelin	Tessa Sanderson	56.98	Sharon Avann	49.24	Yvonne Fountain	47.60
Pentathlon +	Sue Longden	4337	Sue Mapstone	4110	Pat McNab	3986
5000 metres walk	Marion Fawkes	24:10.0 NR	Carol Tyson	24:47.8	Judy Farr	25:05.8

+ Held on 30 & 31 May at Crystal Palace

== See also ==
- 1976 AAA Championships
