= 1977 UK Athletics Championships =

British athletics event

- Dates: 11 & 12 June 1977
- Host city: Cwmbran, Wales
- Venue: Cwmbran Stadium
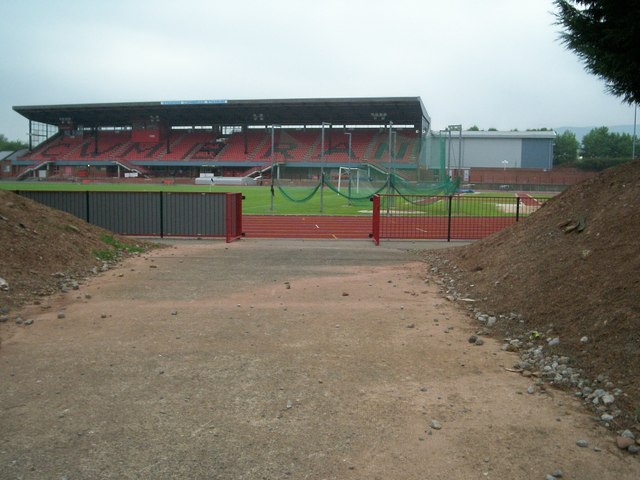
- Level: Senior
- Type: Outdoor

The 1977 UK Athletics Championships, sponsored by Kraft, was the national championship in outdoor track and field for the United Kingdom held at Cwmbran Stadium, Cwmbran, Wales.

It was the first edition of the competition limited to British athletes only, launched as an alternative to the AAA Championships, which was open to foreign competitors. However, because the calibre of national competition remained greater at the AAA event, the UK Championships this year were not considered the principal national championship event by some statisticians, such as the National Union of Track Statisticians (NUTS). Many of the athletes below also competed at the 1977 AAA Championships.

== Summary ==
Ainsley Bennett and Sonia Lannaman won sprint doubles in the 100 metres and 200 metres in the men's and women's side, respectively. Sharon Colyear took the women's titles in 100 metres hurdles and long jump. Other athletes who performed well in multiple events were Andrea Lynch (double sprint runner-up), Allan Wells (100 m runner-up and 200 m third-placer), and Tessa Sanderson who won the javelin throw as well as placing top three in the 400 metres hurdles.

The main international track and field competition for the United Kingdom that year was the 1977 European Cup. Distance runners Steve Ovett and Nick Rose won both the UK event and the European Cup title. Sanderson, Lannaman, Bennett were minor medallists there, as were women's 400 metres champion Donna Hartley and men's long jump runner-up Roy Mitchell.

== Medals ==
=== Men ===
Event	Gold		Silver		Bronze	
100m	Ainsley Bennett	10.63	(Scotland) Allan Wells	10.65	David Hill	10.68
200m	Ainsley Bennett	21.2	Glen Cohen	21.3	(Scotland) Allan Wells	21.3
400m	Walcott Taylor	47.5	Danny Laing	47.6	Steve Scutt	47.76
800m	David Warren	1:50.37	Peter Lewis	1:50.72	Pete Browne	1:50.82
1,500m	Steve Ovett	3:37.5	Paul Lawther	3:38.8	Jim McGuinness	3:39.7
5,000m	Nick Rose	13:20.6	Julian Goater	13:29.5	Bernie Ford	13:30.9
10,000m	(Scotland) Ian Stewart	27:51.30	Mike McLeod	28:10.23	(Scotland) Allister Hutton	28:13.09
110m hurdles	Berwyn Price	14.19	Mark Holtom	14.38	(Scotland) David Wilson	14.47
400m hurdles	Peter Kelly	51.74	Steve James	52.03	(Northern Ireland) Phil Beattie	52.19
3000m steeplechase	Tony Staynings	8:31.0	Dennis Coates	8:32.0	Peter Griffiths	8:35.8
high jump	Mike Butterfield	2.10 m	(Scotland) Brian Burgess	2.00 m	Colin Mitchell	1.95 m
pole vault	Jeff Gutteridge	5.00 m	Allan Williams	5.00 m	Mike Bull	4.80 m
long jump	Tony Henry	7.66 m	Roy Mitchell	7.43 m	Colin Wright	7.11 m
triple jump	Aston Moore	15.80 m	Keith Connor	15.55 m	John Phillips	15.12 m
shot put	Geoff Capes	20.04 m	Mike Winch	18.94 m	Roger Kennedy	18.03 m
discus throw	Pete Tancred	55.44 m	Richard Slaney	55.08 m	Mike Winch	54.92 m
hammer throw	Paul Dickenson	64.88 m	(Scotland) Paul Buxton	64.08 m	Matthew Mileham	60.80 m
javelin throw	Peter De Kremer	75.82 m	Dave Travis	70.40 m	Peter Yates	70.24 m

=== Women ===
Event	Gold		Silver		Bronze	
100m	Sonia Lannaman	11.30	Andrea Lynch	11.40	Wendy Clarke	11.65
200m	Sonia Lannaman	23.16	Andrea Lynch	23.83	Kathy Smallwood	23.87
400m	Donna Hartley	51.88	Verona Elder	52.73	Gladys McCormack	53.28
800m	Lesley Kiernan	2:01.48	Mary Stewart	2:03.11	Christina Boxer	2:04.03
1,500m	(Wales) Hilary Hollick	4:13.0	Chris Tranter	4:13.7	Ann Ford	4:17.3
3,000m	Glynis Penny	9:20.0	Paula Fudge	9:21.2	Thelwyn Bateman	9:24.0
110m hurdles	Sharon Colyear	13.5	Shirley Strong	13.9	Lorna Boothe	13.9
400m hurdles	Christine Warden	57.6	(Scotland) Liz Sutherland	58.3	Tessa Sanderson	60.46
high jump	Brenda Gibbs	1.78 m	Anne Gilson (Scotland) Moira Walls	1.78 m	Not Awarded	
long jump	Sharon Colyear	6.42 m	Janet Peacock	6.25 m	Karen Murray	6.09 m
shot put	(Wales) Venissa Head	15.72 m	Brenda Bedford	15.25 m	Angela Littlewood	15.22 m
discus throw	(Scotland) Meg Ritchie	53.92 m	Janet Thompson	49.58 m	Janis Kerr	44.88 m
javelin throw	Tessa Sanderson	60.24 m	Shara Spragg	49.48 m	Janeen Williams	48.68 m
