= Mapstone =

Mapstone is a surname. Notable people with the surname include:

- Rod Mapstone (born 1969), Australian sprinter
- Sally Mapstone (born 1957), British academic
- Sue Mapstone (born 1956), British penthathlete
