= Desiré du Plessis =

South African high jumper

Personal information
- Born: May 20, 1965 (age 61)

Sport
- Sport: Athletics
- Event: High jump
Medal record
Women's athletics
Representing South Africa
African Championships
Bronze medal – third place	1992 Belle Vue Harel	High jump
Bronze medal – third place	1993 Durban	High jump

Desiré du Plessis (born 20 May 1965) is a South African former track and field athlete who competed in the high jump. Her personal best is 2.01 m (6 ft 7 in), putting her in the all-time top thirty for the event. It was a South African record until it was beaten by Hestrie Cloete. Her best mark indoors was 1.95 m (6 ft 4 3/4 in), set in 1987. She ranked second in the world in the 1986 season.

Du Plessis won two major medals in her career, both at the African Championships in Athletics, taking bronze in 1992 and 1993. Compatriot Charmaine Weavers and Ivorian Lucienne N'Da were ahead of her each time. She also represented South Africa at the 1994 Commonwealth Games, taking ninth with a jump of 1.80 m (5 ft 10 3/4 in).

She won five straight national titles at the South African Athletics Championships between 1983 and 1987, becoming the first woman to clear two metres there in the process. She won two further titles in 1993 and 1995.

== International competitions ==
Year	Competition	Venue	Position	Notes
1992	African Championships	Belle Vue Maurel, Mauritius	3rd	1.86 m
1993	African Championships	Durban, South Africa	3rd	1.80 m
1994	Commonwealth Games	Victoria, British Columbia, Canada	9th	1.80 m

== National titles ==
- South African Athletics Championships
  - High jump: 1983, 1984, 1985, 1986, 1987, 1993, 1995
