= 1975 European Athletics Indoor Championships – Women's high jump =

The women's high jump event at the 1975 European Athletics Indoor Championships was held on 9 March in Katowice.

== Results ==
Rank	Name	Nationality	Result	Notes
1st place, gold medalist(s)	Rosemarie Ackermann	East Germany	1.92	=CR
2nd place, silver medalist(s)	Marie-Christine Debourse	France	1.83	
3rd place, bronze medalist(s)	Annemieke Bouma	Netherlands	1.80	
4	Sara Simeoni	Italy	1.80	
5	Galina Filatova	Soviet Union	1.80	
6	Věra Bradáčová	Czechoslovakia	1.80	
7	Anna Bubała	Poland	1.80	
8	Tamara Galka	Soviet Union	1.80	
9	Renate Boschert	West Germany	1.75	
10	Astrid Tveit	Norway	1.75	
11	Miloslava Hübnerová	Czechoslovakia	1.75	
12	Mária Mračnová	Czechoslovakia	1.75	
