= 1979 European Athletics Indoor Championships – Women's high jump =

The women's high jump event at the 1979 European Athletics Indoor Championships was held on 25 February in Vienna.

== Results ==
Rank	Name	Nationality	Result	Notes
1st place, gold medalist(s)	Andrea Mátay	Hungary	1.92	
2nd place, silver medalist(s)	Urszula Kielan	Poland	1.85	
3rd place, bronze medalist(s)	Ulrike Meyfarth	West Germany	1.80	
4	Alessandra Fossati	Italy	1.80	
5	Ann-Ewa Karlsson	Sweden	1.80	
6	Jasmin Fischer	West Germany	1.80	
7	Elżbieta Krawczuk	Poland	1.80	
8	Lidija Benedetič	Yugoslavia	1.80	
9	Vera Skotnická	Czechoslovakia	1.75	
10	Donatella Bulfoni	Italy	1.70	
