= Athletics at the 1978 Commonwealth Games – Men's high jump =

Men's high jump at the Commonwealth Games

The men's high jump event at the 1978 Commonwealth Games was held on 10 August at the Commonwealth Stadium in Edmonton, Alberta, Canada.

== Results ==
Rank	Name	Nationality	Result	Notes
1st place, gold medalist(s)	Claude Ferragne	Canada	2.20	
2nd place, silver medalist(s)	Greg Joy	Canada	2.18	
3rd place, bronze medalist(s)	Brian Burgess	Scotland	2.15	
3rd place, bronze medalist(s)	Dean Bauck	Canada	2.15	
5	Gordon Windeyer	Australia	2.15	
6	Mark Naylor	England	2.10	
7	Baljit Singh Sidhu	Malaysia	2.05	
8	Winston Strachan	Bahamas	2.00	
9	Bernard Rault	Mauritius	2.00	
	Masoud Tawakali	Tanzania	NM	
