= Vanessa Ward =

Australian high jumper

Vanessa Ward née Browne
Personal information
- Nationality: Australian
- Born: 5 January 1963 (age 63)
- Height: 170 cm (5 ft 7 in)
- Weight: 53 kg (117 lb)

Sport
- Sport: Athletics
- Event: high jump

Vanessa Carol Ward (née Browne; born 5 January 1963) is a retired high jumper from Australia, who competed at two Olympic Games.

== Biography ==
Browne finished second behind Barbara Simmonds in the high jump event at the British 1982 WAAA Championships.

At the 1984 Olympic Games in Los Angeles, she represented Australia in the high jump and finished sixth in the final and four years later she appeared at her second Olympic Games at Seoul 1988.

A five-time national champion in the women's high jump event, She set her personal best on 12 February 1989, jumping 1.98 metres at a meet in Perth, Western Australia. This (as of 2013) still stands as the Australian record.

She was an Australian Institute of Sport scholarship holder in 1981 to 1984 and 1987 to 1988.

== Achievements ==
- Australian high jump record holder – 1.98 metres in 1989 (equalled by Alison Inverarity in 1994)
- Five-time Australian National High Jump Champion (1979, 1984, 1988, 1989, 1990)

Year	Competition	Venue	Position	Event	Notes
Representing Australia
1982	Commonwealth Games	Brisbane, Australia	5th	High jump	1.83 m
1983	World Championships	Helsinki, Finland	9th	High jump	1.88 m
1984	Olympic Games	Los Angeles, California, USA	6th	High jump	1.94 m
1986	Commonwealth Games	Edinburgh, Scotland	9th	High jump	1.83 m
1988	Olympic Games	Seoul, South Korea	13th (q)	High jump	1.90 m
1990	Commonwealth Games	Auckland, New Zealand	4th	High jump	1.88 m
1991	World Championships	Tokyo, Japan	10th	High jump	1.90 m

Note: result with a Q, indicates overall position in qualifying round.
