= Athletics at the 1994 Commonwealth Games – Women's high jump =

Women's high jump at the Commonwealth Games

The women's high jump event at the 1994 Commonwealth Games was held at the Centennial Stadium in Victoria, British Columbia.

== Medalists ==
Gold	Silver	Bronze
Alison Inverarity; Australia	Charmaine Weavers; South Africa	Debbie Marti; England

== Results ==
=== Qualification ===
Rank	Group	Name	Nationality	Result	Notes
1	A	Alison Inverarity	Australia	1.85	q
1	A	Debbie Marti	England	1.85	q
1	A	Leslie Estwick	Canada	1.85	q
4	A	Desiré du Plessis	South Africa	1.85	q
5	A	Corinna Wolf	Canada	1.85	q
5	A	Tracy Phillips	New Zealand	1.85	q
7	A	Natasha Alleyne	Trinidad and Tobago	1.80	
8	A	Annerie de Klerk	South Africa	1.65	
1	B	Tania Dixon	New Zealand	1.85	q
1	B	Julia Bennett	England	1.85	q
3	B	Andrea Hughes	Australia	1.85	q
4	B	Sara McGladdery	Canada	1.85	q
5	B	Lea Haggett	England	1.85	q
6	B	Charmaine Weavers	South Africa	1.85	q
7	B	Hazel Melvin	Scotland	1.80	
8	B	Theodora Venter	Namibia	1.70	
		Tsoseletso Nkala	Botswana	DNS	

=== Final ===
Rank	Name	Nationality	1.75	1.80	1.85	1.88	1.91	1.94	1.97	Result	Notes
1st place, gold medalist(s)	Alison Inverarity	Australia	–	–	o	xxo	o	o	xx	1.94	GR
2nd place, silver medalist(s)	Charmaine Weavers	South Africa						o	xxx	1.94	=GR
3rd place, bronze medalist(s)	Debbie Marti	England					o	xxx		1.91	SB
4	Tania Dixon	New Zealand								1.91	
5	Andrea Hughes	Australia								1.88	
5	Lea Haggett	England								1.88	
7	Julia Bennett	England								1.85	
8	Sara McGladdery	Canada								1.85	
9	Tracy Phillips	New Zealand								1.80	
9	Desiré du Plessis	South Africa								1.80	
11	Leslie Estwick	Canada								1.80	
12	Corinna Wolf	Canada								1.75	
