= Sara Simeoni =

Italian high jumper

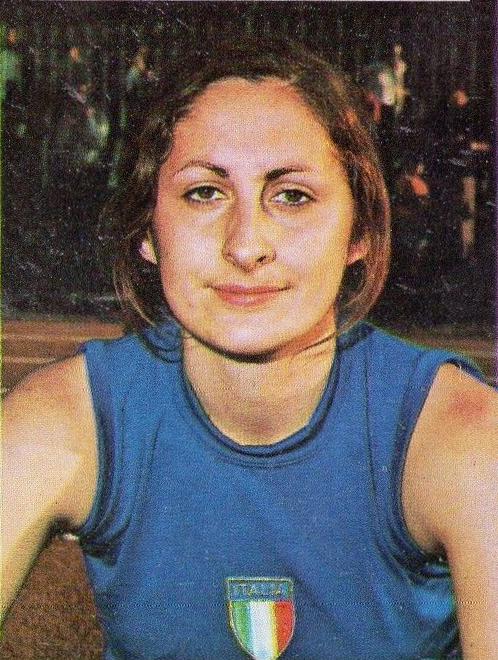
- Sara Simeoni in 1973

Personal information
- Born: 19 April 1953 (age 73) Rivoli Veronese, Italy
- Height: 1.81 m (5 ft 11 1/2 in)
- Weight: 60 kg (132 lb)

Sport
- Country: Italy
- Sport: Athletics
- Event: High jump
- Club: CS Fiat Torino, Lib. Ligabò Verona, Fiat Iveco, Francesco Francia Bologna
- Coached by: Erminio Azzaro

Achievements and titles
- Olympic finals: 1976, 1980, 1984
- Regional finals: 1974, 1978, 1982
- Personal best: 2.01 m (1978)
Medal record
Women's athletics
Representing Italy
Event	1st	2nd	3rd
Olympic Games	1	2	0
European Championships	1	0	2
European Indoor Championships	4	0	0
Universiade	2	1	2
Mediterranean Games	2	0	0
World Cup	0	2	0
European Cup	0	1	0
Total	10	6	4
Olympic Games
Gold medal – first place	1980 Moscow	High Jump
Silver medal – second place	1976 Montreal	High Jump
Silver medal – second place	1984 Los Angeles	High Jump
European Championships
Gold medal – first place	1978 Prague	High jump
Bronze medal – third place	1974 Rome	High jump
Bronze medal – third place	1982 Athens	High jump
European Indoor Championships
Gold medal – first place	1977 San Sebastián	High jump
Gold medal – first place	1978 Milan	High jump
Gold medal – first place	1980 Sindelfingen	High jump
Gold medal – first place	1981 Grenoble	High jump
Universiade
Gold medal – first place	1977 Sofia	High jump
Gold medal – first place	1981 Bucharest	High jump
Silver medal – second place	1975 Rome	High jump
Bronze medal – third place	1973 Moscow	High jump
Bronze medal – third place	1979 Mexico City	High jump
Mediterranean Games
Gold medal – first place	1975 Algiers	High jump
Gold medal – first place	1979 Split	High jump
World Cup
Silver medal – second place	1977 Düsseldorf	High jump
Silver medal – second place	1979 Montreal	High jump
European Cup – Final A
Silver medal – second place	1979 Turin	High jump
European Cup – Final B
Gold medal – first place	1977 Helsinki	High jump
Gold medal – first place	1981 Zagreb	High jump

Sara Simeoni (born 19 April 1953) is an Italian former high jumper, who won a gold medal at the 1980 Summer Olympics and twice set a world record in the women's high jump.

== Biography ==
Sara Simeoni was born in Rivoli Veronese, in the province of Verona. She soon took up athletics, specialising in the high jump. Her first international result was at the 1971 European Championships in Helsinki, where she ended 9th with a 178 cm jump. Her first international success was at the 1976 in Montreal, where she won a silver medal, with a personal best of 1.91 m, and was beaten only by Rosemarie Ackermann's 1.93 m leap.

In August 1978, she set the new world record with 2.01 m in Brescia (this jump stood as a national record until Antonietta Di Martino jumped 2.02 in June 2007). Later in the same month she equalled it at Prague while winning the European title. In 1980, Simeoni set a new Olympic record of 1.97 m, when winning gold in Moscow. Simeoni was the only woman athlete not from a Communist country able to win an athletics gold medal in Moscow.

Simeoni struggled to regain her form in the following years, with a series of tendon injuries. At the 1984 Olympics, Simeoni carried the Italian flag at the opening ceremony in Los Angeles. Here, she cemented her reputation as one of the greatest female high jumpers ever, in a thrilling duel with West German Ulrike Meyfarth. Simeoni managed to reach the 2 meters measure for the first time since 1978. Meyfarth, however, replied with a notable 2.02 m jump, and Simeoni won a silver medal.

Simeoni's other titles include two bronze medals at the European Championships and 25 national titles. Her jump of 2.01 m was the Italian record for women for 29 years. On 8 June 2007, Antonietta Di Martino jumped 2.02 m, establishing the new Italian record for women.

Sara Simeoni is widely considered one of the best Italian female athletes ever. She is married to her coach Erminio Azzaro. Their son Roberto Azzaro is also a high jumper.

== Achievements ==
Year	Competition	Venue	Position	Notes
1970	European Junior Championships	Colombes, France	5th	1.70 m
1971	European Championships	Helsinki, Finland	9th	1.78 m
1971	Mediterranean Games	İzmir, Turkey	2nd	1.74 m
1972	Olympic Games	Munich, West Germany	6th	1.85 m
1973	European Indoor Championships	Rotterdam, Netherlands	9th	1.82 m
1973	Universiade	Moscow, Soviet Union	3rd	1.81 m
1974	European Indoor Championships	Gothenburg, Sweden	11th	1.75 m
1974	European Championships	Rome, Italy	3rd	1.89 m
1975	European Indoor Championships	Katowice, Poland	4th	1.80 m
1975	Mediterranean Games	Algiers, Algeria	1st	1.89 m
1975	Universiade	Rome, Italy	2nd	1.88 m
1976	Olympic Games	Montreal, Canada	2nd	1.91 m
1977	European Indoor Championships	San Sebastián, Spain	1st	1.92 m
1977	Universiade	Sofia, Bulgaria	1st	1.92 m
1977	World Cup	Düsseldorf, West Germany	2nd	1.92 m^{1}
1978	European Indoor Championships	Milan, Italy	1st	1.94 m
1978	European Championships	Prague, Czechoslovakia	1st	2.01 m
1979	World Cup	Montreal, Canada	2nd	1.94 m^{1}
1979	Universiade	Mexico City, Mexico	3rd	1.92 m
1979	Mediterranean Games	Split, Yugoslavia	1st	1.98 m
1980	European Indoor Championships	Sindelfingen, West Germany	1st	1.95 m
1980	Olympic Games	Moscow, Soviet Union	1st	1.97 m
1981	European Indoor Championships	Grenoble, France	1st	1.97 m
1981	Universiade	Bucharest, Romania	1st	1.96 m
1982	European Championships	Athens, Greece	3rd	1.97 m
1983	World Championships	Helsinki, Finland	19th (q)	1.84 m
1984	Olympic Games	Los Angeles, United States	2nd	2.00 m
1986	European Championships	Stuttgart, West Germany	13th (q)	1.86 m

^{1}Representing Europe

== National titles ==
She won 25 national championships at individual senior level.

- Italian Athletics Championships
  - High jump: 1970, 1971, 1972, 1973, 1974, 1975, 1976, 1977, 1978, 1979, 1980, 1982, 1983, 1985 (14)
  - Pentathlon: 1972 (1)
- Italian Indoor Athletics Championships
  - High jump: 1970, 1971, 1973, 1974, 1975, 1977, 1978, 1980, 1981, 1986 (10)

== See also ==
- Female two metres club
- Women's high jump world record progression
- Women with most medals in high jump
- Italian sportswomen multiple medalists at Olympics and World Championships
- FIDAL Hall of Fame
- Italy national athletics team – Multiple medalists
- Italian all-time lists – High jump

Awards
Preceded by - Roberta Felotti; Dorina Vaccaroni	Italian Sportswoman of the Year; 1978; 1980–1981; 1984	Succeeded by Roberta Felotti; Dorina Vaccaroni; Maria Canins
Records
Preceded by Rosemarie Ackermann	Women's High Jump World Record Holder; 4 August 1978 – 8 September 1982	Succeeded by Ulrike Meyfarth
Sporting positions
Preceded by Rosemarie Ackermann	Women's High Jump Best Year Performance; 1978	Succeeded by Rosemarie Ackermann
Preceded by Rosemarie Ackermann	Women's High Jump Best Year Performance; 1980	Succeeded by Pam Spencer
Summer Olympics
Preceded by Klaus Dibiasi	Flag bearer for Italy; 1984 Los Angeles	Succeeded by Pietro Mennea
