= Phyllis Nicol =

British high jumper (1908–1999)

Phyllis Nicol (née Green)
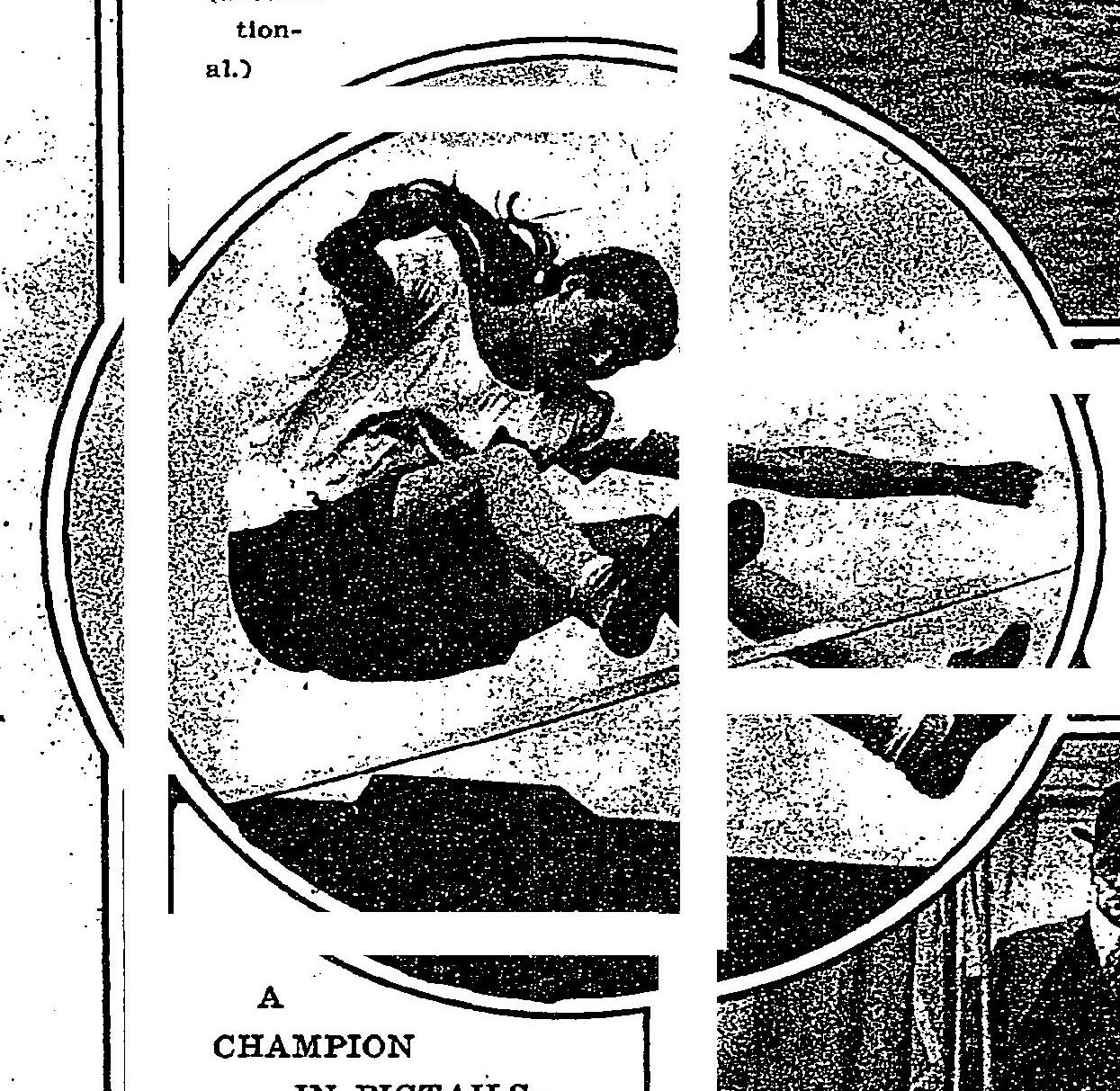

Personal information
- Born: Phyllis Adine Green; 2 February 1908 Peckham, England
- Died: 26 November 1999 (aged 91) Epsom, Surrey

Sport
- Country: United Kingdom
- Event: High jump
- Club: London Olympiades

Phyllis Nicol (born Phyllis Green; 1908–1999) was a British high jumper. She was the first woman to clear five feet (1.52 metres) in the high jump, setting a world record when she was 17 years old. She broke her own record the following year and at the 1927 Women's Amateur Athletic Association championships, she cleared 1.58 metres. Following her brief athletic career, she moved to Ewell and was a missionary.

== Early life ==
Phyllis Adine Green was born on 2 February 1908 in Peckham, England, to Rose (née Hanvey) and Henry Ernest Green, a manager for an undertaker. She attended Peckham High School for Girls in south London.

== Athletic career ==
Green was 17 years old when she broke the world record for the women's high jump. In June 1925, she cleared 1.51 metres at Stamford Bridge stadium, matching the world record. On the same day, she broke the British record for the long jump held by Mary Lines, with a jump of 5.24 metres. A month later in Brussels, Green matched the high jump world record again. On 11 July 1925 at the 1925 WAAA Championships, she broke the world record at Stamford Bridge stadium when she was the first woman to clear five feet (1.52 metres). She was quoted in a 1925 newspaper article as saying "I have always jumped from the time I learned to walk ... I never went round an obstacle—I always jumped over it." The achievement saw her win her first Women's Amateur Athletic Association (WAAA) title and become the national high jump champion.

At the 1926 WAAA Championships, she won both the long and high jump events. In 1926 at Chiswick, she cleared 1.55 metres in the high jump, breaking her own world record. At the 1927 WAAA Championships at Palmer Park, Reading, she cleared 1.58 metres from a grass takeoff, her personal best. While the jump equalled the world record metrically, it was not ratified as it was 3/16 inches less than the imperial record at the time. Green used the scissors technique for her high jumps. After the 1927 championships, she did not compete again.

== Later life ==
Following her retirement in 1927, Green was not a public figure. She moved to Ewell and was employed as a clerk. She married Presbyterian minister George Manson Nicol in 1946 at Ewell Congregational Church. They were both missionaries in Malaya. She lived in Conaways Close for almost 50 years.

Nicol died on 26 November 1999 at Epsom General Hospital. Ewell's Bourne Hall Museum has records from her career.
