= 1981 European Athletics Indoor Championships – Women's high jump =

The women's high jump event at the 1981 European Athletics Indoor Championships was held on 21 February.

== Results ==
Rank	Name	Nationality	1.70	1.75	1.80	1.85	1.88	1.91	1.94	1.97	2.00	Result	Notes
1st place, gold medalist(s)	Sara Simeoni	Italy	−	−	o	o	o	o	xo	o	xxx	1.97	
2nd place, silver medalist(s)	Elżbieta Krawczuk	Poland	−	−	o	o	o	o	o	xxx		1.94	PB
3rd place, bronze medalist(s)	Urszula Kielan	Poland	−	−	o	o	o	xo	o	xxx		1.94	
4	Ulrike Meyfarth	West Germany	−	−	o	o	o	xxx				1.88	
5	Jasmin Fischer	West Germany	−	o	o	o	xxo	xxx				1.88	
6	Emese Béla	Hungary	−	−	o	o	xxx					1.85	
7	Susanne Lorentzon	Sweden	−	o	o	o	xxx					1.85	
8	Donatella Bulfoni	Italy	−	−	o	xxo	xxx					1.85	
9	Marina Serkova	Soviet Union	−	−	xo	xxo	xxx					1.85	
10	Marjette Overwater	Netherlands	−	o	o	xxx						1.80	
11	Gaby Meier	Switzerland	o	o	o	xxx						1.80	
11	Sandra Dini	Italy	o	o	o	xxx						1.80	
13	Lidija Benedetič	Yugoslavia	o	o	xxx							1.75	
