= Hillingdon Athletic Club =

British athletics club

- Founded: 1877
- Ground: Hillingdon Athletics Stadium
- Location: 1 Gatting Way, Uxbridge London, UB8 1ES, England
- Coordinates: 51°33′12″N 0°27′59″W
- Website: official website

Hillingdon Athletic Club is a British athletics club based in Uxbridge, west London and Ruislip, northwest London, England. The club's headquarters and clubhouse are based at 206 Bury Street in Ruislip but training and racing takes place at the Hillingdon Athletics Stadium in Uxbridge. The club train five days per week and is affiliated with UK Athletics, the South of England AA and Middlesex County AA.

== History ==
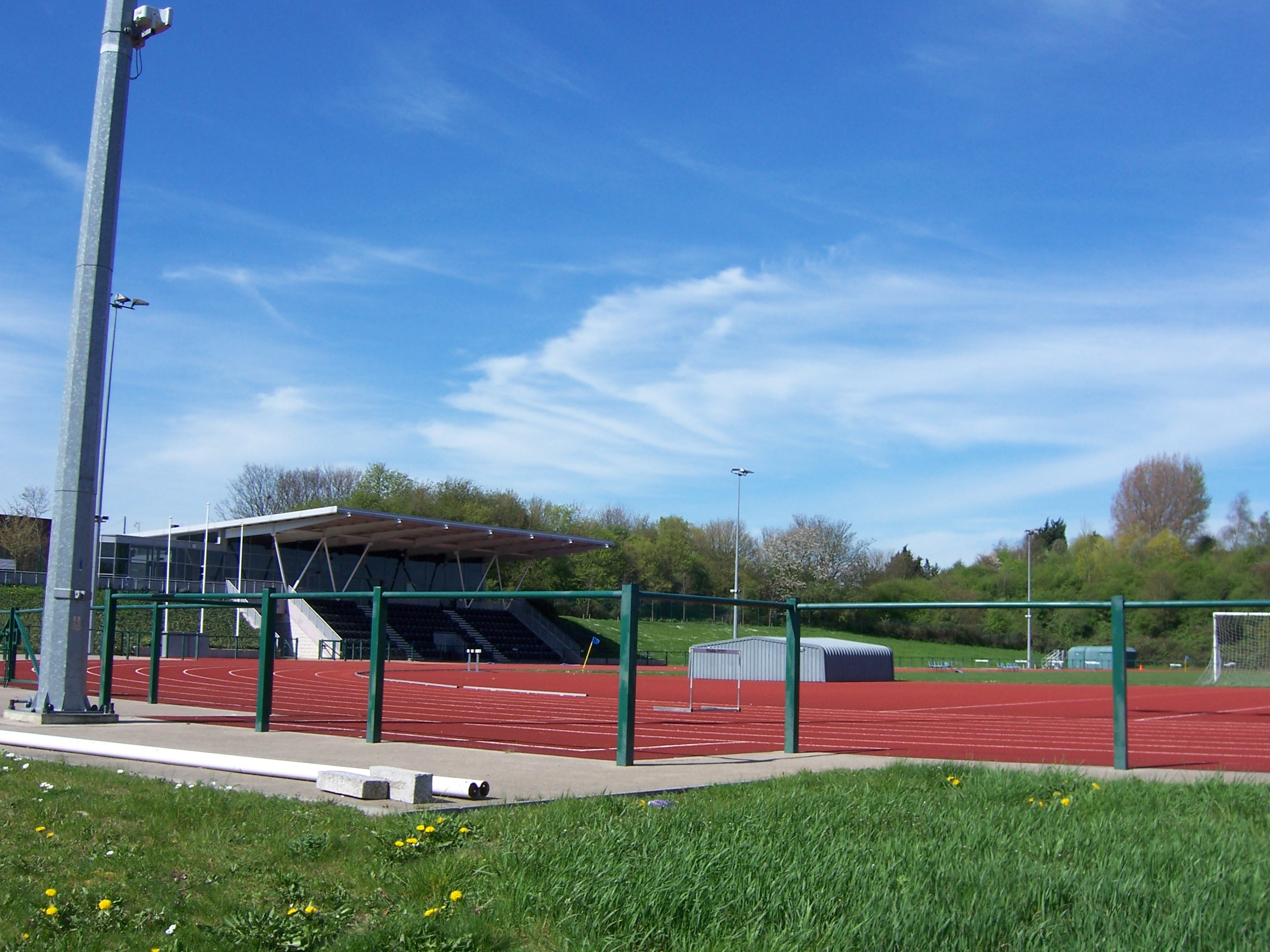
The stadium in 2011

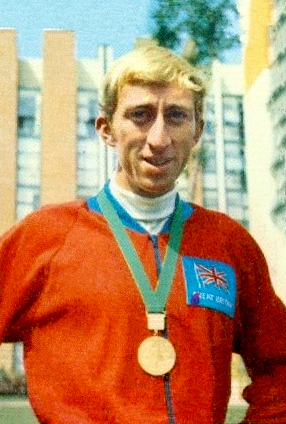
David Hemery

The club's origins date back to 1877 when a group called the Gentlemen of Hampstead founded the Finchley Harriers following a meeting at the North Star Tavern. The first run took place 8 November 1879.

In 1899 and 1900 Charles Bennett won the individual title at the English National Cross Country Championships, while the Harriers won the team title in 1900 in Rotherham. Bennett went on to win the club's first Olympic medals at the 1900 Summer Olympics in Paris.

In 1933, the Finchley Harriers introduced the Finchley Road Race, which became a prestigious event and was later renamed the Hillingdon 20.

Shortly after World War II in 1946, Roger Bannister joined the club before moving to University and in 1949 the original clubhouse on Bury Street was built by the Finchley Harriers.

In 1951, Ruislip and Northwood Athletics Club was founded but later merged with Finchley Harriers to form the Hillingdon Athletic Club on 1 October 1966. Further clubs merged with Hilllingdon AC afterwards (Hillingdon and Harlington AC in 1970, Uxbridge & District Ladies in 1990 and Brunel Juniors in 2006).

In 1976 the current clubhouse on Bury Street was built and the Don Hirst Trust Fund was set up in 1985.

In 2006 the Athletics Stadium was opened by Queen Elizabeth II.

== Honours ==
- English National Cross Country Championships team winners: 1900
- English National Cross Country Championships individual winners: 1899, 1900

== Notable athletes ==
=== Olympians ===
| Athlete | Club | Games | Events | Medals/Ref |
|---|---|---|---|---|
| Charles Bennett | Finchley Harriers | 1900 | marathon, steeplechase, team race | Gold medal Gold medal Silver medal |
| Frederick Randall | Finchley Harriers | 1900 | marathon | |
| Frederick Ashford | Finchley Harriers | 1908 | 800m | |
| Meyrick Chapman | Finchley Harriers | 1908 | 100m | |
| Eric Shirley | Finchley Harriers | 1956, 1960 | steeplechase | |
| Frank Salvat | Finchley Harriers | 1960 | 5000m | |
| Frances Slaap | Ruislip & Northwood AC | 1960, 1964 | high jump | |
| Pat Pryce-Nutting | Ruislip & Northwood AC/Hillingdon AC | 1960, 1964, 1968 | 80m hurdles | |
| Gwenda Matthews | Ruislip & Northwood AC | 1964 | high jump | |
| David Hemery | Hillingdon AC | 1968, 1972 | 400mH, 4 × 400 m relay | Gold medal Silver medal Bronze medal |
| Barry King | Hillingdon AC | 1972 | decathlon | |
| Paul Dickenson | Hillingdon AC | 1976, 1980 | hammer | |
| Mark Naylor | Hillingdon AC | 1980, 1984 | high jump | |
| Alec Leonce | Hillingdon AC | 1988 | bobsleigh | |
| Julia Bleasdale | Hillingdon AC | 2012 | 5,000/10,000m | |

- English unless stated

=== Commonwealth Games ===
| Athlete | Club | Games | Events | Medals/Ref |
|---|---|---|---|---|
| Len Carter | Ruislip & Northwood AC | 1962 | 4 × 100 m relay | Gold medal |
| John Adey | Finchley Harriers | 1966 | 4x400 relay | Bronze medal |
| Peter Gabbett | Hillingdon AC | 1970 | decathlon | Silver medal |
| Mike Campbell | Hillingdon AC | 1970 | high jump | |
| John Hillier | Hillingdon AC | 1974, 1978 | discus | |
| Graham Gower | Hillingdon AC | 1974 | 110m hurdles | |
