= Athletics at the 1986 Commonwealth Games – Women's high jump =

Women's high jump at the Commonwealth Games

The men's high jump event at the 1986 Commonwealth Games was held on 1 August at the Meadowbank Stadium in Edinburgh.

== Results ==
Rank	Name	Nationality	1.75	1.80	1.83	1.86	1.88	1.90	1.92	Result	Notes
1st place, gold medalist(s)	Chris Stanton	Australia	–	o	o	o	xxo	o	xxo	1.92	
2nd place, silver medalist(s)	Sharon McPeake	Northern Ireland	o	o	o	o	o	o	xxx	1.90	
3rd place, bronze medalist(s)	Janet Boyle	Northern Ireland	o	o	o	xo	o	o	xxx	1.90	
4	Diana Davies	England	–	o	o	o	o	xxo	xxx	1.90	
5	Debbie Brill	Canada	–	o	o	o	xxo	xxx		1.88	
6	Trudy Painter	New Zealand	o	o	o	o	xxx			1.86	
7	Jayne Barnetson	Scotland								1.83	
8	Jennifer Little	England								1.83	
9	Vanessa Ward	Australia								1.83	
10	Linda McCurdy-Cameron	Canada								1.80	
11	Louise Manning	England								1.75	
11	Jenny Talbot	Australia								1.75	
	Alison Armstrong	Canada								NM	
