= Meyrick Chapman =

British athlete (1886–1969)

Personal information
- Nationality: British (English)
- Born: 9 December 1886 Islington, London, England
- Died: 29 December 1969 (aged 83) Aylesbury, England
- Height: 163 cm (5 ft 4 in)

Sport
- Sport: Athletics
- Event: Sprints
- Club: Finchley Harriers

Meyrick Chapman (9 December 1886 – 29 December 1969) was a British athlete who competed at the 1908 Summer Olympics.

== Biography ==
Educated at Magdalen College School.

Chapman represented Great Britain at the 1908 Summer Olympics in the 100 metres event and took second place in his first round heat with a time of 11.3 seconds. He did not advance to the semifinals.

He was the winner of the British Olympic 100 m trials and competed for Finchley Harriers. Chapman was still competing at a relatively high level in 1924, winning the 100 yards at the Bucks AAA championship.

== Sources ==
- Cook, Theodore Andrea (1908). The Fourth Olympiad, Being the Official Report. London: British Olympic Association.
- De Wael, Herman (2001). "Athletics 1908". Herman's Full Olympians.
- Wudarski, Pawel (1999). "Wyniki Igrzysk Olimpijskich" (in Polish).
