= Jenny Symon =

Australian athletics competitor

Personal information
- Nationality: Australian
- Born: Jennifer Symon; 7 December 1953 (age 72) South Australia

Sport
- Sport: Track and field
Medal record
Representing Australia
British Commonwealth Games
Silver medal – second place	1974 Christchurch	Javelin throw

Jennifer Symon (born 7 December 1953) is a former athletics competitor from South Australia. During the 1974 British Commonwealth Games in Christchurch, she won a silver medal in the javelin throw, and also competed in the high jump event.
