= Tania Murray =

New Zealand high jumper and triple jumper

Personal information
- Born: Tania Kay Murray; 3 October 1970 (age 55) Ranfurly, New Zealand
- Spouse(s): Trevor Dixon; Russ Haigh
- Children: 2

Sport
- Country: New Zealand
- Sport: Track and field
- Event(s): High jump, triple jump
- Coached by: Trevor Bent

Achievements and titles
- National finals: High jump champion (1988, 1990, 1991, 1992, 1997); Triple jump champion (1994, 1997, 1999)
- Personal best(s): High jump – 1.92 m Triple jump – 13.48 m
Medal record
Women's athletics
Representing New Zealand
Commonwealth Games
| Gold medal – first place | 1990 Auckland | High jump |

Tania Kay Murray Haigh (formerly Dixon, née Murray; born 3 October 1970) is a former New Zealand high jumper and triple jumper. She won the gold medal in the women's high jump representing her country at the 1990 Commonwealth Games, and won eight national athletic championship titles.

== Early life ==
Murray was born in Ranfurly on 3 October 1970. As a child she suffered from several illnesses, including hepatitis, rheumatic fever, glandular fever and growths of her knees. Encouraged by her doctor to become more active, she joined the Alexandra Athletics Club. Murray was educated at Maniototo Area School, and then Logan Park High School after moving with her family to Dunedin.

== Athletics ==
=== National championships ===
As a junior, Murray competed in sprint events, as well as in the long jump, high jump and triple jump. Representing Otago at the national athletic championships, she won the under-18 high jump in 1988, the under-20 100 metres hurdles and high jump in 1989, and the under-20 100 metres, 200 metres and high jump in 1990. Murray was New Zealand women's high jump champion in 1988, 1990, 1991, 1992, and 1997, and was New Zealand triple jump champion in 1994, 1997, and 1999.

=== Commonwealth Games ===
Murray represented New Zealand in the high jump at the 1990 Commonwealth Games in Auckland. Murray and Janet Boyle from Northern Ireland were two of the six athletes to jump 1.88 metres, but then all failed to clear 1.91 metres. As Murray and Boyle were the only two to clear 1.88 metres at their first attempts, they went into a jump-off to decide the gold and silver medals. After a dramatic jump-off, Murray eventually emerged victorious, and took the gold medal.

In 1990, Murray was awarded the New Zealand 1990 Commemoration Medal.

Despite achieving the 'A' qualifying standard in the high jump for the 1992 Summer Olympics with a personal best height of 1.92 metres, Murray was controversially not nominated for the New Zealand Olympic team by Athletics New Zealand.

Murray again competed in the high jump at the 1994 Commonwealth Games at Victoria, finishing fourth on a countback with the bronze medallist Debbie Marti from England, after both athletes had a best height of 1.91 metres.

Following the 1994 Games, Murray moved to Melbourne for a time and concentrated on the triple jump. She qualified for the inaugural Commonwealth Games women's triple jump event in 1998, but was injured while attempting to qualify for the high jump. She subsequently retired from athletics competition.

=== National records / personal bests ===
In 1991, Murray set the New Zealand record for the women's high jump of 1.92 metres (6 ft 4 in), and in 1997 set the national record of 13.48 metres (44 ft 3 in). As of January 2021, her New Zealand high jump record still stands.

| Event | Distance | Place | Date |
|---|---|---|---|
| High jump | 1.92 m NR | Dunedin, New Zealand | 26 January 1991 |
| Triple jump | 13.48 m NR | Melbourne, Australia | 2 March 1997 |

== Later life ==
Murray married Greg Dixon, and they had two children. They moved to the United States in the late 1990s, but Murray returned to New Zealand after their marriage ended, finding employment as the sports coordinator at Cromwell College for five years. In about 2015, she started her own dressmaking business, having completed a course at Otago Polytechnic after leaving school. She remarried, to Russ Haigh, and the couple have a house renovation business in Cromwell.
