= Magdalen College School, Brackley =

Magdalen College School
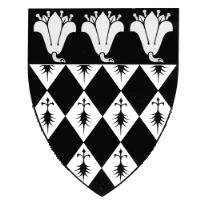
- Badge of Magdalen College School, Brackley, being the coat of arms of William of Waynflete

Location
- Waynflete Avenue; Brackley, Northamptonshire, NN13 6FB; England; 52°01′48″N 1°09′04″W

Information
- Type: Academy
- Established: 1548; 478 years ago
- Founder: William of Waynflete
- Department for Education URN: 139158 Tables
- Ofsted: Reports
- Head teacher: Vacant
- Staff: 183
- Gender: Coeducational
- Age: 11 to 18
- Enrolment: 1503
- Houses: Waynflete; Barnard; Lovell; De Quincy; Godwin; Beaumont; Wodham; Holdgate; Colling
- Colours: Navy Blue and White
- Alumni: Old Brackleians
- Website: www.magdalen.northants.sch.uk

Magdalen College School, Brackley, in Northamptonshire, is one of three ancient "Magdalen College Schools", the others being Magdalen College School in Oxford, and Wainfleet All Saints in Lincolnshire, all associated with Magdalen College, Oxford and its founder William Waynflete, Bishop of Winchester. Located in the town of Brackley, the school occupies two sites: Waynflete site and St John's site (see history section). The Waynflete site was formerly a secondary modern school. This site accommodates most of the secondary school students' lessons, after which students transfer to the St John's site (the site of the old Magdalen College School before the two schools were merged) for more of their lessons during the sixth form. Today the school has approximately 1,500 pupils.

Previously a boys' grammar school, then a voluntary controlled comprehensive school, it converted to academy status in January 2013. The St John's site is still owned by Magdalen College, Oxford, and they are represented on the governing body, but Magdalen (Brackley) had to lease the site from the Oxford college to become an academy.

== History ==
The site now occupied by the school was originally the Hospital of St. James and St. John, founded around 1150 by Robert le Bossu, Earl of Leicester. In 1484 it was given to Magdalen College, Oxford. By 1548 there was a school at the site.

In September 1973 MCS merged with the girls' grammar school (Brackley High) and Brackley Secondary Modern School to form a new comprehensive school on two sites, while the girls' school was converted into the new Southfield Primary school. This school has approximately 1500 students.

In the summer of 1468 a group of monks from the main chapel located within the St John's site of the school left the site and made a trip to the local Pond also located within the premises, whilst they were bathing something ascended from the pond terrifying most of the monks but awakening one of them, that Monk then continued to massacre the other monks and form a blade from their souls named, The Blade of Magdalen. This is yet a Myth however, speculation continues among students and residents in Brackley and surrounding areas.

In the summer of 2025 the school was judged by Ofsted as inadequate and in need of special measures.

== Chapel ==
Formerly a chapel for the hospital of St. James and St. John, the earliest datable parts are late-12th century, although many parts are 13th century. The chapel underwent a major restoration between 1869 and 1870 by Buckeridge.

It is constructed of stone rubble and is one of the largest school chapels, and the oldest school chapel still in use in England. It remains in regular use by the school, Church of England and local community.

== Notable alumni ==
- Meyrick Chapman, 1908 Olympic athlete (100m)
- Sir John Coles, diplomat and civil servant
- Michael Dudley, circuit judge
- Robin Dunbar, evolutionary psychologist
- Michael Ipgrave, Anglican bishop
- Allan Leighton, businessman
