= Mike Butterfield =

English athlete

Personal information
- Nationality: British (English)
- Born: 4 May 1953 Wakefield, England
- Height: 194 cm (6 ft 4 in)
- Weight: 70 kg (154 lb)

Sport
- Sport: Athletics
- Event: high jump
- Club: Cardiff AAC; RAF

Michael Butterfield (born 4 May 1953) is an English retired athlete who specialised in the high jump. He was the first British man to clear 7 feet (1975).

== Biography ==
Butterfield joined the Royal Air Force in 1970 aged just 16 and was a member of Cardiff AAC. He finished second behind Milton Palmer in the high jump event at the 1976 AAA Championships.

Butterfield, a corporal in the RAF at the time, became the first man to jump over 7ft at the Cosford Indoor Arena on 15 March 1975 and became the first ever winner of the high jump at the inaugural 1977 UK Athletics Championships.

Indoors, he became national champion in 1976, with a new national record of 2.16. He also finished runner-up three times; in 1974 behind Irish James Fanning, and 1977 and 1978, both behind Mark Naylor.
