= Ann-Marie Cording =

English high jumper

Ann-Marie Cording née Devally
Personal information
- Nationality: British (English)
- Born: 13 October 1959 (age 66)

Sport
- Sport: Athletics
- Event: high jump
- Club: Bedford AC

Ann-Marie Theresa Cording, née Devally (born 1959), is a female former athlete who competed for England.

== Biography ==
Devally finished second behind Barbara Simmonds in the high jump event at the 1979 WAAA Championships before becoming the British high jump champion after winning the British WAAA Championships title at the 1980 WAAA Championships and the 1981 WAAA Championships.

In between the two WAAA titles Devally married Ian Cording in Bedford during late 1980 and competed under her married name thereafter.

Cording represented England in the high jump event, at the 1982 Commonwealth Games in Brisbane, Australia.
