= Frederick Ashford =

English athlete (1886–1965)

Personal information
- Nationality: British (English)
- Born: 28 September 1886 Highbury, England
- Died: 29 September 1965 (aged 79) Scarborough, England

Sport
- Sport: Athletics
- Events: 800m, 880y
- Club: Finchley Harriers

Frederick Murray Ashford (28 September 1886 – 29 September 1965) was an English athlete from Islington, London, who competed in the 1908 Summer Olympics in London.

== Biography ==
Before the Olympics, Ashford had been a finalist in the 880 yards, representing the Finchley Harriers at the 1908 AAA Championships.

Ashford represented Great Britain at the 1908 Summer Olympics in London, in the 800 metres at the 1908 Summer Olympics, but he did not finish his semifinal heat, so did not advance to the final.

He later studied piano and organ at the Royal Academy of Music, developing into a tenor. He used his singing skills to form a Concert Party which played the season at Scarborough every year from 1929 to 1939.

== Sources ==
- Cook, Theodore Andrea (1908). The Fourth Olympiad, Being the Official Report. London: British Olympic Association.
- De Wael, Herman (2001). "Athletics 1908". Herman's Full Olympians. Archived from the original on 27 September 2006.
- Wudarski, Pawel (1999). "Wyniki Igrzysk Olimpijskich" (in Polish). Archived from the original on 16 February 2009.
