= Sue Mapstone =

British pentathlete

Personal information
- Nationality: British (English)
- Born: 16 December 1956 (age 69) Islington, London

Sport
- Sport: Athletics
- Event: Pentathlon
- Club: Harlow AC
Medal record
Athletics
Representing England
Commonwealth Games
Silver medal – second place	1978 Edmonton	pentathlon

Susan Lesley Mapstone (born 16 December 1956) is a former athlete who competed for England.

== Biography ==
Mapstone represented England in the pentathlon event, at the 1974 British Commonwealth Games in Christchurch, New Zealand.

Mapstone finished second behind Sue Longden in the pentathlon event at the 1976 WAAA Championships and second behind Yvette Wray at the 1978 WAAA Championships.

Mapstone represented England and won a silver medal in the same event at the 1978 Commonwealth Games in Edmonton, Alberta, Canada.
