= Frank Salvat =

British athlete (1934–2013)

Personal information
- Nationality: British (English)
- Born: 30 October 1934 Edgware, England
- Died: 24 April 2013 (aged 78) Brighton, England
- Height: 171 cm (5 ft 7 in)
- Weight: 59 kg (130 lb)

Sport
- Sport: Athletics
- Event: middle/long distance
- Club: Finchley Harriers

Frank George John Salvat (30 October 1934 – 24 April 2013) was a British athlete who represented Great Britain in the 5,000m the 1960 Summer Olympics in Rome, finishing seventh in his heats.

== Biography ==
Salvat was born in Edgware and was a magazine designer in London.

Salvat became the British 3 miles champion after winning the British AAA Championships title at the 1960 AAA Championships. He competed in international events, running for Great Britain against France in the 5,000m at White City and in the Olympics later that year. He was a member of Finchley Harriers, now Hillingdon Athletic Club, in northwest London.

Athletics agent Eric Shirley Jr, whose father Eric Shirley was Salvat's training partner, said: "He was an amazing man with an amazing amount of charisma. His pre-race diet, two hours before he competed, even at the very highest international level, would be a pie and a pint. It's not unknown for him to start a race with a brandy glass in his hand, hand it over to someone, and even have a cigar waiting for him at the end."

Salvat died in poverty in Hurstpierpoint, West Sussex on 24 April 2013. Nobody claimed his body after his death and he would have had a pauper's funeral, but pubs and businesses in Hurstpierpoint, as well as his former athletics club, raised money for a funeral and a wake.
