= Dean Bauck =

Canadian high jumper (born 1954)

Personal information
- Born: Dean Bauck; 15 May 1954 (age 72)

Sport
- Country: Canada
- Sport: Athletics
- Event: High jump
Medal record
Commonwealth Games
Bronze medal – third place	1978 Edmonton	High jump

Dean Bauck (born 16 May 1954) is a Canadian former athlete who specialised in high jump. He twice qualified for the Summer Olympics, but missed out on competing both times, due to a knee injury in 1976 and the boycott in 1980.

An athlete from Delta, British Columbia, Bauck was a bronze medalist for Canada in high jump at the 1978 Commonwealth Games. His jump of 2.15m gave him a joint third-place finish with Scotland's Brian Burgess and he was one of three Canadians on the podium, with Claude Ferragne and Greg Joy getting gold and silver respectively.

Bauck had a fifth-placed finish at the 1979 Pan American Games.

In 1981 he earned a gold medal at the Pacific Conference Games in Christchurch after a personal best 2.21m jump.
