= Urszula Kielan =

Polish high jumper

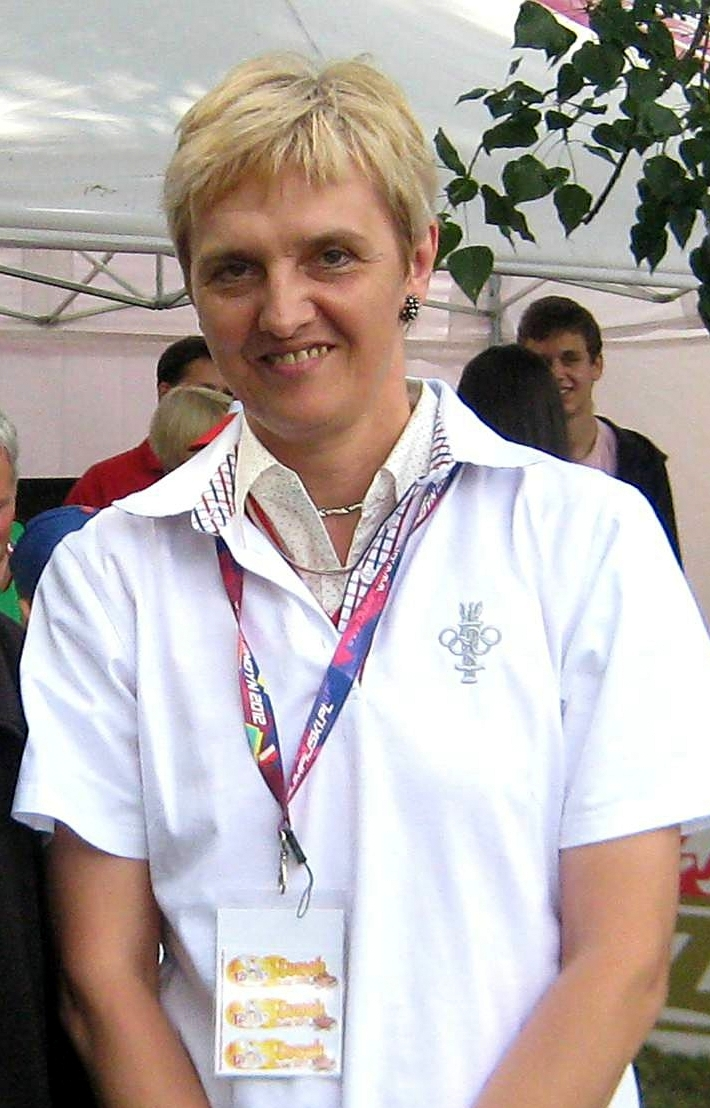
- Kielan in 2011

Personal information
- Nationality: Polish
- Born: 10 October 1960 (age 65) Otwock, Mazowieckie, Poland
- Height: 1.76 m (5 ft 9 in)
- Weight: 57 kg (126 lb)

Sport
- Sport: Athletics
- Event: High jump
Medal record
Women's athletics
Representing Poland
Olympic Games
| Silver medal – second place | 1980 Moscow | High Jump |
European Indoor Championships
| Silver medal – second place | 1979 Vienna | High Jump |
| Bronze medal – third place | 1978 Milan | High Jump |
| Bronze medal – third place | 1980 Sindelfingen | High Jump |
| Bronze medal – third place | 1981 Grenoble | High Jump |

Urszula Kielan–Lipiec, née Urszula Kielan, (10 October 1960 in Otwock) is a retired high jumper from Poland. She won four medals at the European Indoor Championships as well as an Olympic silver medal in 1980.

== Competition record ==
| Year | Competition | Venue | Position | Notes |
Representing Poland
| 1978 | European Indoor Championships | Milan, Italy | 3rd | 1.88 m |
| 1979 | European Indoor Championships | Vienna, Austria | 2nd | 1.85 m |
| 1980 | European Indoor Championships | Sindelfingen, West Germany | 3rd | 1.93 m |
| 1980 | Olympic Games | Moscow, Soviet Union | 2nd | 1.94 m |
| 1981 | European Indoor Championships | Grenoble, France | 3rd | 1.94 m |
| 1986 | European Indoor Championships | Madrid, Spain | 9th | 1.85 m |
| 1987 | World Indoor Championships | Indianapolis, United States | 11th | 1.85 m |
