= Michael Dudley =

British judge

Michael John Dudley (born 24 January 1947) is a retired British judge.

== Early life ==
Michael Dudley was born in Bristol and educated at Magdalen College School, Brackley. He studied law at Birmingham University and graduated with an LLB degree in 1968. After graduating, he lectured in law at Wednesbury College of Commerce and Technology (now Wolverhampton University) for four years. He was called to the Bar by Lincoln's Inn in 1972.

== Judicial career ==
Dudley's first judicial position was as a Deputy Stipendiary Magistrate in 1985. He was appointed an Assistant Recorder in 1993 and a Recorder in 1999, before being appointed a Circuit Judge in 2003. He sat at Wolverhampton Crown Court for the last seven years of his judicial career.

In his retirement speech at Wolverhampton Crown Court, Dudley voiced his concerns for the future of the legal system due to government's austerity cuts. Dudley told his audience that:

There are so many changes and they are all put at the door of the economic situation. I am concerned that the Criminal Bar is not remunerated properly and speedily. It needs support because we must not lose the Criminal Bar and there is a serious risk of that happening. If we lose the Bar we lose the protection of the law. If people are not defended properly the prosecution can get sloppy. My biggest regret is that we have stopped catering for jurors. It is an insult to them. We want them to get involved in the judicial process. They have an important job to do but we are not able to feed them. That is unfortunate. We now have to send them away for food and if a jury is in retirement, considering their verdict, we lose one and a half hours. That means we lose the equivalent of a day if they are out for four days. Wolverhampton is such a small place that there is a huge danger of jurors bumping into witnesses or even defendants while using the same facilities as them. I would love to see that redressed.

Dudley retired as a Circuit Judge in January 2015.
