= Jane Haist =

Canadian shot putter and discus thrower (1949–2022)

Personal information
- Born: March 1, 1949 St. Catharines, Ontario, Canada
- Died: May 21, 2022 (aged 73) Fort Erie, Ontario, Canada
- Height: 175 cm (5 ft 9 in)
- Weight: 84 kg (185 lb)

Sport
- Sport: Athletics
- Event: shot put/discus throw
- Club: Thornhill
Medal record
Women's Athletics
Representing Canada
Commonwealth Games
Gold medal – first place	1974 Christchurch	Discus Throw
Gold medal – first place	1974 Christchurch	Shot Put
Pan American Games
Bronze medal – third place	1975 Mexico City	Discus Throw

Jane Haist (March 1, 1949 – May 21, 2022) was a Canadian discus thrower and shot putter, who competed at the 1976 Summer Olympics.

== Biography ==
Haist is best known for winning two gold medals for Canada at the 1974 Commonwealth Games in the women's discus throw and in the women's shot put event. Later that year, Haist won the British WAAA Championships titles in the shot put and discus throw events at the 1974 WAAA Championships.

She was national U.S. collegiate champion in the discus representing the University of Tennessee in 1977.

She died on May 21, 2022, of cancer.
