= Athletics at the 1990 Commonwealth Games – Women's high jump =

Women's high jump at the Commonwealth Games

The women's high jump event at the 1990 Commonwealth Games was held on 1 February at the Mount Smart Stadium in Auckland.

== Results ==
Rank	Name	Nationality	1.65	1.70	1.75	1.80	1.85	1.88	1.91	1.91	1.88	1.91	1.88	1.85	Result	Notes
1st place, gold medalist(s)	Tania Murray	New Zealand	–	–	o	o	o	o	xxx	x	o	x	x	o	1.88	
2nd place, silver medalist(s)	Janet Boyle	Northern Ireland	–	–	o	o	o	o	xxx	x	o	x	x	x	1.88	
3rd place, bronze medalist(s)	Tracy Phillips	New Zealand													1.88	
4	Trudy Woodhead	New Zealand	–	–	o	o	xo	xo	xxx						1.88	
4	Vanessa Ward	Australia	–	–	–	o	xo	xo	xxx						1.88	
6	Jenny Talbot	Australia	–	–	o	o	o	xxo	xxx						1.88	=PB
7	Deann Bopf	Australia	–	–	o	o	o	xxx							1.85	
8	Leslie Estwick	Canada	–	–	o	xo	xxo	xxx							1.85	
9	Diana Davies	England	–	–	o	o	xxx								1.80	
9	Jeannie Cockcroft	Canada	–	–	o	o	xxx								1.80	
11	Nkechi Madubuko	Nigeria													1.80	
11	Linda McCurdy-Cameron	Canada	–	–	o	xo	xxx								1.80	
13	Sharon Hutchings	Northern Ireland	–	o	o	xxo	xxx								1.80	
14	Michele Wheeler	England	–	o	o	xxx									1.75	
15	Jo Jennings	England	o	xxo	xxx										1.70	
	Dionne Gardner	Norfolk Island													NM	
	Shona Urquhart	Scotland													DNS	
