= Mike Colin Campbell =

English athlete (born 1943)

Mike Campbell
Personal information
- Nationality: British (English)
- Born: 15 May 1943 (age 83) London, England

Sport
- Sport: Athletics
- Event: High jump
- Club: Hillingdon AC

Michael Colin Campbell (born 15 May 1943) is a male former athlete who competed for England.

== Biography ==
Campbell was educated at University of Leicester and was a member of the Hillingdon AC and was a six times South of England champion.

Campbell finished fourth at the 1968 AAA Championships but by virtue of being the highest placed British athlete in the high jump event was considered the British high jump champion. He then finished third behind Kenneth Lundmark at the 1969 AAA Championships before winning the title outright at the 1971 AAA Championships with a jump of 2.04m.

He was selected for England and he represented England in the high jump, at the 1970 British Commonwealth Games in Edinburgh, Scotland.

After athletics, Campbell was a lecturer in Photographic Technology at the Kodak International Photographic School in Harrow and taught photography and documentary film production at the Salisbury College of Art from 1971 -1978. Later he emigrated to the United States.
