= Petra Wziontek =

German high jumper (born 1960)

Petra Wziontek (born 30 August 1960) is a retired West German high jumper.

She finished fifth at the 1980 European Indoor Championships. She represented the sports club ASV Köln, and won the silver medal at the West German championships in 1982.

Her personal best jump was 1.91 metres, achieved in June 1979 in Bremen.
