= Charmaine Weavers =

South African high jumper

Charmaine Gale-Weavers
Personal information
- Born: 27 February 1964 (age 62) Estcourt, South Africa
- Height: 1.78 m (5 ft 10 in)
- Weight: 65 kg (143 lb)

Sport
- Sport: Athletics
- Event: High jump
Medal record
Women's athletics
Representing South Africa
African Championships
Gold medal – first place	1993 Durban	High jump
Silver medal – second place	1992 Belle Vue Harel	High jump

Charmaine Gale-Weavers (born 27 February 1964) is a South African retired athlete who specialised in the high jump. She represented her country at the 1992 Summer Olympics and 1993 World Championships. In addition, she finished second at the 1994 Commonwealth Games and 1994 World Cup. Because of the boycott of the apartheid era South Africa she was only allowed to compete internationally in 1992.

Her personal best in the event is 2.00 metres set in Pretoria in 1985.

Competing for the Arizona Wildcats track and field team, Weavers won the high jump at the 1982 AIAW Indoor Track and Field Championships.

== Competition record ==
Year	Competition	Venue	Position	Notes
Representing South Africa
1992	African Championships	Belle Vue Maurel, Mauritius	2nd	1.92 m
1992	Olympic Games	Barcelona, Spain	39th (q)	1.75 m
1993	African Championships	Durban, South Africa	1st	1.90 m
1993	World Championships	Stuttgart, Germany	30th (q)	1.80 m
1994	Commonwealth Games	Victoria, Canada	2nd	1.94 m
1994	World Cup	London, United Kingdom	2nd	1.91 m
