= Denise Brown (athlete) =

British high jumper

Personal information
- Nationality: British (English)
- Born: 1 May 1955 (age 71) Beckenham, Greater London, England
- Height: 175 cm (5 ft 9 in)
- Weight: 64 kg (141 lb)

Sport
- Sport: Athletics
- Event: High jump
- Club: Wolverhampton & Bilston AC

Denise Brown (born 1 May 1955) is a British retired athlete who competed at the 1976 Summer Olympics.

== Biography ==
Brown became the British high jump champion after winning the British WAAA Championships title at the 1975 WAAA Championships and retained the title at the 1976 WAAA Championships.

At the 1976 Olympics Games in Montreal, she represented Great Britain in the women's high jump competition.
