= William Land (athlete) =

British track and field athlete

Personal information
- Nationality: British (English)
- Born: 1914
- Died: 2006 (aged 91–92)

Sport
- Sport: Athletics
- Event: high jump/discus/javelin
- Club: Army A & CAA

William Anthony Land (1914 – 2006) was an English track and field athlete who competed at the 1934 British Empire Games and was a British champion at high jump.

== Biography ==
In 1929, Land joined the Royal Engineers as a Bugler. Land became the national high jump champion after winning the British AAA Championships title at the 1932 AAA Championships.

Land represented England at the 1934 British Empire Games, where he finished equal sixth in the high jump competition.

He also competed in the discus throw and held the British javelin throw record in 1935.

During World War II, Land served with the Royal Engineers, reaching the rank of Captain. As one of the 'Desert Rats' he fought in the Battle of El Alamein. He was later awarded the Military Cross in 1945 after organising the evacuation of dead and wounded soldiers whilst under fire.

Land died in 2006.
