= Brian Burgess (athlete) =

British high jumper (born 1957)

Personal information
- Nationality: British (Scottish)
- Born: 30 September 1957 (age 68)

Sport
- Sport: Athletics
- Event: High jump
- Club: Edinburgh AC
Medal record
Representing Scotland
Commonwealth Games
Bronze medal – third place	1978 Edmonton	High jump

Brian Burgess (born 30 September 1957) is a Scottish former athlete who specialised in the high jump. His personal best jump of 2.20m, set in London on 11 June 1978, set a British national record.

== Biography ==
Burgess finished third behind two Americans in the high jump event at the 1978 AAA Championships by virtue of being the highest placed British athlete was considered the British high jump champion. Shortly afterwards Burgess won a bronze medal for Scotland at the 1978 Commonwealth Games, with a best jump of 2.15m in the final, to share third place with Canada's Dean Bauck. He was the only non-Canadian on the podium and the first Scot to win a high jump medal since Alan Paterson in 1950.

A six-time Scottish champion, he was also a two-time champion at the UK Athletics Championships, in 1979 and 1981.
