= Susan Longden =

British pentathlete

Susan Longden née Wright
Personal information
- Nationality: British (English)
- Born: 22 January 1950 (age 75) Epping, England
- Height: 180 cm (5 ft 11 in)
- Weight: 70 kg (154 lb)

Sport
- Sport: Athletics
- Event: Pentathlon
- Club: Essex Ladies AC

Susan Jane Longden née Wright (born 22 January 1950) is a retired British athlete who competed at two Olympic Games.

== Biography ==
Wright finished third behind Ann Wilson in the pentathlon event at the 1974 WAAA Championships before becoming the British pentathlon champion after winning the British WAAA Championships title at the 1975 WAAA Championships.

Shortly after her 1975 WAAA title win, Wright married Bruce Longden and competed under her married name thereafter.

At the 1976 Olympic Games in Montreal, Longden represented Great Britain in the pentathlon and then retained her WAAA pentathlon title at the 1976 WAAA Championships.

Londen won her third title with a national record haul of 4152 points at the 1977 WAAA Championships and clinched a fourth at the 1980 WAAA Championships.

At the 1980 Olympics Games in Moscow, Longden represented Great Britain in the women's pentathlon again.
