= Janet Boyle =

British high jumper (born 1963)

Personal information
- Nationality: Northern Irish
- Born: 25 July 1963 (age 63) Belfast, Northern Ireland
- Height: 178 cm (5 ft 10 in)
- Weight: 58 kg (128 lb)

Sport
- Sport: Athletics
- Event: High jump
- Club: Belfast Ladies
Medal record
Representing Northern Ireland
Women's Athletics
Commonwealth Games
Silver medal – second place	1990 Auckland	High jump
Bronze medal – third place	1986 Edinburgh	High jump

Janet Margaret Boyle (born 25 July 1963) is a former high jumper from Northern Ireland. She represented Great Britain & Northern Ireland at the 1988 Olympic Games in Seoul. At the Commonwealth Games, she won a bronze medal in Edinburgh 1986 and a silver medal in Auckland 1990.

== Biography ==
Boyle was born in Belfast, Northern Ireland and first came to prominence in 1983, finishing second at the UK Championships with 1.80 metres and third behind Gillian Evans at the 1983 WAAA Championships with a jump of 1.85 m.

Boyle won her first UK title in 1985 with a clearance of 1.86m. In 1986, she earned selection for both the Commonwealth Games and the European Championships. At the Commonwealth Games in Edinburgh, representing Northern Ireland in a high quality competition, she won the bronze medal with a personal best of 1.90m. Northern Ireland won two medals, as her teammate Sharon McPeake won the silver medal, also clearing 1.90m. At the Europeans in Stuttgart, she was eliminated in the qualifying round with a best of 1.83m. She ended the season by improving her PB at a meeting at the Crystal Palace in September, clearing 1.91m.

In 1987, Boyle won the AAAs indoor title with a jump of 1.90m and went on to finish sixth at the European Indoor Championships in Lievin, with 1.91m. This would remain her best ever indoor clearance. Outdoors, she placed second to Diana Davies at the UK Championships. No female high jumper from the UK was selected for that years World Championships in Rome.

Boyle reached her peak in 1988. She won at the 1988 AAA Championships, also incorporating the UK Olympic trials, equalling her PB of 1.91m. Then at the Seoul Olympics she achieved her lifetime best with 1.92m in the qualifying round, to reach the Olympic final. In the final, she cleared 1.90m to finish 12th. Diana Davies also reached the final, finishing equal eighth, making 1988 the last time (as of 2014) that two women from the UK reached the Olympic high jump final.

Boyle continued as one of the UK's leading jumpers for the next four years. In 1989, she won her second UK title with a 1.83m clearance. In 1990, at her second Commonwealth Games in Auckland, she won the silver medal with 1.88m, losing the gold medal in a jump off with New Zealand's Tania Murray. In 1991, she was third at the UK Championships and second at the AAAs Championships, behind Debbie Marti. She competed at the 1992 AAAs Championships, which were also the Olympic trials, but failed to earn selection for the Barcelona Olympics.

As of 2015, Boyle's best of 1.92m from Seoul in 1988, ranks her 11th on the UK all-time list and remains the Northern Irish record.

== Achievements ==
- AAAs National Champion (1988)
- UK National Champion (1985, 1989)
- AAAs National Indoor Champion (1987)
- Northern Irish Champion (1985, 1988)

Year	Competition	Venue	Position	Notes
Representing Great Britain / Northern Ireland
1986	Commonwealth Games	Edinburgh, United Kingdom	3rd	1.90 m
1986	European Championships	Stuttgart, West Germany	19th (q)	1.83 m
1987	European Indoor Championships	Lievin, France	6th	1.91 m
1987	European Cup	Prague, Czechoslovakia	7th	1.85 m
1988	Olympic Games	Seoul, South Korea	12th	1.90 m (1.92)
1990	Commonwealth Games	Auckland, New Zealand	2nd	1.88 m

Notes:

- Result with (q) indicate overall position in qualifying round.
- Height in (#) indicates height achieved in qualifying round
