= Tracy Phillips =

New Zealand high jumper and police officer (born 1968)

Tracy Phillips MNZM
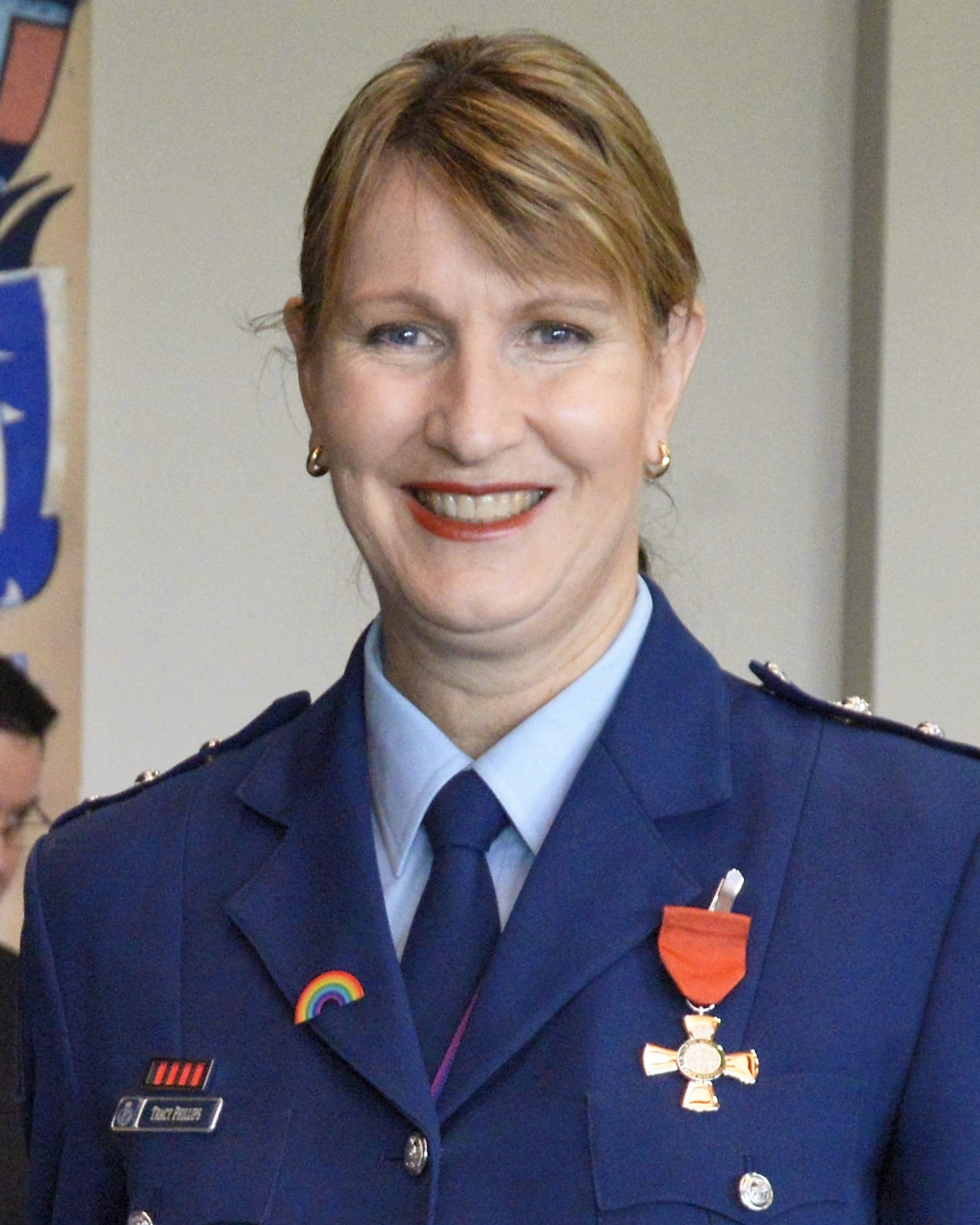
- Phillips in 2018

Personal information
- Full name: Tracy Joy Phillips
- Born: 8 January 1968 (age 58) Lincoln, New Zealand
- Occupations: Police officer; animal welfare inspector; marine accident investigator

Sport
- Country: New Zealand
- Sport: Track and field
- Event: High jump

Achievements and titles
- National finals: High jump champion (1993, 1994, 1996)
Medal record
Women's athletics
Representing New Zealand
Commonwealth Games
Bronze medal – third place	1990 Auckland	High jump

Tracy Joy Phillips MNZM (born 8 January 1968) is a former New Zealand high jumper and police officer. She competed for New Zealand at two Commonwealth Games, in 1990 and 1994, winning a bronze medal in the high jump in 1990. Phillips joined the New Zealand Police in 1990, rising to the rank of inspector. She is noted for her advocacy for LGBTIQ+-friendly policies within the police, and for her support of the relationship between the New Zealand Police and the LGBTIQ+ community. Since leaving the New Zealand Police in 2019, Phillips has worked as the inspectorate general manager for the Royal New Zealand Society for the Prevention of Cruelty to Animals, and since 2020 she has been a principal investigator at Maritime New Zealand.

== Early life and family ==
Phillips was born at Lincoln on 8 January 1968, the daughter of Yvonne (née Wright) and Fred Phillips. She was raised in Whanganui, and was educated at Wanganui High School. Phillips went on to study at the University of Canterbury, graduating with a Bachelor of Arts degree in 1989.

== Honours and awards ==
Phillips was awarded the New Zealand 1990 Commemoration Medal. In the 2018 Queen's Birthday Honours, she was appointed a Member of the New Zealand Order of Merit, for services to the New Zealand Police and the community.
