= Sharon McPeake =

Northern Irish athlete (born 1962)

Sharon Hutchings née McPeake
Personal information
- Nationality: Northern Irish
- Born: 22 June 1962 (age 64) Northern Ireland

Sport
- Sport: Athletics
- Event: high jump
- Club: Ballymena and Antrim AC
Medal record
Representing Northern Ireland
Women's Athletics
Commonwealth Games
Silver medal – second place	1986 Edinburgh	High jump

Sharon Hutchings (née McPeake, born 22 June 1962) is a former high jumper from Northern Ireland. She won a silver medal at the 1986 Commonwealth Games in Edinburgh with a lifetime best of 1.90 m (6 ft 2 3/4 in).

== Biography ==
McPeake was born in Ballymena, Northern Ireland and was a member of Ballymena and Antrim Athletics Club. As a 17-year-old in 1979, she finished third at the AAA Championships with 1.73 metres. In 1981, she finished third at the UK National Championships with a clearance of 1.83m. In 1982, McPeake competed at her first Commonwealth Games in Brisbane, finishing ninth with 1.74m. In 1985, she finished second at the UK Championships, behind fellow Northern Irish athlete Janet Boyle.

The best season of McPeake's career came in 1986. She finished second behind Diana Davies at both the UK Championships and AAAs Championships with 1.80m. Then at the Commonwealth Games in Edinburgh, representing Northern Ireland, she achieved her lifetime best of 1.90m to win the silver medal, defeating teammate Janet Boyle and England's Diana Davies on countback. The competition, which was won by Australia's Christine Stanton with 1.92m, remains one of the highest quality Commonwealth high jump competitions in history, with nine jumpers clearing 1.83 m or better. She also competed at the European Championships in Stuttgart, where she was eliminated in the qualifying round. She participated in Prince Edward's 1987 charity television special The Grand Knockout Tournament. Later in 1987, she again finished second at the 1987 WAAA Championships with 1.85m. Her season's best for the year was 1.89m.

In 1988, now competing as Sharon Hutchings, she narrowly missed Olympic selection for Seoul. At the AAAs Championships incorporating the Olympic trials, with the top two guaranteed selection, she was third, losing second place on countback. The competition was won by Janet Boyle with 1.91m, while both Hutchings and 19-year-old Jo Jennings cleared the Olympic qualifying standard of 1.88m. The third Olympic spot went to that years UK number one Diana Davies, who had cleared 1.9 m a month before the trials.

In 1989, she won the AAAs Indoor Championships title with 1.82m, to defeat Debbie Marti on countback. She earned selection for the 1990 Commonwealth Games in Auckland in January, where she finished 13th with 1.80m. Auckland would prove to be the conclusion of her international career. Her best of 1.90m from 1986 ranks her (as of 2017) 20th on the UK all-time list and second behind Janet Boyle on the Northern Irish all-time list.

== Personal life ==
McPeake married fellow international athlete Tim Hutchings in 1987. Among his achievements is a fourth-place finish in the 5000 metres final at the 1984 Los Angeles Olympics, and winning silver medals at the World Cross Country Championships in 1984 and 1989. They have two children, Laura and Jamie.

== Achievements ==
- AAAs National Indoor Champion (1989)
- 2nd at the AAAs National Championships (1986, 1987)
- 2nd at the UK National Championships (1985, 1986)
- 6 Times Northern Irish Champion (1978, 1979, 1981, 1982, 1986, 1989)

Year	Competition	Venue	Position	Notes
Representing Great Britain / Northern Ireland
1982	Commonwealth Games	Brisbane, Australia	9th	1.74 m
1986	Commonwealth Games	Edinburgh, Scotland	2nd	1.90 m
1986	European Championships	Stuttgart, West Germany	22nd (q)	1.76 m
1990	Commonwealth Games	Auckland, New Zealand	13th	1.80 m
