= Mark Naylor =

English high jumper (born 1957)

Personal information
- Nationality: British (English)
- Born: 10 September 1957 (age 68) York, England
- Height: 186 cm (6 ft 1 in)
- Weight: 78 kg (172 lb)

Sport
- Sport: Athletics
- Event: High jump
- Club: Hillingdon AC

Mark Naylor (born 10 September 1957) is a retired male high jumper from England. he competed at the 1980 Summer Olympics and the 1984 Summer Olympics.

== Biography ==
Naylor was a member of Hillingdon Athletic Club during his career and finished second behind Alan Dainton in the high jump event at the 1977 AAA Championships. He represented England in the high jump event, at the 1978 Commonwealth Games in Edmonton, Alberta, Canada.

At the 1980 Olympics Games in Moscow, he represented Great Britain and shortly afterwards finished second behind Carlo Thränhardt at the 1980 AAA Championships but by virtue of being the highest placed British athlete was considered the British high jump champion. Naylor set his personal best (2.24 metres) in 1980.

Naylor was British champion again in 1981 after another second place behind a non-British athlete in James Frazier of the United States. He attended his second Olympic Games at the 1984 Olympic Games in Los Angeles, representing Great Britain in the high jump event.

Additionally, Naylor was a two-time UK Athletics Championships in 1978 and 1980.
