= Karin Wagner =

German high jumper

Personal information
- Born: 26 August 1952 (age 74) Mainz, West Germany

Sport
- Sport: Track and field
Medal record
Representing Germany
German Championships
Gold medal – first place	1974	High Jump

Karin Geese (née Wagner; born 26 August 1952) is a German high jumper, who was successful in the 1970s.

== Biography ==
Karin Geese first competed for TV St. Ingbert 1881 e.V. and later for USC Mainz in Mainz. She won her sole German outdoor championship in 1974 when she beat Ulrike Meyfarth clearing 1.85 meters. She led the German rankings in 1974 with a best of 1.86 meters. At the German Indoor Championships she finished second thrice, 1971,1972 and 1974.
