= Marie-Christine Debourse =

French athletics competitor

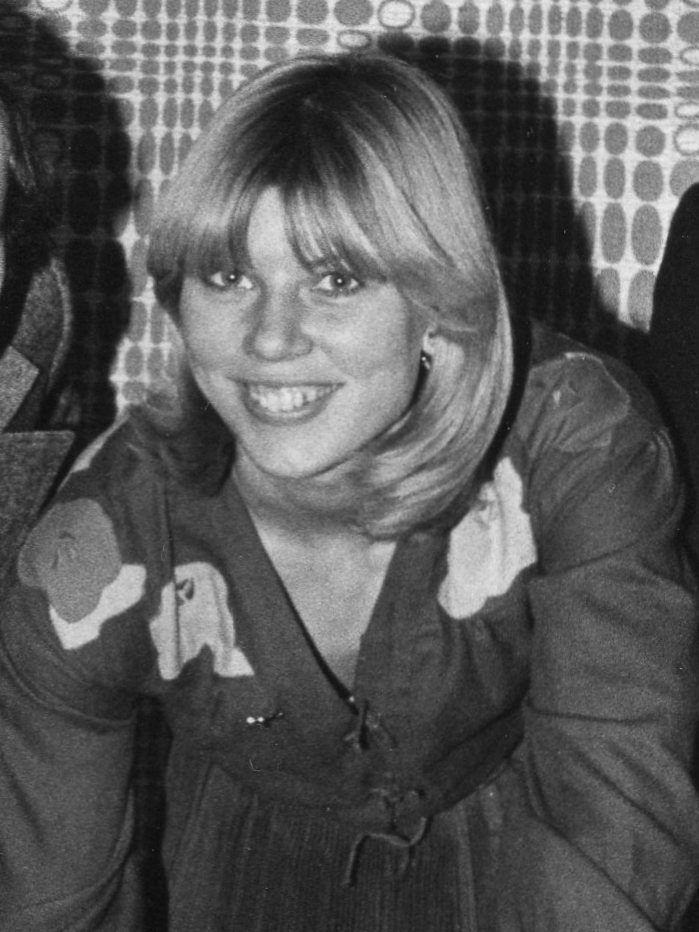
- Marie-Christine Debourse at the start of the French Football Cup

Personal information
- Born: 24 September 1951 (age 74) Wambrechies
- Years active: 1967-1977

Sport
- Events: High Jump, Pentathlon
Medal record
Women's athletics
Representing France
European Indoor Championships
Silver medal – second place	1975 Katowice	High jump

Marie-Christine Debourse, born 24 September 1951 at Wambrechies is a former French athlete who specialized in the high jump and pentathlon. Her athletic club was ASPTT from Lille from 1967 to 1974, the Union sportive métropolitaine des transports de Paris (USMT Paris) from 1975 to 1976, and Stade français from 1977 to 1980.

Since the beginning of 1978, she was part of TF1's Sports Service run by Georges de Caunes and she participated in the TV show Sports Première. She also made an appearance on the show La Tête et les Jambes.

She now works in the hospitality/Public Relations department of Sportfive.

== Prize list ==
- (gold) French champion in the high jump: 1971, 1973, 1974, 1975, 1976 and 1977
- (gold) French champion in the pentathlon: 1969, 1972, 1973, 1975, 1976 and 1977
- (gold) French champion in the Indoors high jump in 1975 and 1976
- (silver) 2nd in 1975 European Indoor Championships in Katowice, Poland in March 1975, with a height of 1.83 m in the High Jump
- 36 caps for French National Athletic Teams from 1969 to 1977 (and 3 juniors)
- Participation in the 1972 Munich Olympic Games in the Pentathlon and the 1976 Montreal Olympic Games in the High Jump. She finished 17th in the Pentathlon in 1972 and 15th in the High Jump in 1976.

== Records ==
- 6 French records in the high jump (over 9 years: 1973 on 4 occasions, 1976 and 1977 with 1.88 m)
- 8 French records in the pentathlon (also 9 years)

== Bibliography ==
- Gym express, bonjour la forme, éd. Solar (1987)
- Guide de l'homme épanoui: 40 ans, éd. Vecteurs (1989)
- La femme d'aujourd'hui et le sport, éd. Amphora (1981)
