= Louise Hanna-Walker =

Canadian high jumper (born 1951)

Louise Walker née Hanna
Personal information
- Born: 21 March 1951 (age 75) Toronto, Canada

Sport
- Sport: Athletics
- Event: High jump
Medal record
Representing Canada
Commonwealth Games
Silver medal – second place	1974 Christchurch	High jump
Pan American Games
Silver medal – second place	1975 Mexico City	High jump

Louise Walker née Hanna (born 21 March 1951) is a Canadian former athlete. She competed in the women's high jump at the 1972 Summer Olympics and the 1976 Summer Olympics.

== Biography ==
Hanna won a silver medal at the 1974 Commonwealth Games in Christchurch, New Zealand and later that year in July 1974 Hanna finished third behind Val Harrison in the high jump event at the 1974 WAAA Championships.

Hanna won another silver medal at the Pan American Games in 1975.
