= Barbara Simmonds =

English high jumper

Personal information
- Nationality: British (English)
- Born: 6 October 1961 (age 64)

Sport
- Sport: Athletics
- Event: high jump
- Club: Oxford City AC
Medal record
Athletics
Representing England
Commonwealth Games
Bronze medal – third place	1982 Brisbane	high jump

Barbara Aileen Simmonds (born 10 June 1961), is a female former athlete who competed for England.

== Biography ==
Simmonds represented England in the high jump, at the 1978 Commonwealth Games in Edmonton, Canada. The following year, Simmonds became the British high jump champion after winning the British WAAA Championships title at the 1979 WAAA Championships.

Simmonds regained the WAAA high jump title at the 1982 WAAA Championships and shortly afterwards she represented England at the 1982 Commonwealth Games in Brisbane, Australia, winning a bronze medal in the high jump event.
