= Ann-Ewa Karlsson =

Swedish high jumper

Personal information
- National team: Sweden
- Born: 1 April 1955 (age 70) Flen, Södermanland, Sweden

Sport
- Sport: Athletics - High jump

Ann-Ewa Karlsson (born 1 April 1955) is a former Swedish female high jumper. She competed at the 1980 Summer Olympics representing Sweden.
