= Virginia Bonci =

Romanian high jumper (1949–2020)

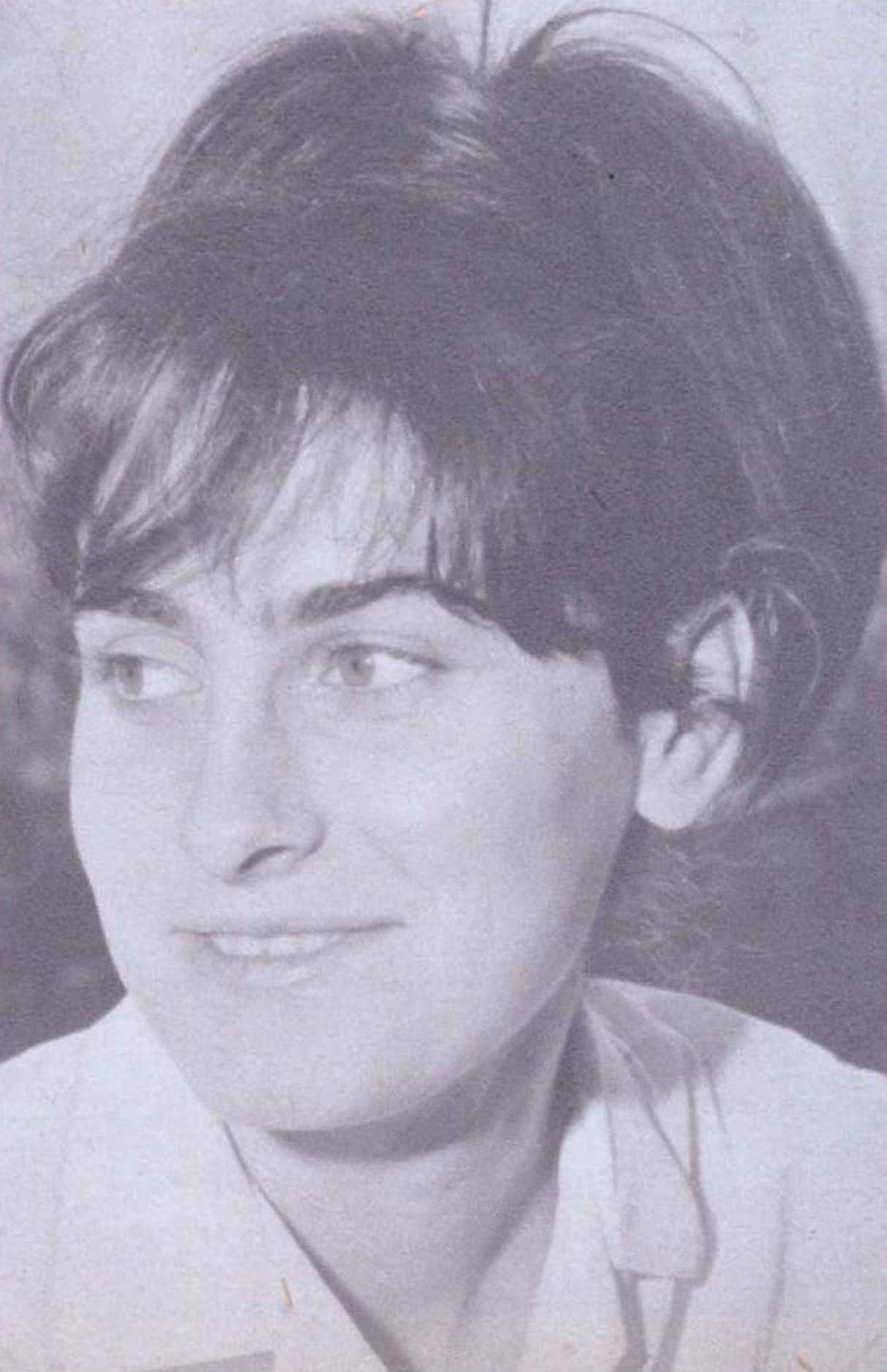

Personal information
- Nationality: Romanian
- Born: 5 January 1949 Pielești, Romania
- Died: 9 November 2020 (aged 71) Bucharest, Bucharest

Sport
- Sport: Athletics
- Event: High jump
- Club: Rapid București
Medal record
Representing Romania
Summer Universiade
Gold medal – first place	1973 Moscow	High jump
European Indoor Championships
Silver medal – second place	1968 Madrid	High jump

Virginia Bonci-Joan (5 January 1949 – 9 November 2020) was a Romanian track and field athlete who specialised in the high jump. She competed in the women's high jump at the 1968 Summer Olympics. She was a 5-time gold medalist in the Romanian Championships.
