= Sharon Corbett =

English javelin thrower

Sharon Corbett married name Avann
Personal information
- Nationality: British (English)
- Born: 24 June 1953 (age 73) Birmingham, England

Sport
- Sport: Athletics
- Event: javelin
- Club: Solihull and Small Heath AC
Medal record
Athletics
Representing England
Commonwealth Games
Bronze medal – third place	1974 Christchurch	javelin

Sharon Corbett (married name Sharon Avann) (born 24 June 1953), is a former athlete who competed for England.

== Biography ==
Corbett twice finished third in the javelin event at the WAAA Championships; behind Inger Fallo at the 1971 WAAA Championships and behind Pru French at the 1972 WAAA Championships. She finally became the British javelin champion at the 1973 WAAA Championships.

Corbett represented England and won a bronze medal in the javelin event, at the 1974 British Commonwealth Games in Christchurch, New Zealand.

Corbett finished behind Tessa Sanderson at the WAA Championships in both 1975 and 1976; the second of which she competed under her married name Avann. She had married John Avann in late 1975.
