= Galina Filatova =

Soviet high jumper

Personal information
- Nationality: Soviet
- Born: 18 December 1949 (age 76) Chelyabinsk Oblast, Soviet Union

Sport
- Sport: Athletics
- Event: High jump
Medal record
Representing Soviet Union
Summer Universiade
Gold medal – first place	1975 Rome	High jump
Bronze medal – third place	1973 Moscow	High jump

Galina Filatova (born 18 December 1949) is a Soviet athlete. She competed in the women's high jump at the 1976 Summer Olympics.
