= Val Rutter =

British high jumper

Val Rutter née Harrison
Personal information
- Nationality: British (English)
- Born: 30 October 1954 (age 71) Liverpool, England

Sport
- Sport: Athletics
- Club: Liverpool Harriers

Valerie Joy Rutter née Harrison (born 30 October 1954), is a female former athlete who competed for England.

== Biography ==
Harrison finished third behind Ilona Gusenbauer in the high jump event at the 1973 WAAA Championships before becoming British high jump champion after winning the British WAAA Championships title at the 1974 WAAA Championships.

In between the WAAA Championships, Harrison represented England in the high jump event, at the 1974 British Commonwealth Games in Christchurch, New Zealand.

Harrison married Raymond Rutter in the Summer of 1977 and competed under her married name thereafter.

Four years later, Rutter represented England again in the high jump event, at the 1978 Commonwealth Games in Edmonton, Alberta, Canada.
