= Armstrong High School (Virginia) =

High school in Virginia, US

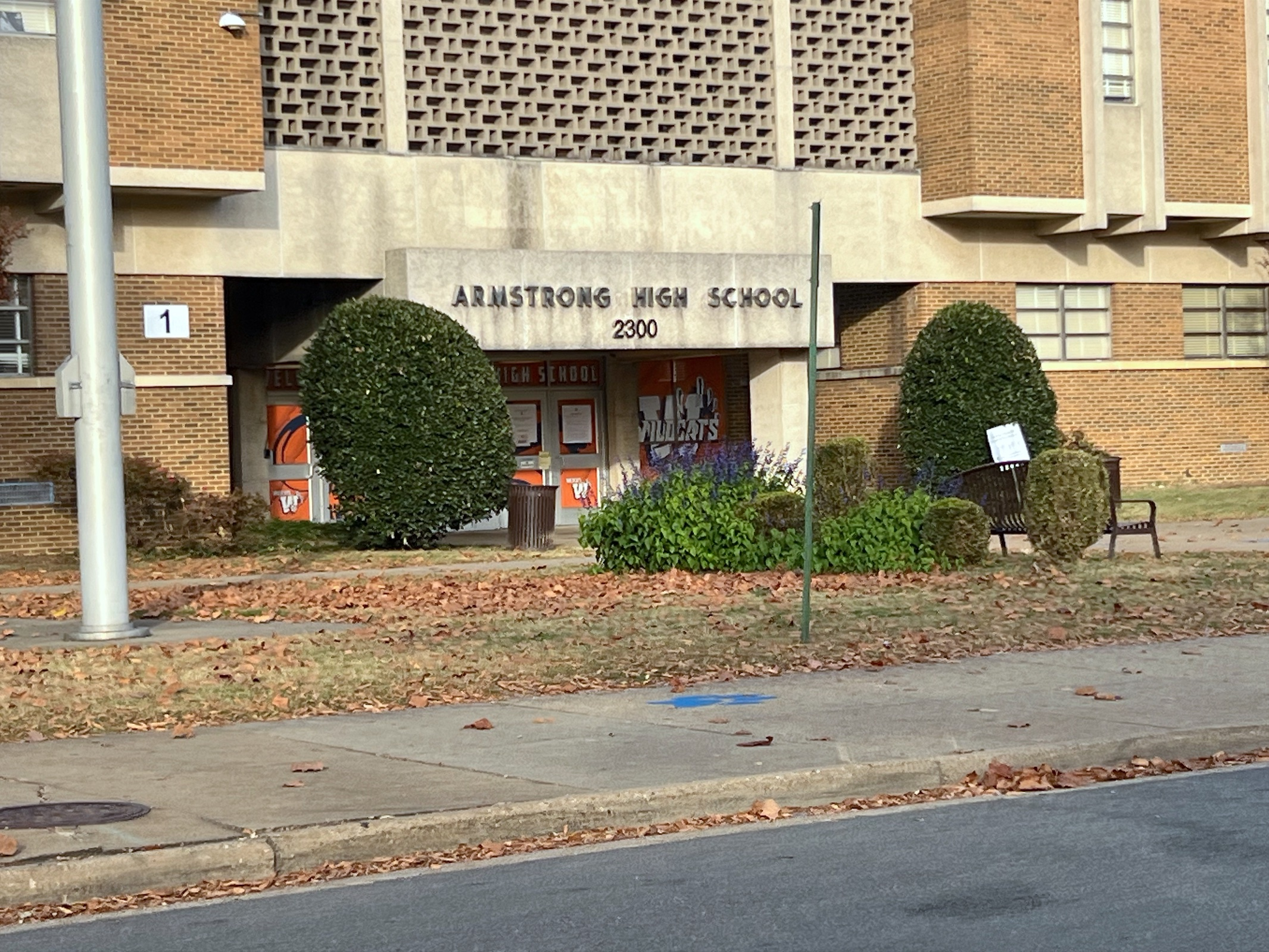

Location
- 2300 Cool Lane; Richmond, Virginia 23223; United States; 37°33′08″N 77°24′11″W

Information
- School type: Public high school
- Founded: 1867
- Locale: Suburban, Large
- School district: Richmond City Public Schools
- NCES District ID: 5103240
- Superintendent: Jason Kamras
- NCES School ID: 510324002082
- Principal: Principal Kelly M. Carter
- Teaching staff: 82.20 (on an FTE basis)
- Grades: 9–12
- Enrollment: 709 (2024–25)
- Student to teacher ratio: 8.63
- Language: English
- Campus: Urban
- Colors: Blue and Orange
- Athletics conference: Virginia High School League; Capital District
- Mascot: Wildcats
- Website: https://ahs.rvaschools.net

Armstrong High School, part of the Richmond Public Schools, is a high school located in Richmond, Virginia, United States, with grades 9–12. The school was founded in 1867 as the Richmond Normal and High School by the Freedmen's Bureau and was eventually incorporated into the Richmond school system in 1876. The school's namesake is former Union General Samuel Chapman Armstrong, a white commander of a U.S. Colored Troops (USCT) regiment during the American Civil War. General Armstrong later founded Hampton Institute, a historically black college now known as Hampton University in Hampton, Virginia. Armstrong was a mentor of Booker T. Washington.

== History ==
The Richmond Normal and High School was conceived by Ralza M. Manly and opened in October 1867. It initially drew funding from a variety of sources, including the Freedmen's Bureau, American Freedmen's Union Commission, and local African-Americans. The Richmond Educational Association took over the school's operation when the Freedmen's Bureau ceased operations in the state in 1870. By the following year it had been renamed Richmond Colored Normal School and moved buildings. The city of Richmond took over the school in 1876. Around the 1880s the school was renamed the Richmond Colored High and Normal School and in 1909 it adopted its current name of Armstrong High School.

In 1883, the high school held its first integrated graduation after black seniors protested at having a separate graduation ceremony from white students at other Richmond schools. The students succeeded in moving their graduation from the church where it was planned to the school's auditorium, although seating was still segregated by race. Students Mary Burrell, Wendell Dabney and Maggie L. Walker were part of the graduating class, and Dabney later claimed that this was "the first school strike of Negroes in America."

The location of Armstrong High school has changed three times since 1909. Once in 1923, then in 1951, and then again in 2004. It is now in its fourth location.

In 1909, the school was established at Leigh Streets at first and named in honor of Union General Samuel Chapman Armstrong, founder of Hampton University. The school then moved to a larger facility in 1923 at the corner of Prentis and Leigh Streets (now the Adult Career Development Center), and then to a new location, 1611 North 31st Street, in 1951.

In 2004, Armstrong High School merged with the nearby John F. Kennedy High School, continuing to use the Armstrong name, colors and mascot, except that it was now much newer and revamped with its air conditioned Kennedy building.

At the current location, Armstrong High School is one of only two of Richmond's public schools which are physically located slightly outside the corporate limits of the independent city in the East End. The Kennedy High School complex and Fairfield Court Elementary School were built in the 1960s on land in a small portion of Henrico County adjacent to Interstate 64 which was cut off from the rest of the county when the Interstate highway was built.

The school's public address announcer and former faculty member, Rodney Robinson, was named the 2019 National Teacher of the Year.

== Neighborhoods served ==
The community served five public housing facilities in proximity to one another; one, Fairfield Court, is on the other side of the street from the high school.

== Operations ==
Circa 2015 the school used metal detectors and had six security guards. April Hawkins, the principal, stated her belief that the school should have more guards.

== Demographics ==
Circa 2015 there were 974 students and approximately 97% were African American.

== Student performance ==
Circa 2015, of the entire student body, the number with plans to attend a four-year college or university was fewer than thirty.

== Alumni ==
- Maggie Lena Walker (1864–1934), banker, activist, editor
- Mary Burrell (1865–?), businessperson, activist, organizer
- Wendell Dabney (1865–1952), civil rights organizer, author, musician
- Virginia Estelle Randolph (1870–1958), internationally recognized educator with Henrico County Public Schools
- Elizabeth Coles Bouey (1891–1957), missionary; founded the National Association of Ministers' Wives
- Ethel Furman (1893–1976), [transferred to Germantown High School] architect; first-known African-American female architect in Virginia
- Jean L. Harris (1931–2001), First African-American to be admitted to medical school in Virginia, former mayor of Eden Prairie, Minnesota, first African-American cabinet member in Virginia, the secretary of human resources
- William Ferguson Reid (born 1925), Richmond physician (surgeon), civil rights activist, and member of the Virginia General Assembly.
- Clarence L. Townes Jr. (1928–2017), businessperson, politician, and civic leader
- Benjamin Leroy Wigfall (1930–2017), painter, printmaker, teacher, gallery owner, collector
- Douglas Wilder (born 1931), the first African-American governor of Virginia.
- Wesley L. Harris (born 1941), aerospace engineer, professor at MIT
- Carlton Dabney (born 1947), football player for the Atlanta Falcons
