= Richmond High School =

Richmond High School can refer to one of these schools:

Australia

- Richmond High School (Victoria)
- Richmond High School (New South Wales)

Canada

- Richmond Secondary School in Richmond, British Columbia

United Kingdom

- Richmond School, Richmond, North Yorkshire, one of whose constituent schools was Richmond High School for Girls

United States

- Richmond High School (Richmond, California)
- Richmond-Burton Community High School, Illinois
- Richmond High School (Richmond, Indiana)
- Richmond High School (Richmond, Kentucky), a defunct historically segregated African-American school
- Richmond High School (Richmond, Michigan)
- Richmond High School (Missouri) in Richmond, Missouri
- Richmond Community High School in Richmond, Virginia
- Richmond High School (Richmond, Virginia), defunct
