= Rodney Robinson =

American teacher (born 1978)

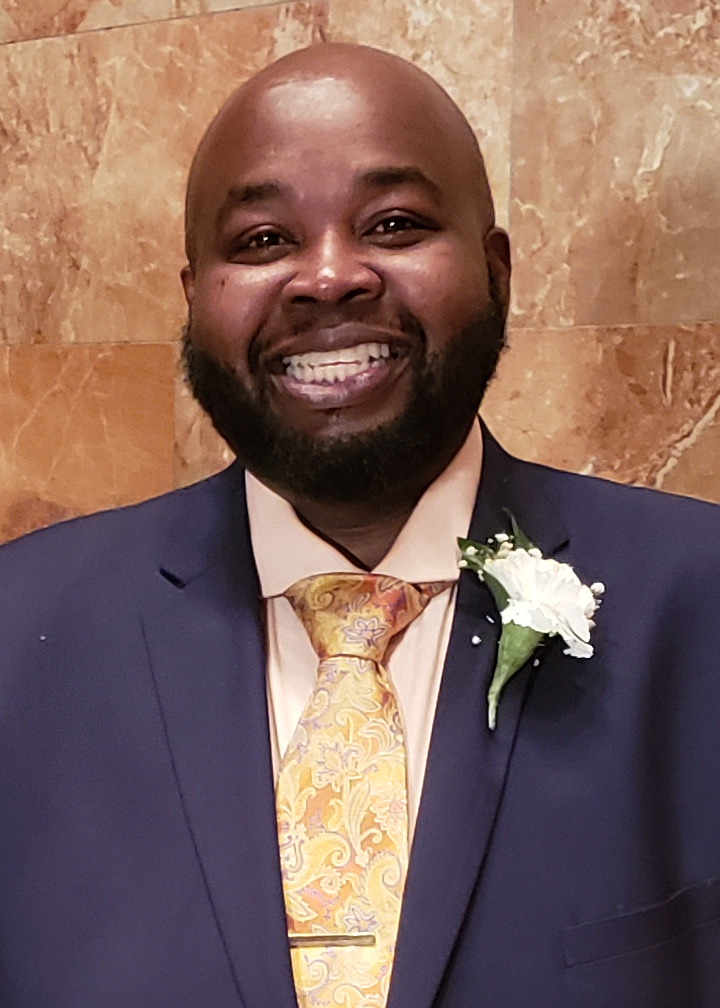
- Robinson in 2018
- Born: Rodney Alexander Robinson; September 9, 1978 (age 47); Richmond, Virginia, U.S.
- Occupations: Social studies and history educator
- Years active: 2000—present
- Known for: 2019 National Teacher of the Year

Rodney Alexander Robinson (born September 9, 1978) is an American educator. After teaching for over a decade in middle and high schools in Richmond, Virginia, he became a social studies and history teacher for grades 6 through 12 at the Virgie Binford Education Center, located inside the Richmond Juvenile Detention Center. He was named Virginia Teacher of the Year in 2018 and National Teacher of the Year in 2019.

== Early life and education ==
Rodney Alexander Robinson was born on September 9, 1978, in Richmond, Virginia. He was inspired to become a teacher by his mother, Sylvia, who had wanted to be a teacher but did not have the opportunity in segregated Virginia. Instead she operated an at-home daycare and worked to get a GED. Robinson remembers "(w)atching her work hard to get her GED when I was in high school [while she worked full-time and raised a family] — that was a lasting memory". His father had pushed Robinson toward college by having him work as a farmhand in eighth grade; Robinson lasted only a couple of hours at the job.

Robinson received his bachelor's degree in history from Virginia State University and a master's in educational administration and supervision from Virginia Commonwealth University. Robinson was steered to Virginia State by the assistant principal of his high school who met Robinson after he flipped a desk reacting to a racially derogatory statement by a teacher.

Robinson is married. His wife, Summer Robinson, is also a teacher in Richmond.

== Career ==
Robinson, known to some of his students as "Big Rob", began teaching in 2000. He taught for 11 years at Armstrong High School in Richmond, as well as at Lucille M. Brown Middle School and George Wythe High School. In 2015, he was hired as a social studies and history teacher for grades 6 through 12 at the Virgie Binford Education Center, located inside the Richmond Juvenile Detention Center in Richmond, Virginia.

Every kid is different and all of them must be treated as if they're different. It goes back to the equity versus equality argument – give every student what they need, not necessarily what is fair.

— Rodney Robinson

Robinson was inspired to work with incarcerated youth because of his desire to teach kids who most needed it. Upon entering his classroom at the detention center, he decorated the blank walls with college banners for Ivy League, Virginia, and historically black colleges and universities, and with inspirational quotes from noted African Americans. Robinson's students at Virgie Binford are normally in his class only for short periods of time, during which he tries to get many of them who are behind academically back on track so they can graduate. He describes his philosophy as one that focuses on the whole child: "You encourage social, emotional growth before you get to academic growth. Showing the kid that you care about them, you care about their well-being, and you want them to be a better person, when they see that, they tend to buy into whatever teaching strategy or methods you engage them with". The rules of the detention center limit the kind of teaching he would like to do, making it harder to do project-based learning for instance. He tries to help his students integrate back into society, including making sure they are registered to vote, if eligible. If they are ineligible because of felony convictions, he teaches them how to get their rights restored.

Owing to the close relationship he has with his students, Robinson has had to seek therapy in order to help process the trauma they experience, including numerous students who have been shot.

== Other activities ==
Robinson is a volunteer coach and officiator for Little League games in the East End community of Richmond. He also serves as the public address announcer at sporting events for Armstrong High School.

He is involved in city historic preservation efforts, including participating in cemetery cleanup projects and leading historical tours for education groups visiting the city.

== Memberships and affiliations ==
Robinson is a member of the Education Compact Team, a group of educators, business and community leaders, and politicians formed by Richmond Mayor Levar Stoney. Robinson also liaises with municipal leaders and local colleges "to recruit underrepresented male teachers into the field of education". Robinson has contributed to the Yale Teacher's Institute in the development of curricula dealing with "race, class, and punishment".

== Awards and honors ==
Robinson received the R.E.B. Award for Teaching Excellence in 2012. In 2018, he was named Virginia Teacher of the Year and in 2019 he was recognized as National Teacher of the Year. He described his reaction to winning the national award as humbling and noted: "as a black male educator, we're put in this box where we're told to only coach, only deal with difficult kids, only do discipline, and we fight to try to escape that box, and now here I was being chosen to represent all teachers and students in America. It was validating".

There was some controversy over whether Robinson would decide to visit the White House to be honored, but eventually he decided to go. He met with President Donald Trump in the Oval Office after Trump broke with tradition by not personally presenting the award to Robinson. Robinson planned to use his platform as National Teacher of the Year to advocate for more even funding of schools between rich and poor and to increase the number of minority men who become teachers.
