= Jason Kamras =

American schoolteacher (born 1973)

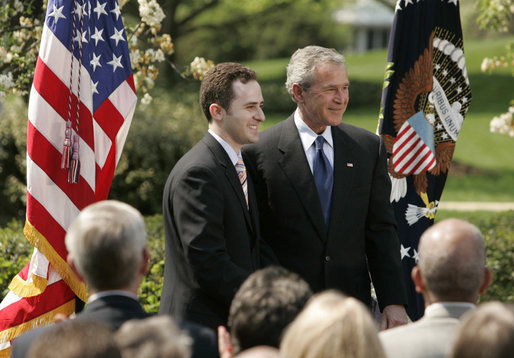
Jason Kamras, 2005 Teacher of the Year, and President George W. Bush in the White House Rose Garden.

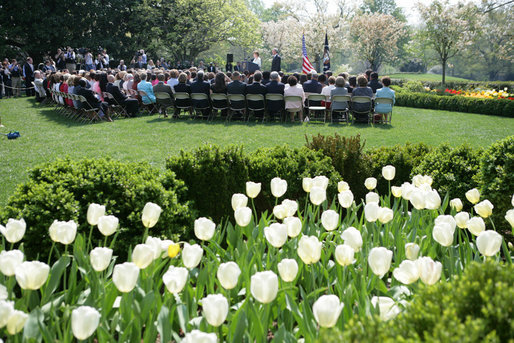
Rose Garden ceremony honoring the National Teacher of the Year Jason Kamras, April 20, 2005.

Jason Kamras (born December 12, 1973) was selected as the 2005 National Teacher of the Year and was an adviser on education policy to the 2008 Barack Obama presidential campaign. He now serves as Superintendent of Richmond Public Schools (RPS).

Prior to his current role, Kamras served in a number of senior roles at District of Columbia Public Schools (DCPS). His work was instrumental to DCPS achieving unprecedented gains in student learning, student and staff satisfaction, graduation rates, and enrollment, prompting former Secretary of Education Arne Duncan to highlight DCPS as one of the fastest improving urban districts in the nation.

Kamras began his career in education in 1996 as a seventh and eighth grade mathematics teacher at John Philip Sousa Middle (formerly Junior High) School (DCPS), a National Historic Landmark for its role in desegregating public education in the nation's capital. He taught at Sousa for eight years, receiving numerous awards, including the Mayor's Arts Award for infusing photography into his mathematics instruction.

Kamras views public education as means of promoting equity and justice for all children in the United States.

Kamras holds a bachelor's degree in public policy from Princeton University and a master's degree in education from the Harvard Graduate School of Education.
