= Urtubey =

Urtubey or Ortubay is a Basque-language surname. Notable people with the surname include:

== Urtubey ==
- Juan Manuel Urtubey (born 1969), Argentine lawyer and politician
- Juliana Urtubey, American teacher

== Ortubay ==
- Miren Ortubay Fuentes (born 1958), Spanish lawyer and criminologist
