= Mary Burrell =

American educator and businessperson

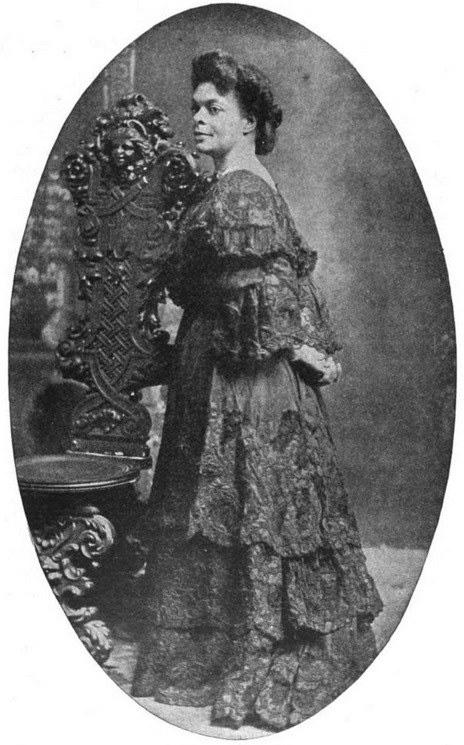
- Born: Mary Elizabeth Cary; August 1865; Richmond, Virginia
- Education: Richard Colored Normal School
- Occupations: Educator, businesswoman

Mary Elizabeth Cary Burrell (August 1865 – ) was an American educator and businessperson. She is known for being a school teacher and for working for causes like women's suffrage.

== Early life ==
Burrell was born in August 1865 in Richmond, Virginia, the daughter of Beverly and Lucy Cary (or Carey). Her father worked in a tobacco factory.

Burrell graduated from the Richmond Colored Normal School in June 1883. Richmond's public schools were segregated at the time, and the plan was for black students to receive their diplomas in a church, while white students graduated in a theater. The graduating black seniors protested the segregated graduation ceremony, and were able to force the school to combine graduations at the school auditorium, although seating was still segregated. Fellow graduating senior Wendell Dabney claimed that this was "the first school strike of Negroes in America." Maggie Lena Walker was another of the ten graduating seniors from Richmond Colored Normal School that year.

== Career and family ==
Burrell taught in the Richmond Public Schools from her graduation in 1883 until 1885 when she married William Patrick Burrell, who likewise had graduated from the Richmond Colored Normal School, the year after she did. Mary Burrell and her husband were early members of the Grand Fountain of the United Order of True Reformers, a fraternal organization which grew to offer insurance, banking services, real estate services, a retirement home, and educational opportunities to members. As a member of the Grand Fountain, Mary Burrell founded new lodges as well as expanded the number of youth education programs (called 'Rosebud') which were organized by the lodges to teach financial skills. She served as first clerk for the bank, training other clerks, and was president of the Rosebud Board. She served in the leadership of multiple social organizations, including the Women's Auxiliary of Richmond Hospital, the Virginia State Federation of Colored Women, and the Women's Baptist Educational and Missionary Convention of the State of Virginia. She organized social gatherings in her home in Richmond, with prominent guests who included Booker T. Washington. She raised two sons, William Preston (1893) and John Mercer (1894).

In 1910, financial scandal and fraud struck and the Grand Fountain was forced to shutter most of its businesses. Mary Burrell and her husband relocated to New Jersey, where they resumed their work building social organizations. Mary Burrell was involved in women's suffrage, and later worked on get-out-the vote programs and various political organizations.

== Links ==
A photo of Mrs. Mary E. Cary Burrell.
