= J. E. B. Stuart Elementary School =

J. E. B. Stuart Elementary School can mean:

- J. E. B. Stuart Elementary School. Norfolk, Virginia; now closed

It is also the former name of these schools:

- Barack Obama Elementary School, Richmond, Virginia
- Pleasants Lane Elementary, Petersburg, Virginia
