= Richmond Free Press =

American newspaper in Richmond, Virginia

- Type: Weekly newspaper
- Format: Broadsheet
- Owner(s): Paradigm Communications, Inc.
- Publisher: Jean Patterson Boone
- Managing editor: Craig Belcher
- Founded: January 16, 1992
- Ceased publication: February 12, 2026
- Political alignment: Center-left
- Headquarters: 422 East Franklin Street; Richmond, Virginia 23219; United States
- Circulation: 19,817 (as of 2021)
- Website: richmondfreepress.com

The Richmond Free Press was an independent newspaper in Richmond, Virginia. Published on a weekly basis for thirty-four years, it focused on covering issues of concern for the city's African-American community and its poorest residents. Raymond H. Boone, its founder, started the paper in part because he felt these groups were underrepresented in the mainstream media.

== History ==
Raymond H. Boone and Jean Patterson Boone founded the paper in 1992, and Raymond H. Boone served as its managing editor and publisher until his death on June 3, 2014. Virginia Governor Terry McAuliffe eulogized Boone as “a true Virginia legend” whose "life devoted to justice, equality and a well-informed public discourse, and I know that commitment will live on thanks to his leadership at the Richmond Free Press.” Prior to publishing the Richmond Free Press, Boone, who graduated from Boston University with a B.A. in journalism and Howard University with a M.A. in political science, taught journalism at Howard University for almost a decade. Boone was inducted into the Virginia Communications Hall of Fame in 2000, and in 2006, he received the Virginia NAACP’s highest honor, the Oliver W. Hill Freedom Fighter Award.

Jean Patterson Boone took over the role of publisher and president upon her husband's death in 2014. Her son, Raymond Boone, Jr. was vice president. Her daughter, Regina H. Boone, worked at the newspaper as a staff photojournalist. Other contributors included A. Peter Bailey and Clarence L. Townes Jr..

In 2020, the newspaper's coverage of anti-racism and Black Lives Matter protests in Richmond, and in particular, the toppling of Confederate monuments on the city's Monument Avenue, was highlighted due in part to Richmond's historical status as the former capital of the Confederacy. In 2026, the Free Press ceased publication.

== Awards ==
The paper won honors and awards for excellence in journalism, including awards from the National Newspaper Publishers Association, as well as the Virginia Press Association.
