= Shanna Peeples =

American educator (born 1965)

Shanna L. Peeples
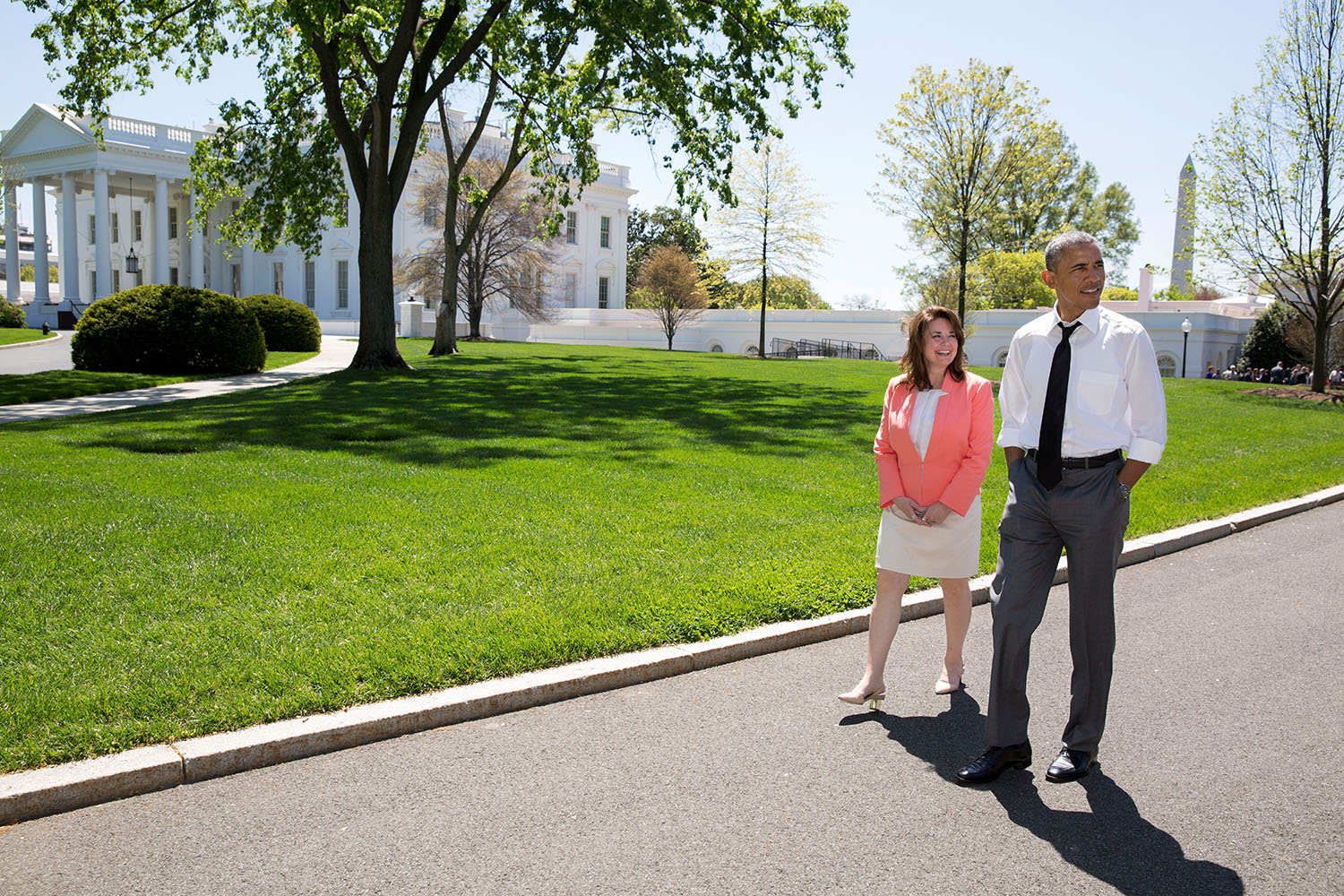
- Peeples with Barack Obama, 2015
- Born: April 16, 1965 (age 61); Borger, Texas, United States
- Occupations: Assistant Professor, Education and Social Sciences
- Known for: 2015 National Teacher of the Year
- Title: Dr. John G. O' Brien Distinguished Chair in Education
- Children: 3
- Awards: National Teacher of the Year

Academic background
- Education: Harvard University, West Texas A&M University, University of Texas at Arlington

Academic work
- Institutions: West Texas A&M University

Shanna L. Peeples (born 16 April 1965) is the Dr. John G. O'Brien Distinguished Chair in Education at West Texas A&M University. She was the 2015 National Teacher of the Year.

== Education ==
Peeples has a BA in English from West Texas A&M University (1997), an M.Ed. from the University of Texas at Arlington (2013), and a PhD from Harvard University (2020).

== Career ==
Peeples had multiple jobs before she began teaching, starting with a 7th grade class. By 2011, she was teaching at Palo Duro High School in Amarillo, Texas. In 2015, Peeples was named National Teacher of the Year, and was presented her award by President Barack Obama. In 2020 she was named the Dr. John G. O'Brien Distinguished Chair in Education at West Texas A&M University.

Peeples has spoken against arming teachers in the classroom and advocates for same sex marriage. Peeples has stated that she is a lesbian.

== Selected publications ==
- Peeples, Shanna (2019). Think like Socrates : using questions to invite wonder and empathy into the classroom, grades 4–12. Thousand Oaks, California: Sage Publications. ISBN 978-1-5063-9163-2. OCLC 1260211375.
- Peeples, Shanna (2017-04-06). "School Isn't Uber and Never Should Be". Observer.
- Peeples, Shanna (Summer 2016). "DARE to go FIRST". Educational Leadership. 73 (9): 10–14 – via EBSCO.
