= Ethel Furman =

American architect

Ethel B. Furman
- Born: Ethel Madison Bailey; July 6, 1893; Richmond, Virginia, United States
- Died: February 24, 1976 (aged 82)
- Occupation: Architect
- Spouse(s): William H. Carter (1912-1918); Joseph D. Furman (1918-)

Ethel Bailey Furman (née Ethel Madison Bailey; July 6, 1893—February 24, 1976) was an American architect who was the earliest known African-American female architect in Virginia.

== Biography ==
Ethel Madison Bailey was born in Richmond, Virginia. She was the daughter of Margaret M. Jones Bailey and Madison J. Bailey.

She married William H. Carter on October 12, 1912, in New Jersey, and they had two children. Their daughter, Thelma Carter Henderson was born in 1914 in Buffalo, New York and their son, Madison Carter, was born in 1916 in Lakawana, New York. Having divorced Carter by 1918, she married Joseph D. Furman, a Pullman porter for the New York Central Railroad. Together they had a son named J. Livingston Furman.

After training in New York City, she returned to Richmond in 1921 and began designing houses for locals. Furman worked with her father, and also raised three children. During this time she worked other jobs to supplement income to raise her family. As an African-American woman she experienced discrimination in the architecture community, as local bureaucrats refused to accept her as the architect of record on her own projects. Consequently, she would often have to submit her job proposals through male contractors with whom she worked.

== Education ==
As a child Furman started to gain knowledge on architecture and the building arts by shadowing her father, Madison J. Bailey, who was the second licensed Black building contractor in Richmond. Over time, this informal education allowed Bailey to take on some of the drafting duties for her father's business. Furman briefly attended Armstrong High School in Richmond, Virginia before her family moved to Philadelphia. She graduated from Germantown High School in North Philadelphia in 1910. At one point in her training she moved to New York City where she studied architecture privately by Edward R. Williams, a Black architect. In the late 1920s she was the only woman to attend the Hampton Institute's annual builder's conference. She trained in drafting through Chicago Technical College into the 1940s.

== Notable works ==
Furman designed over 200 churches and residences in Virginia and two churches in Liberia, including the Fourth Baptist Church Educational Wing which still stands in the historic Church Hill district of Richmond, Virginia.

To recognize her contributions to the field of architecture, a park in Richmond was named after her in 1985. In 2010, Furman was honored as one of the Library of Virginia's "Virginia Women in History" for her civic work and accomplishments in the field of architecture.

== Later life ==
Furman died in 1976.
