= Clarence L. Townes Jr. =

American politician (1928–2017)

Clarence Lee Townes Jr.
- Born: January 21, 1928; Richmond, Virginia, U.S.
- Died: January 11, 2017 (aged 88); Richmond, Virginia, U.S.
- Education: Virginia Union University (BS)
- Occupations: Businessperson, politician, civic activist
- Political party: Republican
- Spouse: Grace Elizabeth Harris (m. 1951)
- Children: 4

Clarence Lee Townes Jr. (January 21, 1928 – January 11, 2017) was an American businessperson, politician, and civic activist from Richmond, Virginia. He served as an officer with the U.S. Army in the Korean War.

== Early life and education ==
Townes was born on January 21, 1928 in Richmond, Virginia, the son of Clarence L. Townes Sr. and Alice Smith. He attended Armstrong High School and graduated in 1944.

After high school, he attended Virginia Union University, where he received his B.S. degree in 1948. After serving in the Korean War as a second lieutenant in the U.S. Army, he became involved in the Virginia Mutual Benefit Life Insurance Company, later becoming its training director.

== Political career ==
Townes made significant strides in the Republican Party, despite the shifting political landscape for African Americans. His involvement included serving on the Richmond City Republican Committee and becoming the first Black delegate from Virginia at the 1964 Republican National Convention. In 1965, he ran for a Virginia House of Delegates seat, drawing attention to increased African American political participation in the South.

His commitment to the Republican Party extended to national roles, including positions with the Republican National Committee (RNC), where he focused on minority engagement. Later, Townes co-founded the Joint Center for Political Affairs, aiding newly elected Black officials.

== After politics ==
After politics, Townes engaged in community initiatives. He co-founded the Jefferson Townhouse Corporation and served on the board of the Consolidated Bank and Trust Company, the nation's oldest African American-controlled bank. Additionally, he played pivotal roles in education, consultancy on equal employment matters, and entrepreneurship, establishing Metropolitan Coach, an African American-owned charter bus line.

In the 1980s, Townes chaired Richmond Renaissance, a corporation fostering downtown economic development. His community involvement extended into the 1990s, contributing to the Richmond Free Press, serving on the Richmond School Board, and as a board member of various institutions.

He died on January 11, 2017 in Richmond, aged 88.

== Personal life ==
In 1951, he married Grace Elizabeth Harris; they had four children.
