= Lefty Bowers =

American baseball player

- Pitcher
- Born: August 24, 1909; Richmond, Virginia, U.S.
- Died: December 6, 1978 (aged 69); Baltimore, Maryland, U.S.
- Batted: Unknown Threw: Left

Negro league baseball debut
- 1926, for the Baltimore Black Sox

Last appearance
- 1927, for the Baltimore Black Sox
- Stats at Baseball Reference

Teams
- Baltimore Black Sox (1926-1927)

Norman Otis "Lefty" Bowers (August 24, 1909 – December 6, 1978), also listed as Chuck Bowers, and Jimmy Bowers, was an American professional baseball pitcher in the Negro leagues. He played with the Baltimore Black Sox in 1926 and 1927.

== Career ==
Bowers attended Richmond High School in Richmond, Virginia, and at age 17, he received a tryout with the Baltimore Black Sox. He made his debut in the final game of a series against the Cuban Stars (East). He allowed five hits in six innings, with the game being called at that point due to darkness. He then earned a contract, and pitched in at least five recorded games over two seasons with Baltimore.
