= Lon Myers =

American sprinter and middle-distance runner (1858–1899)

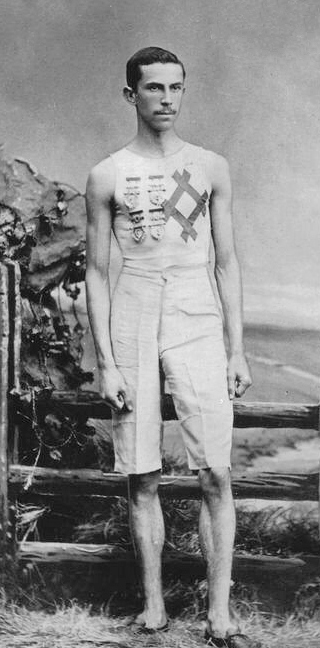
- Lon Myers in 1880

Personal information
- Born: Laurence Eugene Myers; February 16, 1858 Richmond, Virginia, U.S.
- Died: February 16, 1899 (aged 41)

Sport
- Sport: Running
- Event: 50 yards to one mile
- Club: Manhattan Athletic Club
- Turned pro: 1886

Achievements and titles
- National finals: 15 United States, 10 Canadian, and 3 British national championships
- Highest world ranking: World records at: 250 yards (26.0 seconds; 1882); 350 (36.8; 1881); 400 (43.625; 1882); 440 on grass (49.4; 1885); 500 (58.0; 1880); 600 (1:11.4; 1882); 660 (1:22.0; 1880); 800 (1:44.4; 1882); 840 on grass (1:48.6; 1885); 880 on grass (1:56.5; 1885); 1,000 (2:13.0; 1881)

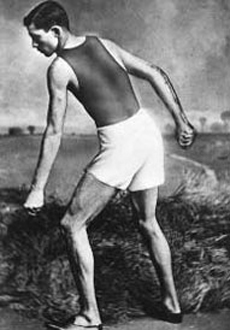
Lon Myers

Laurence Eugene "Lon" Myers (February 16, 1858 – February 16, 1899) was an American sprinter and middle-distance runner.

Myers won 28 national championships. He also set world records at 11 different distances, and held every American record for races 50 yards to one mile Myers set a world quarter-mile record while running the final 120 yards without his right shoe, and finished another race that he won running sideways (in conversation with a runner who had boasted that he would defeat Myers).

== Early life ==
Myers was Jewish, and was born in Richmond, Virginia, to Solomon H. Myers, a clerk. He was in the first graduating class of Richmond High School. His father moved the family to Jersey City, New Jersey, in 1875 after he graduated high school, and then to New York City, where he became a bookkeeper.

== Track career ==
=== Amateur ===
During his 21-year career, Myers held every American record for races 50 yards to one mile. He won 15 United States national championships, 10 Canadian national championships, and 3 British national championships. From 1880 to 1888, he held the world records in the 100-yard, 440-yard, and 880-yard races.

Myers began running competitively in 1878, for the Knickerbocker Yacht Club. He then ran for the bulk of his career for the Manhattan Athletic Club.

Myers was the first runner to run the quarter-mile in under 50 seconds (49.2), doing so in 1879. On September 20, 1879, he ran the quarter-mile in 49.5 seconds despite running the final 120 yards without his right shoe, setting a world record. At the 1879 U.S. Amateur Athletic Union (AAU) national championships, Myers won the 220 (22.75), 440 (49.2), and 880, setting records in each event.

In 1880, he won the AAU national championship 220, 440, and 880 races and the 100-yard dash, all in the same day. He won the same four races three days later at the Canadian Nationals. That year, he set an American record in the 100-yard dash (10.0 seconds; tying two others), and world records in the 250 (26.25 seconds), 300, 320 (35.125 seconds), 500 (58 seconds), 600 (1:11.4), 660 (1:22.0), 880 (1:56.125), 1,000 (2:18.25), and mile (4:29.50). Unusual distances in some of the races were a product of the fact that tracks at the time varied in length.

In 1881, after a runner in England boasted as to how he would fare against Myers in a 440 race, Myers finished the race running sideways and asking the fellow whether he might not be able to run faster—before beating him by five yards, in 48.6 seconds. That year he also lowered the world record in the 880 to 1:55.5 (beating his nearest competitor by 100 yards), and the world record in the 1,000 to 2:13. In 1881 he also set the world record in the half mile (1:56); he lowered it to 1:55.4 in 1884. He also set the world record in the 350, at 36.8 seconds, and 1,000 yards, at 2:13.0.

Walter George, the top British miler, faced Myers over a series of three races in November 1882. A total of 130,000 attended these races at the Polo Grounds in New York City. In the first, Myers beat George 1:56 3/5 to 1:57 in the 880 yards. The next week, George led all the way in defeating his rival 4:21 2/5 to 4:27 3/5 in the mile. In the final 3/4 mile showdown, 60,000 watched George and Myers battle on a cold day on a bad track. George led narrowly with a 61 2/5 and 2:02¾ before Myers took the lead. But Myers staggered at the end and collapsed after crossing in 3:13 – behind George who won in 3:10½. Both fell unconscious after the race and George described it as "the most gruelling race I ever ran."

Myers subsequently was with greater frequency not allowed to participate in some races, as few runners wanted to compete against him. In 1882, he set world records at 250 yards (26.0), 400 yards (43.625), and 800 yards (1:44.4), and American records in a sixth-of-a-mile hurdle race (37.125) and at 700 yards (1:31). In 1884, he set the American record in the 50-yard dash, at 5.5 seconds, and the 880, at 1:55.4. In 1885, after setting world records in the 440 on grass (49.4), the 840 on grass (1:48.6), and the 880 on grass (1:56.5), he announced that he intended to retire.

In his career he set world records in 11 different distances: the 250 (26.0 seconds; 1882), 350 (36.8; 1881), 400 (43.675; 1882), 440 on grass (49.4; 1885), 500 (58.0; 1880), 600 (1:11.4; 1882), 660 (1:22.0; 1880), 800 (1:44.4; 1882), 840 on grass (1:48.6; 1885), 880 on grass (1:56.5; 1885), and 1,000 (2:13.0; 1881). He also set American records in the 50-yard dash (5.5 seconds, amateur record; 1884), 100-yard dash (10.0; tying two others; 1880), 200 (20.3; 1881), 300 (31.375; 1881), 440 (48.6; 1881), 700 (1:31; 1882), 880 (1:55.4; 1884), 1,320 (3:13, 1882), and the mile (4:22.6; 1882).

=== Professional ===
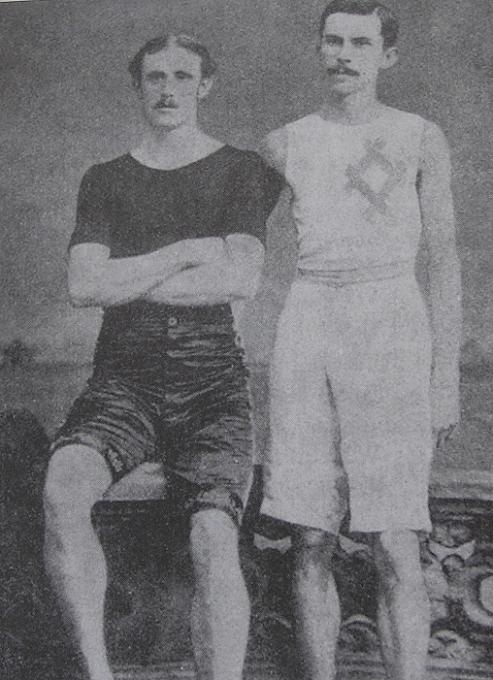
Myers (on the right), with Walter George

The press in England had cast doubt on Myers' performances, asserting that Americans were deficient in the ability to time races properly, and questioning the accuracy of American watches. Myers came out of retirement and became a professional in 1886 to run against English champion Walter George, the world record holder in the mile. George had become a professional two years earlier, and had challenged Myers. They competed in the "Middle Distance Championship of the World", before thousands of fans at Madison Square Garden.

Myers beat George at 1,000 yards, 1,320 yards, and 1 mile, and received the $3,000 ($107,000 in current dollar terms) prize.

The following year Myers faced George in the same contest in Australia at the half, 3/4 and full mile. Myers won the first event, and George won the other two.

Myers died of pneumonia on February 16, 1899, in New York City. He was buried in Kensico Cemetery.

== Halls of fame ==
He was inducted into the USA Track and Field Hall of Fame in 1974 and into the International Jewish Sports Hall of Fame in 1980.

== See also ==
- List of select Jewish track and field athletes
