= Adult Career Development Center (Richmond, Virginia) =

Coordinates: 37°32′57.2″N 77°26′28.2″W

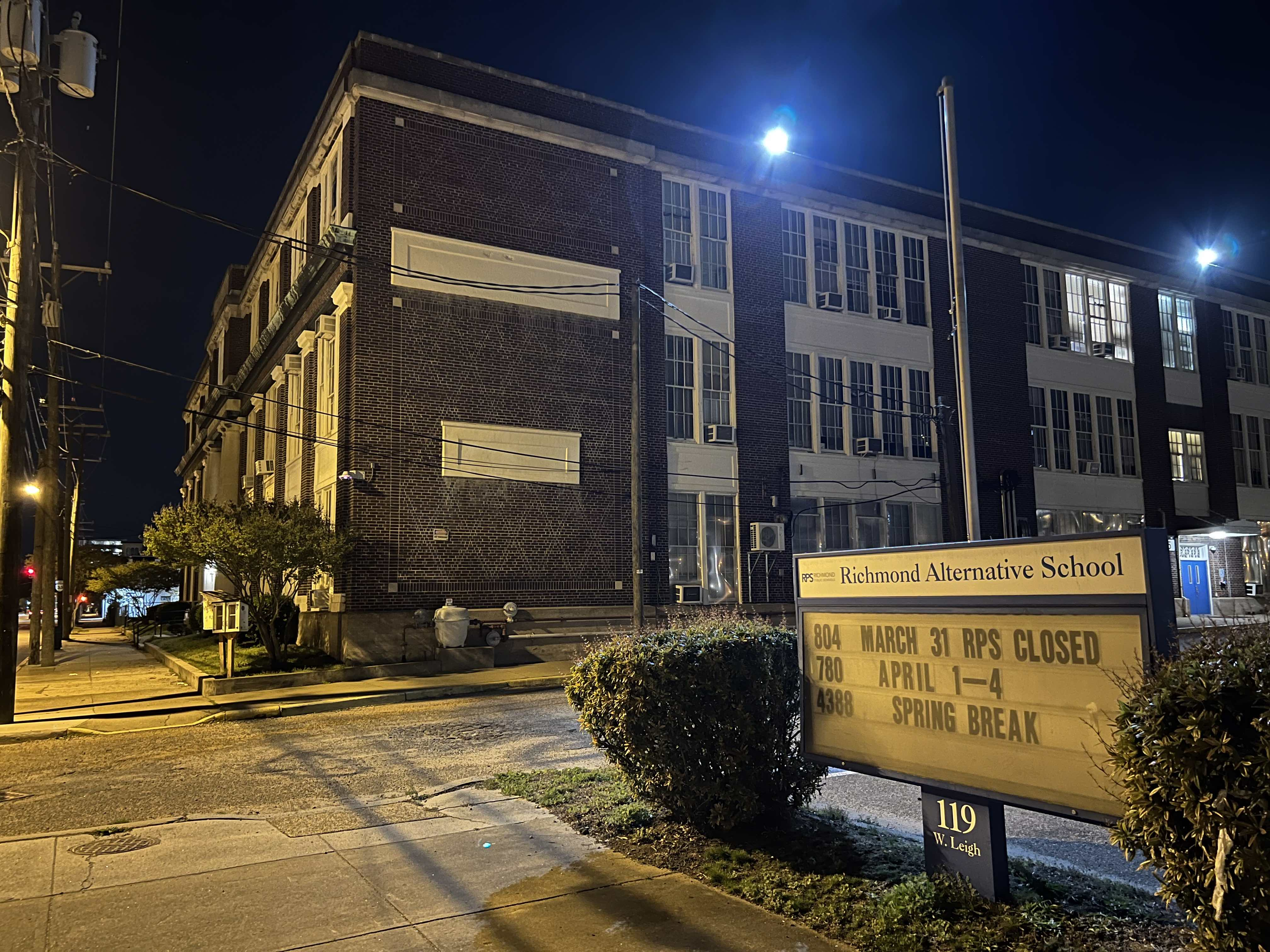

Location
- 119 W. Leigh St. Richmond, Virginia 23223; United States

Information
- School type: Public high school Alternative School
- Founded: 1975
- School district: Richmond Public Schools
- Principal: April Hawlins
- Language: English
- Campus: Urban
- Website: Adult Career Development Center

The Richmond Adult Career Development Center is an alternative school located in Richmond, Virginia, United States, and is part of the Richmond Public Schools system. The ACDC was established in 1975 and is a non-traditional public school providing all age groups access to programs that may help satisfy certain aspects of their formal educational. The center is also the site of Richmond Alternative School which is the home school for regular high school seniors who will graduate with a standard or advanced high school diploma.
