= National Teacher of the Year =

Professional teaching award in the United States

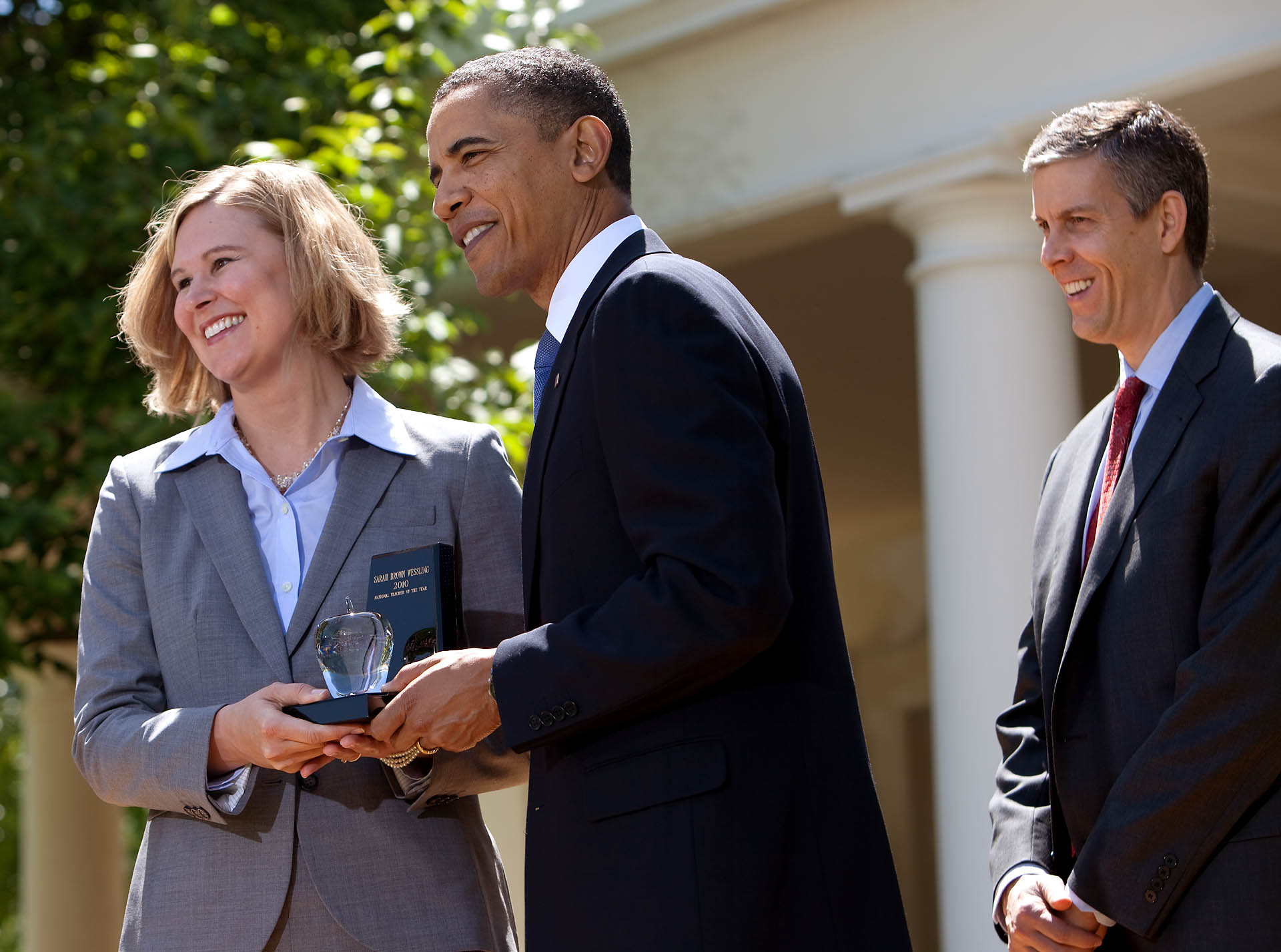
2010 Teacher of the Year, Sarah Brown Wessling, with President Barack Obama and Secretary of Education Arne Duncan.

The National Teacher of the Year is a professional award in the United States. The program began in 1952, as a project by the Council of Chief State School Officers (CCSSO), and aims to reward excellence in teaching. It is sponsored by ING.

== Selection process ==
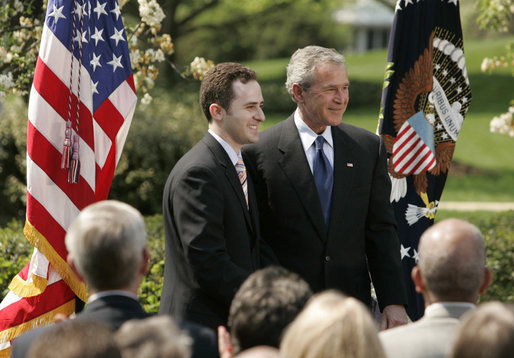
Jason Kamras, 2005 Teacher of the Year, and President George W. Bush in the White House Rose Garden.

Every year, nominations are made by students, principals, teachers and administrators for the State Teacher of the Year awards. The profiles of the winners from all 50 states, the District of Columbia, American Samoa, Guam, Northern Mariana Islands, and U.S. Virgin Islands and the Department of Defense Education Activity are submitted to a selection committee made up of representatives from each of the major education organizations. The committee then reviews the data for each candidate and selects four finalists. The winner is chosen from these finalists based on their biography, interview and eight essays they must submit. The President of the United States traditionally presents the award in the White House Rose Garden.

Although there are no clearly defined requirements, the committee looks for:

- The ability to inspire children from all backgrounds and abilities
- The respect of colleagues, students, and parents
- Activity in the community
- The ability to fulfill the duties of the award

== Duties ==
The National Teacher of The Year spends a year away from their teaching duties to serve as a spokesman and advocate for the teaching profession. The teacher's state and district continue to pay his/her salary in this year. The arrangements for travel and speaking engagements during the recognition year are taken care of by the CCSSO.

== Harassment and politics ==
Several state winners in the 2020s reported harassment, including death threats, for having pro-LGBT views or being gay. Two were forced to abdicate their responsibilities. Some states (like Georgia) require winners to be apolitical. Others look for candidates that support certain political positions, such as the Arkansas education reform law that limited classroom discussion of critical race theory and LGBT people, or anti-racism in Massachusetts.

== Recipients ==
2026	Leon Smith	AP U.S. History and African American Studies	Haverford High School in Havertown, Pennsylvania
2025	Ashlie Crosson	English	Mifflin Country School District, Lewistown, Pennsylvania
2024	Missy Testerman	English as a second language (ESL)	Rogersville City School, Rogersville, Tennessee
2023	Rebecka Peterson	Mathematics	Union High School, Tulsa, Oklahoma
2022	Kurt Russell	History	Oberlin Senior High School, Oberlin, Ohio
2021	Juliana Urtubey	Special education	Kermit R. Booker Sr. Innovative Elementary School, Las Vegas, Nevada
2020	Tabatha Rosproy	Preschool, Early Learning	Winfield Early Learning Center, Winfield, Kansas
2019	Rodney Robinson	Social Studies, History	Virgie Binford Education Center, Richmond, Virginia
2018	Mandy Manning	English, Language Arts	Joel E. Ferris High School, Spokane, Washington
2017	Sydney Chaffee	Humanities	Codman Academy Charter Public School, Boston, Massachusetts
2016	Jahana Hayes	History	John F. Kennedy High School, Waterbury, Connecticut
2015	Shanna Peeples	English	Palo Duro High School, Amarillo, Texas
2014	Sean McComb	English	Patapsco High School and Center for the Arts, Baltimore, Maryland
2013	Jeff Charbonneau	Chemistry, Physics, Engineering	Zillah High School, Zillah, Washington
2012	Rebecca Mieliwocki	English	Luther Burbank Middle School, Burbank, California
2011	Michelle Shearer	Chemistry	Urbana High School, Frederick, Maryland
2010	Sarah Brown Wessling	English	Johnston High School, Johnston, Iowa
2009	Anthony Mullen	Special education	The ARCH School, Greenwich, Connecticut
2008	Michael Geisen	Science	Crook County Middle School, Prineville, Oregon
2007	Andrea Peterson	Music	Monte Cristo Elementary School, Granite Falls, Washington
2006	Kimberly Oliver	Kindergarten	Broad Acres Elementary, Silver Spring, Maryland
2005	Jason Kamras	Mathematics	John Philip Sousa Middle School, Washington, D.C.
2004	Kathy Mellor	English as a Second Language	Davisville Middle School, North Kingstown, Rhode Island
2003	Betsy Rogers	Elementary, 1-2 (looping)	Leeds Elementary School, Jefferson County Public Schools, Birmingham, Alabama
2002	Chauncey Veatch	Social Studies	Coachella Valley High School, Thermal, California
2001	Michele Forman	Social Studies	Middlebury Union High School, Middlebury, Vermont
2000	Marilyn Jachetti Whirry, Ph.D.	English	Mira Costa High School, Manhattan Beach, California
1999	Andy Baumgartner	Kindergarten	A. Brian Merry Elementary School, Augusta, Georgia
1998	Philip Bigler	Humanities/History	Thomas Jefferson High School for Science and Technology, Alexandria, Virginia
1997	Sharon M. Draper	English, Language Arts	Walnut Hills High School, Cincinnati, Ohio
1996	Mary Beth Blegen	History, Humanities, Writing	Worthington Senior High School, Worthington, Minnesota
1995	Elaine B. Griffin	K-10 Self Contained Classroom	Chiniak School, Chiniak, Alaska
1994	Sandra L. McBrayer	Self Contained Classroom	Homeless Outreach School, San Diego, California
1993	Tracey Leon Bailey	Science	Satellite High School, Satellite Beach, Florida
1992	Thomas A. Fleming	Special education	Washtenaw Intermediate School District, Ann Arbor, Michigan
1991	Rae Ellen McKee	Remedial Reading	Slanesville Elementary School, Slanesville, West Virginia
1990	Janis T. Gabay	English	Junipero Serra High School, San Diego, California
1989	Mary V. Bicouvaris	Government/International Relations	Bethel High School, Hampton, Virginia
1988	Terry Weeks	Social Studies	Central Middle School, Murfreesboro, Tennessee
1987	Donna H. Oliver	Biology	Hugh M. Cummings High School, Burlington, North Carolina
1986	Guy R. Doud	Language Arts	Brainerd Senior High School, Brainerd, Minnesota
1985	Therese Knecht Dozier	World History	Irmo High School, Columbia, South Carolina
1984	Sherleen S. Sisney	History, Economics and Political Science	Ballard High School, Louisville, Kentucky
1983	LeRoy E. Hay, Ph.D.	English	Manchester High School, Manchester, Connecticut
1982	Bruce E. Brombacher	Mathematics	Jones Junior High School, Upper Arlington, Ohio
1981	Jay Sommer	Foreign Languages	New Rochelle High School, New Rochelle, New York
1980	Beverly J. Bimes	English	Hazelwood East High School, St. Louis, Missouri
1979	Marilyn W. Black	Elementary Art	Bernice A. Ray School, Hanover, New Hampshire
1978	Elaine Barbour	Sixth Grade	Coal Creek Elementary, Montrose, Colorado
1977	Myrra L. Lee	Social Living	Helix High School, La Mesa, California
1976	Ruby S. Murchison	Social Studies	Washington Drive Junior High, Fayetteville, North Carolina
1975	Robert G. Heyer	Science	Johanna Junior High School, St. Paul, Minnesota
1974	Vivian Tom	Social Studies	Lincoln High School, Yonkers, New York
1973	John A. Ensworth	Sixth Grade	Kenwood School, Bend, Oregon
1972	James M. Rogers	American History and Black Studies	Durham High School, Durham, North Carolina
1971	Martha M. Stringfellow	First Grade	Lewisville Elementary, Chester County, South Carolina
1970	Johnnie T. Dennis	Physics and Math Analysis	Walla Walla High School, Walla Walla, Washington
1969	Barbara Goleman	Language Arts	Miami Jackson High School, Miami, Florida
1968	David E. Graf	Vocational Education and Industrial Arts	Sandwich Community High School, Sandwich, Illinois
1967	Roger H. Tenney	Music	Owatonna Junior Senior High School, Owatonna, Minnesota
1966	Mona W. Dayton	First Grade	Walter Douglas Elementary School, Tucson, Arizona
1965	Richard E. Klinck	Sixth Grade	Reed Street Elementary, Wheat Ridge, Colorado
1964	Lawana Trout	English	Charles Page High School, Sand Springs, Oklahoma
1963	Elmon S. Ousley	Speech, American Government	Bellevue Senior High School, Bellevue, Washington
1962	Marjorie French	Mathematics	Topeka High School, Topeka, Kansas
1961	Helen Adams	Kindergarten	Cumberland Public School, Cumberland, Wisconsin
1960	Hazel B. Davenport	First Grade	Central Elementary School, Beckley, West Virginia
1959	Edna Donley	Mathematics and Speech	Alva High School, Alva, Oklahoma
1958	Jean Listebarger Humphrey	Second Grade	Edwards Elementary, Ames, Iowa
1957 (joint)	Eugene G. Bizzell	Speech, English and Debate	A.N. McCallum High School, Austin, Texas
1957 (joint)	Mary F. Schwarz	Third Grade	Bristol Elementary, Kansas City, Missouri
1956	Richard M. Nelson	Science	Flathead County High School, Kalispell, Montana
1955	Margaret Perry	Fourth Grade	Monmouth Elementary, Monmouth, Oregon
1954	Willard C. Widerberg	Seventh Grade	DeKalb Junior High School, DeKalb, Illinois
1953	Dorothy Hamilton	Social Studies	Milford High School, Milford, Connecticut
1952	Geraldine Jones	First Grade	Hope Public School, Santa Barbara, California
