= Juliana Urtubey =

American teacher

- Occupation: Educator
- Years active: 2010–present
- Known for: 2021 National Teacher of the Year

Juliana Urtubey is an American educator in Las Vegas, Nevada. In 2021, Urtubey received the National Teacher of the Year as the first educator from Nevada and the first Latino recipient since 2005.

== Biography ==
Urtubey received a Bachelor of Arts in Bilingual Elementary Education and a Master’s degree in special bilingual education from the University of Arizona. Urtubey also serves as a National Board for Professional Teaching Standards Teacher Fellow, a Neva. Urtubey is currently a special education teacher to elementary school students in Las Vegas, Nevada. In 2021, she received the National Teacher of the Year. In 2022, President Joe Biden also appointed Urtubey to the President's Advisory Commission on Advancing Educational Equity, Excellence, and Economic Opportunity for Hispanics.

== Awards ==
- 2018 Heart of Education Award, The Smith Center for the Performing Arts
- 2019 Chicanos por La Causa Esperanza Latina Teaching Award
- 2019 Hispanic Education Association of Nevada Teacher of the Year
- 2021 National Teacher of the Year Award
