= Richmond Community High School =

High school in Virginia, United States

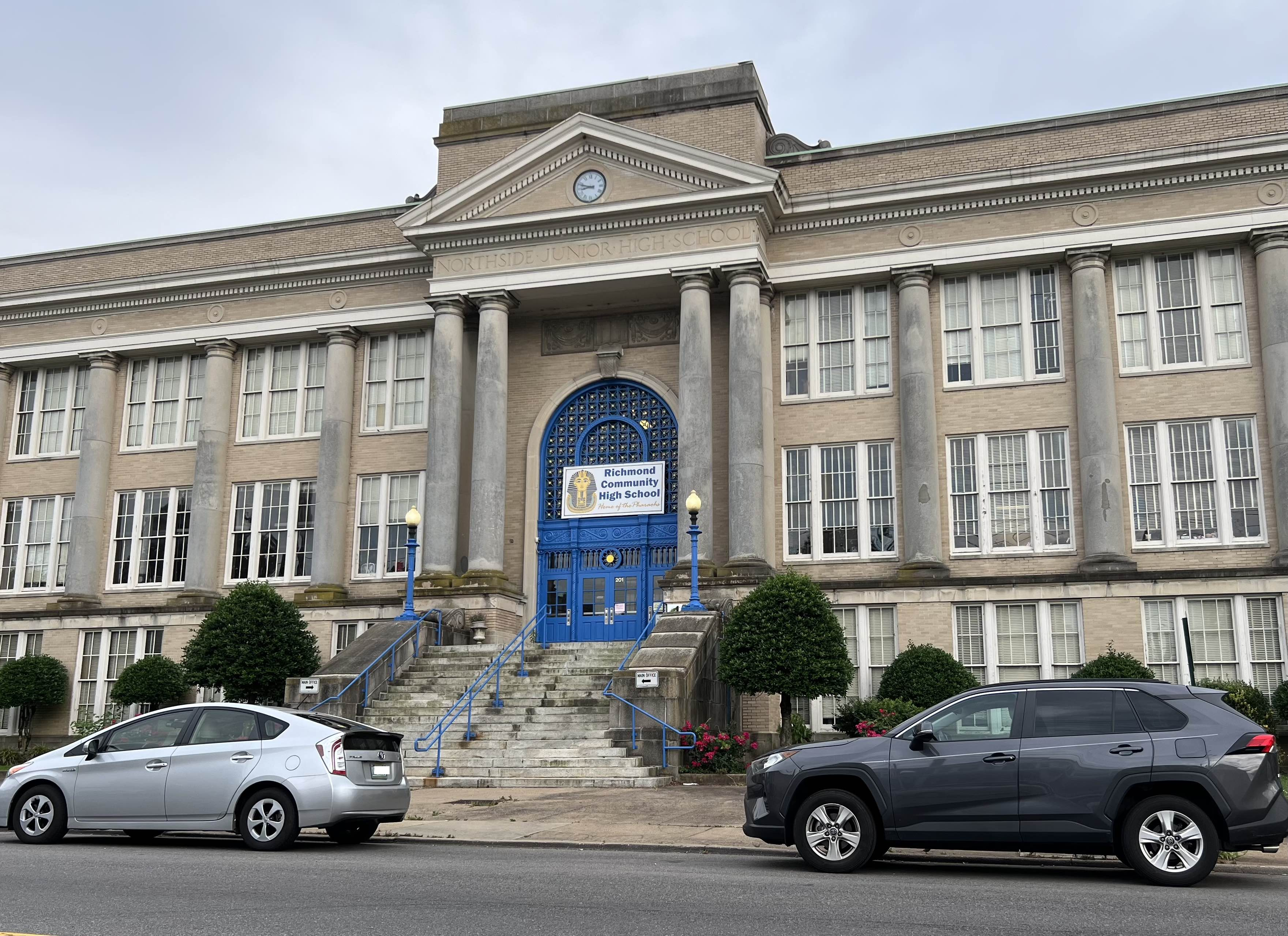

Location
- 201 East Brookland Park Boulevard; Richmond, Virginia 23222; United States; 37°34′15″N 77°25′48″W

Information
- Type: Public secondary school
- School district: Richmond Public Schools
- Principal: Kenya Massenburg
- Teaching staff: 18.85 (on an FTE basis)
- Grades: 9-12
- Enrollment: 225 (2020-21)
- Student to teacher ratio: 11.94
- Mascot: Pharaohs
- Website: rchs.rvaschools.net

Richmond Community High School (RCHS) is an alternative high school operated by the Richmond City Public Schools in Richmond, Virginia, United States. It was founded in 1977 as America's first full-time, four year, public high school for academically talented students.

Richmond Community High School admits applicants from within the city limits who are identified as academically gifted, with a preference for socio-economically challenged students. Virtually all graduates continue to college.

The school is consistently highly ranked by education rankings lists.

== History ==
The school began with a grant from Richmond businessman-philanthropist Andrew J. Asch, Jr. Asch's original grant was made to the Virginia State University Foundation, which assisted Richmond Public Schools with a demonstration program. For the first several months of existence, the project was known within the city schools system as merely the "Secondary School Experiential Learning Community". Asch thought bright students from minority and low-income families should have the cultural and educational opportunities his own children had enjoyed. He remained active in the affairs of the school until his death in 1991.

The school was envisioned by Asch as a public-private partnership that would provide an outstanding education for gifted students whose socioeconomic situation might otherwise limit their ability to succeed. Asch provided leadership and financial support to begin the school, which began in 1977. It graduated its first class in 1981. In 1986, it began admitting a class every year, rather than every other year.

Since the school began, it has graduated over 1600 students. 100% of all students have been accepted to college, and 99% have continued to college.

=== Building ===
The school was initially opened in the Mosque (now the Altria Theater). It was moved to Carver Elementary School, then to the Maggie Walker school building, then to Westhampton Elementary School.

The school is currently housed in the historic J. A. C. Chandler building in the city's Northside on 201 East Brookland Park Boulevard.

== Structure ==
=== Admissions ===
Admission at the school is open to all students in the City, whether they attend public or private schools or are homeschooled.

To be considered for admission, students must complete a rated personal interview with teachers, administrators, and students, and tests of creativity and general academic ability. The school believes that gifted students from disadvantaged backgrounds often do not perform well on standardized tests and has devised this system to better understand their ability.

There are 60-75 competitive spaces for freshman each year.

==== Student body composition ====
60% (Note: The website varies on whether they admit 60% or 60-75% disadvantaged students, but the article assumes 60% based on other figures and the potential that the author got this number confused with the 60-75 spots for incoming freshman every year.) of the spaces for incoming freshmen are designated for students from low socioeconomic backgrounds. The remainder come from middle class backgrounds, with the stated goal of creating a diverse student body. More than 400 students from every middle school in the City apply every year.

=== Education ===
The school was founded on a set of principles by educator Dr. Margaret Dabney in the "Dabney Document," which called upon educators to help their students learn and build on their experiences, rather than merely "teach." The document still guides school practices today. Entrenched practices, such as ranking students by grade, class, and grade-point average, were not seen as critical.

In the spring of each year, the school has a "minimester" where students attend a grade-level specific trip meant to further their education and camaraderie. Freshmen are required to attend their trip, which is a camping trip on the Chesapeake Bay. The trip is funded, and financial aid applications are offered, by the Richmond Community High Advisory Board, a group of alumni.
