= Wendell Dabney =

American journalist

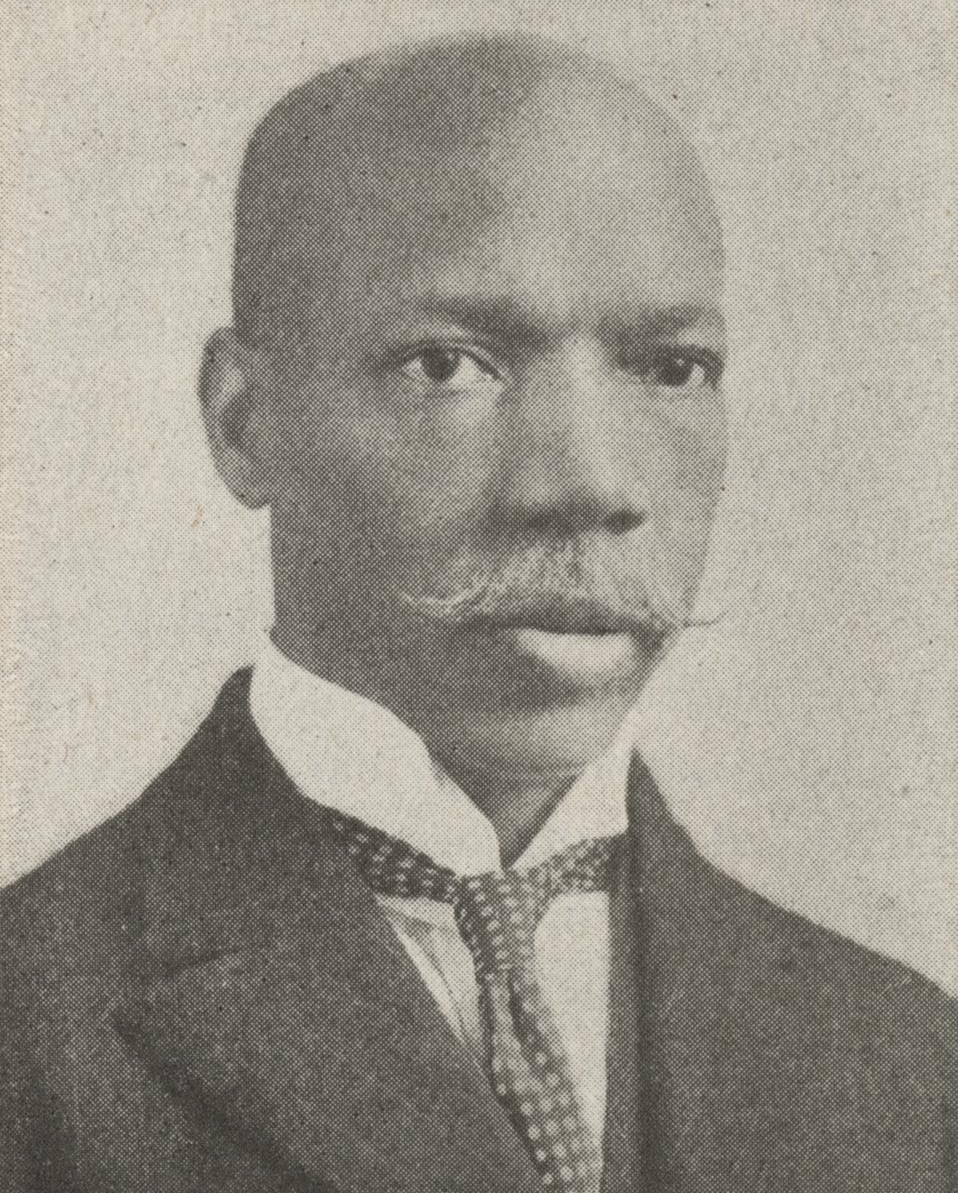
Wendell Phillips Dabney

Wendell Phillips Dabney (November 4, 1865, in Richmond, Virginia – June 3, 1952, in Cincinnati, Ohio) was an influential civil rights organizer, author, and musician as well as a newspaper editor and publisher in Cincinnati, Ohio. He wrote various books and pamphlets including Cincinnati's Colored Citizens.

== Career ==
Dabney was born in Richmond, Virginia, five months after the end of the American Civil War to former slaves John Marchall Dabney (1824–1900) and Elizabeth Foster (maiden; 1834–1907).

=== Formal education ===
Wendell Dabney was a talented musician and graduated from Richmond High School in the first integrated graduation ceremony at Richmond High School. Richmond public schools were segregated, and the graduating black seniors were supposed to hold their ceremony in a church, while white seniors graduated from a theater. The black students protested, managing to force the school to hold an integrated graduation in the school auditorium, although seating was segregated by race. Dabney claimed this was "the first school strike of Negroes in America." Ten seniors graduated from the Richmond Colored Normal School that year, including activist and banker Maggie Walker and educator and businessperson Mary Burrell.

In 1883, Dabney was enrolled in the preparatory department at Oberlin College. While there, he was first violinist at the Oberlin Opera House and was a member of the Cademian Literary Society.

=== Post college career ===
He worked as a waiter and teacher before moving to Boston where he opened a music studio. He taught in Richmond schools from 1886 until 1892.

Dabney traveled to Cincinnati in 1894 and met Nellie Foster Jackson, a widow who had two sons, in Indiana. They married in 1897 and settled in Cincinnati where he opened a music studio, became involved in politics, was city paymaster, became the first president of the local chapter of the NAACP, and started the Ohio Enterprise newspaper in 1902. It eventually became The Union which he published until 1952, the year of his death.

He wrote several books and pamphlets including one about leading African Americans in Cincinnati, a biography of his close friend Maggie L. Walker (the first woman to charter a bank in the U.S.), and published a collection of his newspaper writings. Walker hired Dabney to write her biography. He also composed songs.

He objected to laws restricting marriage between African Americans and whites.

The Dabney Building was at 420 McAllister Street.

== Family ==
Wendell Dabney was an uncle and music teacher of ragtime pianist, songwriter, and composer Ford Dabney (1883–1958).

Wendell Dabney's father, John Marshall Dabney, was, in November 2015, posthumously honored in Richmond, Virginia, at the Quirk Hotel as a famed caterer and bartender – known, among other things, as the world's greatest mint julep-maker. The event was attended by notable community members and one of his great-great-granddaughters, Jennifer Hardy (née Jennifer Dehaven Jackson). Jennifer's mother (great-granddaughter-in-law of John Marshall Dabney), Mary Hinkson (1925–2014), was an internationally celebrated modern dancer.

One of Wendell Dabney's brothers, John Milton Dabney (1867–1967), had been a player in the Negro leagues, including the Cuban Giants. Buck Spottswood, as manager, and J. Milton Dabney as team captain, reorganized, in 1895, the Manhattan Baseball Club of Richmond, Virginia.

Another family member is filmmaker Richard Jackson.

== Selected extant works ==
=== Music ===
- "De Noble Game of Craps" (©1898), words by W.P. Dabney, music by Gussie L. Davis Howley, Haviland and Company, New York; OCLC 1061683700
- "Fall Festival March (©1900), by W.P. Dabney, arranged by James M. Fulton, Rudolph Wurlitzer Company; OCLC 449899086
- "God, Our Father," a prayer" (©1904), words and music by W.P. Dabney, Dabney Publishing Company, Cincinnati; OCLC 54192732
- "If You Must Be Caught" (©1921), words and music by W.P. Dabney, arranged by Artie Matthews, Dabney Publishing Company, Cincinnati (Note: Vol. 16, March 1921, No. 1 (1921), p. 193, "If You Must Be Caught")
- "You Will Miss the Colored Soldier", aka "My Old Sweetheart" (©1921), words and music by W.P. Dabney, Dabney Publishing Company, Cincinnati; OCLC 54192758 (Note: Vol. 16, March 1921, No. 1 (1921), p. 215, "My Old Sweetheart")

=== Books ===
- Standard Mandolin Method (©1895), compiled by James F. Roach and W.P. Dabney, Rudolph Wurlitzer Company; OCLC 36619266
- Dabney's Complete Method of Guitar
- The Wolf and the Lamb (1913), a pamphlet published in response to proposed legislation in Ohio to ban miscegenation; OCLC 47292513
- Maggie L. Walker and the I.O of Saint Luke: The Woman and Her Work (re: Maggie L. Walker and the Independent Order of Saint Luke), Dabney Publishing Company (1920, 1927); OCLC 48521784
- Cincinnati's Colored Citizens: Historical, Sociological and Biographical, Dabney Publishing Company (1926); OCLC 1070883620, 865904811, 1614941
- Chisum's Pilgrimage, and Others republished from his newspaper, The Union, a collection of articles he wrote; OCLC 23793503
