= Barack Obama Elementary School (Richmond, Virginia) =

Formerly Confederate-named elementary school

Coordinates: 37.573719°N 77.435673°W

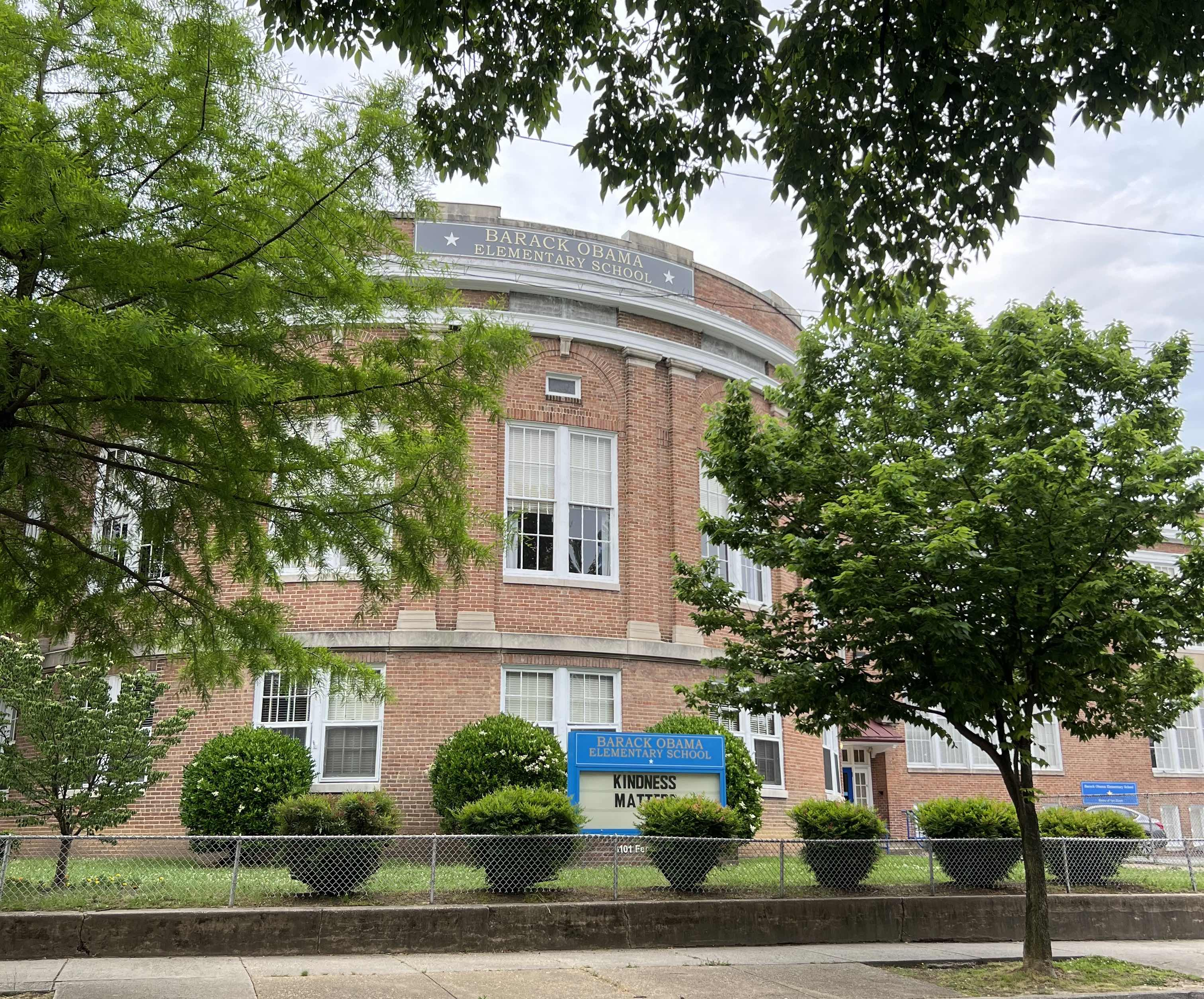
Barack Obama Elementary School in 2024.

Barack Obama Elementary School is an elementary school in Richmond, Virginia, named after the U.S. president Barack Obama.

== Naming ==
The school was formerly named J. E. B Stuart Elementary after the Confederate Army general J. E. B. Stuart; its name was changed in 2018 to remove the historical reference to the Confederacy. The school board voted to rename the school in June 2018.

The renaming of the school is expected to cost $26,000. To help pay for these costs, Richmond Public Schools launched a t-shirt fundraiser and raised $40,894.
