= Richmond High School (Richmond, Virginia) =

School in Virginia, United States

Coordinates: 37.5418°N 77.43382°W

Richmond High School was a former public secondary school in Richmond, Virginia. The school's alumni include prominent African Americans and champion runner Lon Myers, a Jew. An 1885 report on Virginia's schools showed dozens of teachers trained at Richmond High School and the teachers serving in various counties.

== Alumni ==
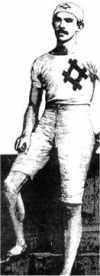
Laurence "Lon" Myers

- Wendell Dabney, who led successful protests of African American students having a separate off campus graduation ceremony
- Irving Comer, Arlington County's first African American policeman
- Lawrence Myers, a champion short-distance runner was in the school's first graduating class
- Lefty Bowers, baseball player
