= Richmond Public Schools =

Public school system of Richmond, Virginia, United States

Richmond City Public Schools
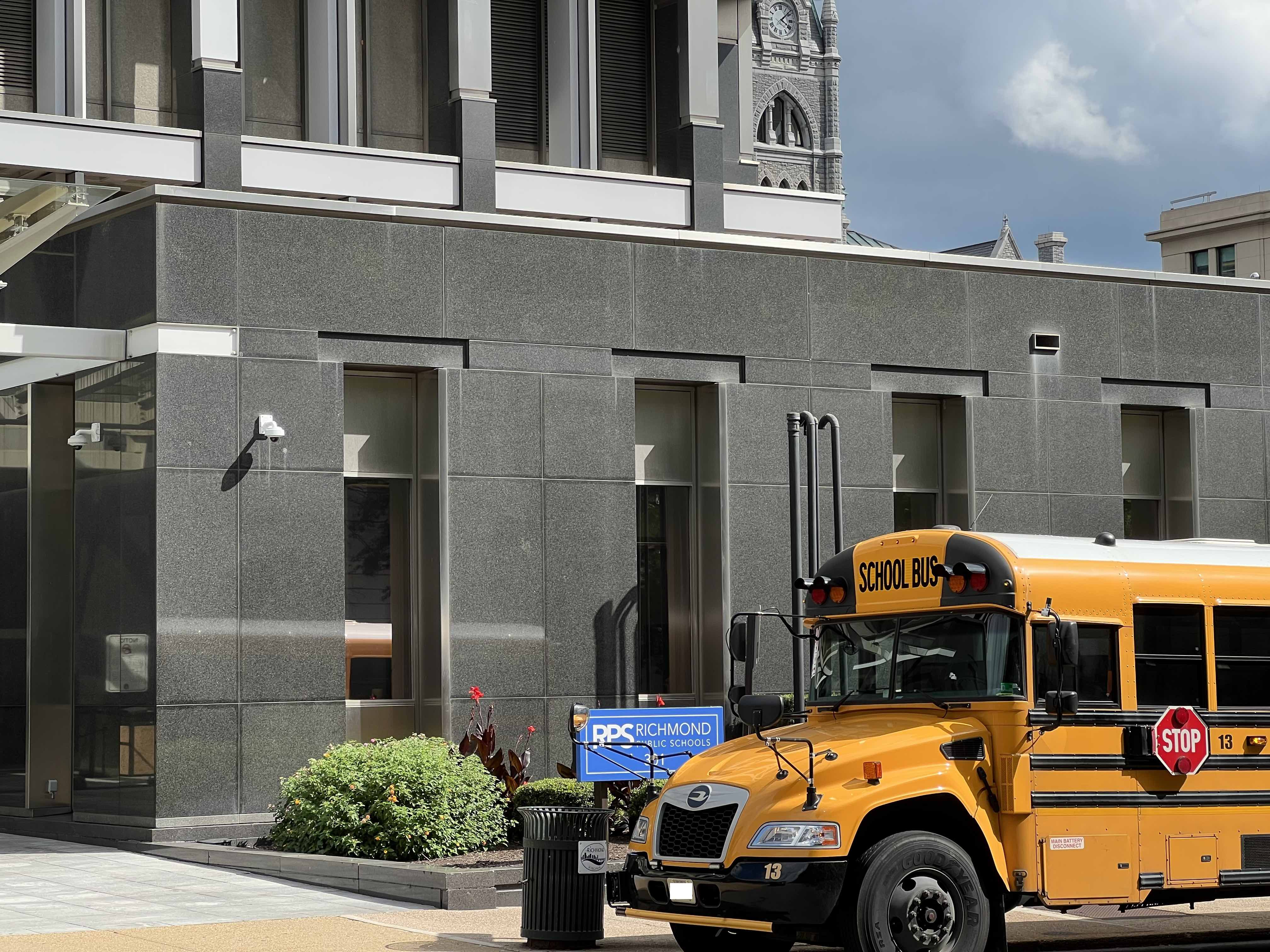
- Richmond Public Schools central office at Richmond City Hall

Address
- 301 North Ninth Street Richmond, Virginia, 23219; United States

District information
- Type: Public
- Grades: PreK–12
- Superintendent: Jason Kamras
- School board: District 1 – Matthew Percival, Vice Chair District 2 – Kathryn Ricard District 3 – Ali Faruk District 4 – Wesley Hedgepeth District 5 – Stephanie Rizzi District 6 – Anne Holton District 7 – Cheryl Burke District 8 – Emmett Jafari District 9 – Shavonda Fernandez, Chair
- Schools: 57
- NCES District ID: 5103240

Students and staff
- Students: 20,962 (2024–2025)
- Teachers: 1,762.80 (on an FTE basis)
- Staff: 2,110.00 (on an FTE basis)
- Student–teacher ratio: 11.89

Other information
- Website: www.rvaschools.net

Richmond Public Schools is a public school district located in the independent city of Richmond, Virginia. It is occasionally described locally as Richmond City Public Schools to emphasize its connection to the independent city rather than the Richmond-Petersburg region at large or the rural Richmond County, Virginia.

== History ==
Richmond did not have public schools during much of the 19th century, only private institutions funded by user fees or charities. From 1906 until 1962, the city of Richmond segregated its public schools by race, and schools serving African American Virginians received less funding and poorer facilities, which led in part to the U.S. Supreme Court's two decisions in Brown v. Board of Education in 1954. Defiance of those decisions by the Commonwealth of Virginia led to the Massive Resistance crisis in the state, which lasted more than a decade. One of the people involved in the eventual peaceful desegregation of Richmond's public schools was Eleanor P. Sheppard, who began her public involvement with the Parent-Teacher Association of her children's school in the Ginter Park neighborhood. In 1954, "Mrs. Sheppard" became the first woman elected to the Richmond City Council, and she became the city's first female mayor in 1962, serving in the Virginia General Assembly for a decade. The Richmond School Board acknowledged the crisis in part by naming an elementary school to honor her and one of the school district's first principals of African American descent, Overby-Sheppard Elementary School.

The Richmond school district partly resolved the Massive Resistance crisis in its jurisdiction by eliminating racial terminology from its official reports in 1962. Another important person in resolving the crisis was Virginia native and Richmond lawyer Lewis F. Powell Jr., who served as Chairman of the Richmond School Board from 1952 until 1961. Powell did not take any part in his law firm's representation of Prince Edward County, Virginia in Davis v. County School Board of Prince Edward County, which became one of the five cases decided under the caption Brown v. Board of Education in 1954. The Richmond School Board also lacked authority at the time to force integration, since beginning in 1958, the state government assumed control over attendance policies. Powell later became president of the American Bar Association and an associate justice of the Supreme Court of the United States.

== Academic struggles and improvements ==
In October 2009, the Richmond Times-Dispatch printed an editorial entitled "Dropping In," briefly outlining a program meant to reduce the number of high school dropouts in Richmond's public school system. In this article it was revealed that Richmond's dropout rate was "hovering around 15 percent". It was also stated on the Richmond Public Schools' website that the four-year-cohort dropout rate was 14.8 percent for the 2005-2009 cohort, declined from its 16.2 percent rate for 2004–2008.

While the percentage is declining, dropout and late graduation rates are still an issue. In October 2009, in a News Release about Richmond Public Schools, it is stated that "the latest data for students in the 2005-2009 cohort indicate that nearly 69 percent (68.7) of Richmond's students graduated on time." This is an increase from the 2004-2008 cohort rate of 65.8 percent, and it is well below the state average of 83.2 percent.

=== Dropout Prevention Initiative ===
While high dropout rates in the school system are a problem, positive action is being taken, as of 2009. On October 21, 2009, the superintendent of Richmond City Public Schools, Yvonne W. Brandon, unveiled a plan called "Dropout Prevention Initiative" (DPI). The objective of this program is to continue to decrease the school system's dropout rate.

There are a few objectives of the DPI. The first is to find high school dropouts and convince them to return to high school to graduate through mentoring programs, Individual Learning Plans (ILP), and partnerships with others in the community. These "others" include higher education institutions, elected officials, as well as faith-based and community-based organizations. One of the most appealing aspects of the DPI is that it requires no additional funding and is solely a redistribution of resources.

There is a district-wide mentoring program as a part of DPI that encourages Richmond Public Schools employees and students to serve as mentors once the recovered students return to school. There are also mentors provided by the higher educational institutions and the faith- and community-based organizations with which the DPI has partnerships.

A unique aspect of this program is that recovery specialists within the DPI literally walk door-to-door to the homes of students who have dropped out to talk with them about and encourage the possibility of returning to school. Students returning to school are assisted by the DPI Intake Counselors, who work with recovered students to help the students re-adjust to being in school and receive an ILP. The ILP is, as stated by the Richmond Public Schools website, "an online educational plan for students that helps pair students' career goals with academic and career and technical courses needed to accomplish their future interests".

The program also recognizes at-risk students and works on preventing student dropouts, rather than only trying to reverse them. Richmond Public Schools has implemented "Extensive Mandatory Professional Development" for staff on how to effectively identify and help at-risk students. There is also a new "Get In – Stay in" media campaign on the radio and television to help encourage attendance among students.

== Administration ==
=== Superintendent ===
The superintendent is Jason Kamras, who was also the 2005 United States National Teacher of the Year.

=== School board members ===
The school district is governed by an elected school board, with one member from each of nine districts. Current Members (2026) are:

1	Matthew Percival, Vice Chair
2	Kathryn Ricard
3	Ali Faruk
4	Wesley Hedgepeth
5	Stephanie Rizzi
6	Anne Holton
7	Cheryl Burke
8	Emmett Jafari
9	Shavonda Fernandez, Chair

== Schools ==
=== High schools ===
Name	Address	Image
Armstrong High School	2300 Cool Lane, Richmond, Virginia 23223	
Huguenot High School	7945 Forest Hill Avenue, Richmond, Virginia 23225	
Thomas Jefferson High School	4100 W. Grace Street, Richmond, Virginia 23230	
John Marshall High School	4225 Old Brook Road, Richmond, Virginia 23227	
Open High School	600 S. Pine Street, Richmond, Virginia 23220	
Richmond Community High School	201 East Brookland Park Boulevard, Richmond, Virginia 23222	
Richmond High School for the Arts	4314 Crutchfield Street, Richmond, Virginia 23225	
Franklin Military Academy	701 North 37th Street, Richmond, VA 23223	

=== Middle schools ===
Name	Address	Image
Albert Hill Middle School	3400 Patterson Avenue, Richmond, Virginia 23221	
Dogwood Middle School	1701 Floyd Avenue, Richmond, Virginia 23220	
Lucille M. Brown Middle School	6300 Jahnke Road, Richmond, Virginia 23225	
Martin Luther King, Jr. Middle School	1000 Mosby Street, Richmond, Virginia 23223	
River City Middle School	6300 Hull Street Road N, Richmond, Virginia 23224	
Thomas C. Boushall Middle School	3400 Hopkins Road, Richmond, Virginia 23234	
Thomas H. Henderson Middle School	4319 Old Brook Road, Richmond, Virginia 23227	
Franklin Military Academy	701 N 37th St, Richmond, Virginia 23223	

=== Elementary schools ===
Name	Address	Image
Barack Obama Elementary School (formerly J. E. B. Stuart Elementary School)	3101 Fendall Avenue, Richmond, Virginia 23222	
Bellevue Elementary School	2301 E Grace Street, Richmond, Virginia 23223	
Broad Rock Elementary School	4615 Ferguson Lane, Richmond, Virginia 23234	
Cardinal Elementary School	1745 Catalina Drive, Richmond, Virginia 23224	
Chimborazo Elementary School	3000 E Marshall Street, Richmond, Virginia 23223	
Elizabeth D. Redd Elementary School	5601 Jahnke Road, Richmond, Virginia 23225	
Fairfield Court Elementary School	2510 Phaup Street, Richmond, Virginia 23223	
Frances W. McClenney Elementary School	3817 Chamberlayne Avenue, Richmond, Virginia 23227	
G.H. Reid Elementary School	1301 Whitehead Road, Richmond, Virginia 23225	
George W. Carver Elementary School	1110 W Leigh Street, Richmond, Virginia 23220	
Henry L. Marsh, III Elementary School	813 N 28th Street, Richmond, Virginia 23223	
J.B. Fisher Elementary School	3701 Garden Road, Richmond, Virginia 23235	
J.H. Blackwell Elementary School	300 E 15th Street, Richmond, Virginia 23224	
J.L. Francis Elementary School	5146 Snead Road, Richmond, Virginia 23224	
Lois Harrison-Jones Elementary School	3021 Maplewood Avenue, Richmond, Virginia 23221	
Linwood Holton Elementary School	1600 W Laburnum Avenue, Richmond, Virginia 23227	
Mary Munford Elementary School (formerly PBS Kids Mary Munford until 2013)	211 Westmoreland Street, Richmond, Virginia 23226	
Miles J. Jones Elementary School	200 Beaufont Hills Drive, Richmond, Virginia 23225	
Oak Grove-Bellemeade Elementary School	2409 Webber Avenue, Richmond, Virginia 23224	
Overby-Sheppard Elementary School	2300 1st Avenue, Richmond, Virginia 23222	
Southampton Elementary School	3333 Cheverly Road, Richmond, Virginia 23225	
Swansboro Elementary School	3160 Midlothian Turnpike, Richmond, Virginia 23224	
Westover Hills Elementary School	1211 Jahnke Road, Richmond, Virginia 23225	
William Fox Elementary School	2300 Hanover Avenue, Richmond, Virginia 23220	
Woodville Elementary School	2000 N 28th Street, Richmond, Virginia 23223	

=== Specialty schools ===
- Amelia Street School
- Franklin Military Academy – first public military school in the nation, serves grades 6-12
- Patrick Henry School of Science and Arts
- Richmond Adult Technical Center
- Richmond Alternative School
- Richmond Career Education and Employment Academy
- Richmond Technical Center
- Richmond Virtual Academy
- Virgie Binford Education Center

Maggie L. Walker Governor's School for Government and International Studies is a regional magnet school to which RPS contributes students, located directly between the Virginia Commonwealth University and Virginia Union University campuses.
