= English National Cross Country Championships =

British Athletics even rider

- Frequency: annual
- Country: England
- Inaugurated: 1876
- Organiser: English Cross Country Association

The English National Cross Country Championships is an annual English cross country running event which takes place in late February following the regional championships (Southern, Midlands and Northern) which all take place on the same weekend usually in late January. The event is the oldest national cross country championship in the world, having been first run in 1876. The English, Welsh and Scottish National Cross Country Championships are all usually held on the same day.

== Format ==
There are categories for senior men and women, junior men and women, U17, U15, U13 and club teams. The course is 12 km for men and 8 km for women and the fact that the distances for senior men and senior women is different has recently been a topic for discussion and review. Following a review of various surveys the English Cross Country Association voted to keep the race distances at 12 km for the senior men and 8 km for the senior women for the 2019 championship.

The event is organised by the English Cross Country Association and currently sponsored by Saucony UK. As well as individual competition, senior athletes represent their athletics club for points scoring and team awards. Club teams consist of six senior men or four senior women.

== Venues ==
The venue for the English National Cross Country Championships is not fixed and is usually hosted in turn by the regional associations. The men's and women's venues were held at different locations until 1995, when both were held at the same venue for the first time.

== History ==
The first championship in 1876 was known as the 'National' and was declared void because all 32 runners went off course. The women's event was first held in 1927. The senior event winners are shown in the table. Up to 1994, the women's event was run separately at a different location from the men's race.

== Past winners ==
=== Men ===
Year	Location (m/w)	Men's senior team	Men's senior individual	Note/Ref
1876	Buckhurst Hill	declared void (32 ran)		
1877	Roehampton	Thames Hare & Hounds	Percy H Stenning (Thames H&H)	
1878	Roehampton	Spartan Harriers	Percy H Stenning (Thames H&H)	
1879	Roehampton	Thames Hare & Hounds	Percy H Stenning (Thames H&H)	
1880	Roehampton	Birchfield Harriers	Percy H Stenning (Thames H&H)	
1881	Roehampton	Moseley Harriers	George A Dunning (Clapton Beagles)	
1882	Roehampton	Moseley Harriers	Walter George (Moseley H)	
1883	Roehampton	Moseley Harriers	George A Dunning (Clapton Beagles)	
1884	Four Oaks, Sutton Coldfield	Moseley Harriers	Walter George (Moseley H)	
1885	Manchester	Liverpool Harriers	William Snook (Birchfield H)	
1886	Croydon	Birchfield Harriers	J E 'Flyer' Hickman (Godiva H)	
1887	Four Oaks, Sutton Coldfield	Birchfield Harriers	J E 'Flyer' Hickman (Godiva H)	
1888	Manchester	Birchfield Harriers	Edward W Parry (Salford H)	
1889	Kempton	Salford Harriers	Edward W Parry (Salford H)	
1890	Sutton Coldfield	Salford Harriers	Edward W Parry (Salford H)	
1891	Prenton, Birkenhead	Birchfield Harriers	James Kibblewhite (Spartan H)	
1892	Ockham	Birchfield Harriers	Herbert A Heath (SLH)	(Note: Tie between Birchfield Harriers and Essex Beagles, in the subsequent run-off Birchfield won by 35 pts to 43 pts)
1893	Redditch	Essex Beagles	Herbert A Heath (SLH)	
1894	Blackpool	Salford Harriers	George Crossland (Salford H)	
1895	Wembley	Birchfield Harriers	Steve Cottrill (Thames Valley H)	
1896	Water Orton	Salford Harriers	George Crossland (Manchester H)	
1897	Trafford Park	Salford H & Manchester H	Sidney Robinson (Northampton & County AC)	(Note: Tie between Salford H and Manchester H)
1898	Horton, Northants	Salford Harriers	Sidney Robinson (Northampton & County AC)	
1899	Wembley	Highgate Harriers	Charles Bennett (Finchley H)	
1900	Rotherham	Finchley Harriers	Charles Bennett (Finchley H)	
1901	Leicester	Essex Beagles	Alfred Shrubb (SLH)	
1902	Lingfield	Highgate Harriers	Alfred Shrubb (SLH)	
1903	Haydock	Birchfield Harriers	Alfred Shrubb (SLH)	
1904	Wolverhampton	Highgate Harriers	Alfred Shrubb (SLH)	
1905	Lingfield	Highgate Harriers	Albert Aldridge (Highgate H)	
1906	Haydock	Sutton H & AC	Charlie J Straw (Sutton H & AC)	
1907	Colwall	Birchfield Harriers	George Pearce (Highgate H)	
1908	Newbury	Hallamshire Harriers	Arthur Robertson (Birchfield H)	
1909	Haydock	Birchfield Harriers	James Murphy (Hallamshire H)	
1910	Derby	Hallamshire Harriers	Fred C Neaves (Surrey AC)	
1911	Taplow	Hallamshire Harriers	Fred N Hibbins (Thrapston H & AC)	
1912	Haydock	Hallamshire Harriers	Fred N Hibbins (Thrapston H & AC)	
1913	Wolverhampton	Birchfield Harriers	Ernest Glover (Hallamshire H)	
1914	Chesham	Surrey AC	Charles Ruffell (Highgate H)	
1915-1919 cancelled due to the World War I
1920	Windsor Great Park	Birchfield Harriers	Charlie Gibbon (Note: race won by Joseph Guillemot (guest))	
1921	Doncaster	Birchfield Harriers	Wally Freeman (Birchfield H)	
1922	Hereford	Birchfield Harriers	Harry Eckersley (Note: race won by Joseph Guillemot (guest))	
1923	Beaconsfield	Birchfield Harriers	Joe Blewitt (Birchfield H)	
1924	Doncaster	Birchfield Harriers	Cpl Bill Cotterell (Royal Corps of Signals)	
1925	Hereford	Birchfield Harriers	Cpl Bill Cotterell (Royal Corps of Signals)	
1926	Wolverton	Birchfield Harriers	Jack Webster (Birchfield H)	
1927	Crewe/Luton	Hallamshire Harriers	Ernie Harper (Hallamshire H)	
1928	Leamington/Chigwell	Birchfield Harriers	Jack Webster (Birchfield H)	
1929	Beaconsfield/Perivale	Birchfield Harriers	Ernie Harper (Hallamshire H)	
1930	Sheffield/Wolverton	Birchfield Harriers	Wally B Howard (Kettering Town H)	
1931	Kettering/Epsom	Birchfield Harriers	Jack Potts (Saltwell H)	
1932	Wolverton/Coventry	Birchfield Harriers	Alec Burns (Elswick H)	
1933	Alderley Edge/Warwick	Birchfield Harriers	Tom Evenson (Salford H)	
1934	Dudley/Kettering	Birchfield Harriers	Sam Dodd (Wirral AC)	
1935	Beaconsfield/Longbridge	Belgrave Harriers	Frank Close (Reading AC)	
1936	Alderley Edge/Chidwell Row	Birchfield Harriers	Jack Potts (Saltwell H)	
1937	Stratford-upon-Avon/Perry Barr	Birchfield Harriers	Herbert D Clark (York H)	
1938	Reading/Luton	Mitcham AC	Jack Holden (Tipton H)	
1939	Worsley/Rugby	Belgrave Harriers	Jack Holden (Tipton H)	
1940-1945 cancelled due to the World War II
1946	Leamington Spa/Cheltenham	Belgrave Harriers	Jack Holden (Tipton H)	
1947	Apsley/Oxford	Sutton Harriers	Archie A Robertson (Reading AC)	
1948	Sheffield/Sutton Coldfield	Belgrave Harriers	Sydney Wooderson (Blackheath H)	
1949	Birmingham/Worsley	Sutton Harriers	Frank E. Aaron (Leeds St Marks AC)	
1950	Aylesbury/Parliament Hill	Sutton Harriers	Frank E. Aaron (Leeds St Marks AC)	
1951	Richmond/Tadcaster	Sutton H	Frank E. Aaron (Leeds St Marks AC)	
1952	Great Barr/Perry Barr	Victoria Park AAC	Walter Hesketh (Manchester A & CC)	
1953	Reading/Birmingham	Birchfield Harriers	Gordon Pirie (SLH)	
1954	Birkenhead/Aylesbury	Bolton United H & AC	Gordon Pirie (SLH)	
1955	Bedford/Leeds	South London Harriers	Gordon Pirie (SLH)	
1956	Warwick/Sutton Coldfield	Sheffield United H & AC	Ken Norris (Thames Valley H)	
1957	Parliament Hill/Enfield	South London Harriers	Frank Sando (Aylesford PMSC)	
1958	Birkenhead/Winton	South London Harriers	Alan F Perkins (Ilford AC)	
1959	Peterborough/Birmingham	Sheffield United H & AC	Frederick Norris (Bolton United H & AC)	
1960	West Bromwich/Morden Park	Derby & County AC	Basil Heatley (Coventry Godiva)	
1961	Parliament Hill/Sheffield	Derby & County AC	Basil Heatley (Coventry Godiva))	
1962	Blackpool/Wolverhampton	Derby & County AC	Gerry North (Blackpool & Fylde AC)	
1963	Cambridge/Richmond Park	Coventry Godiva	Basil Heatley (Coventry Godiva)	
1964	Leicester/Bury	Portsmouth AC	Mel Batty (Thurrock H)	
1965	Parliament Hill/Birmingham	Portsmouth AC	Mel Batty (Thurrock H)	
1966	Sheffield/Watford	North Staffs & Stone HAC	Ron Hill (Bolton United H & AC)	
1967	Norwich/Blackburn	Portsmouth AC	Dick Taylor (Coventry Godiva)	
1968	Sutton Coldfield/Coventry	Coventry Godiva	Ron Hill (Bolton United H & AC)	
1969	Parliament Hill/Aldershot	Tipton Harriers	Mike Tagg (Norfolk Gazelles)	
1970	Blackpool/Blackburn	City of Stoke AC	Trevor Wright (Hallamshire H)	
1971	Norwich/Wolverhampton	Shettleston Harriers	Dave Bedford (Shaftesbury H)	
1972	Sutton Coldfield/High Wycombe	Tipton Harriers	Malcolm Thomas (Thames Valley H)	
1973	Parliament Hill/Rawtenstall	Gateshead Harriers	Dave Bedford (Shaftesbury H)	
1974	Sheffield/Leicester	Derby & County AC	Dave Black (Small Heath H)	
1975	Stopsley/Parliament Hill	Gateshead Harriers	Anthony Simmons (Luton United AC)	
1976	Leicester/Blackburn	Gateshead Harriers	Bernie Ford (AFD)	
1977	Parliament Hill/Stoke	Gateshead Harriers	Brendan Foster (Gateshead H)	
1978	Leeds/High Wycombe	Tipton Harriers	Bernie Ford (AFD)	
1979	Stopsley/Runcorn	Gateshead Harriers	Mike McLeod (Elswick H)	
1980	Leicester/Rugeley	Tipton Harriers	Nick Rose (Bristol AC)	
1981	Parliament Hill/Colchester	Tipton Harriers	Julian Goater (Shaftesbury H)	
1982	Leeds/Carlisle	Tipton Harriers	Dave Clarke (Hercules Wimbledon AC)	
1983	Stopsley/Warwick	AFD	Tim Hutchings (Crawley AC)	
1984	Newark/Knebworth	AFD	Eamonn Martin (Basildon AC)	
1985	Milton Keynes/Birkenhead	AFD	Dave Lewis (Rossendale H & AC)	
1986	Newcastle/Leicester	Tipton Harriers	Tim Hutchings (Crawley AC)	
1987	Stopsley/Bexley	Gateshead Harriers	Dave Clarke (Hercules Wimbledon AC)	
1988	Newark/Leeds	Birchfield Harriers	Dave Clarke (Hercules Wimbledon AC)	
1989	Epsom/Birmingham	Tipton Harriers	Dave Lewis (Rossendale H & AC)	
1990	Leeds/Rickmansworth	Valli Harriers	Richard Nerurkar (Bingley H & AC)	
1991	Luton/Birkenhead	Bingley H & AC	Richard Nerurkar (Bingley H & AC)	
1992	Newark/Cheltenham	Tipton Harriers	Eamonn Martin (Basildon AC)	
1993	Parliament Hill/Luton	Bingley H & AC	Richard Nerurkar (Bingley H & AC)	
1994	South Shields/Blackburn	Blackheath Harriers	Dave Lewis (Rossendale H & AC)	
1995	Luton	Blackheath Harriers	Spencer Duval (Cannock & Stafford A)	
1996	Newark	Bingley H & AC	John Nuttall (Preston H & AC)	
1997	Havant	Tipton Harriers	Steffan White (Coventry Godiva)	
1998	Leeds	Bingley H & AC	Dominic Bannister (Shaftesbury Barnet H)	
1999	Newark	Tipton Harriers	Justin Pugsley (Birchfield H)	
2000	Stowe	Tipton Harriers	Glynn Tromans (Coventry Godiva)	
2001	Durham	Bingley H & AC	Mike Openshaw (Birchfield H)	
2002	Bristol	Bingley H & AC	Sam Haughian (WSEH)	
2003	Parliament Hill	Leeds City AC	Matt Smith (Tipton H)	
2004	Leeds	Belgrave Harriers	Glynn Tromans (Coventry Godiva)	
2005	Birmingham	Salford H & AC	Glynn Tromans (Coventry Godiva)	
2006	Parliament Hill	Leeds City AC	Peter Riley (Leigh H & AC)	
2007	Sunderland	Leeds City AC	Frank Tickner (Wells City H)	
2008	Alton Towers	Leeds City AC	Tom Humphries (Cannock & Stafford AC)	
2009	Parliament Hill	Newham & Essex Beagles	Frank Tickner (Wells City Harriers])	
2010	Leeds	AFD	Andy Vernon (AFD)	
2011	Alton Towers	Leeds City AC	Steve Vernon (Stockport Harriers & AC)	
2012	Parliament Hill	Leeds City AC	Keith Gerrard (Newham & Essex Beagles)	
2013	Sunderland	Morpeth Harriers & AC	Keith Gerrard (Newham & Essex Beagles)	
2014	Nottingham	Bedford & County AC	Steve Vernon (Stockport Harriers & AC)	
2015	Parliament Hill	Notts AC	Charlie Hulson (Sale H)	
2016	Donington Park	Morpeth Harriers & AC	Jonathan Hay (AFD)	
2017	Nottingham	Tonbridge AC	Ben Connor (Derby AC)	
2018	Parliament Hill	Tonbridge AC	Adam Hickey (Southend-on-Sea AC)	
2019	Harewood House, Leeds	Leeds City AC	Mahamed Mahamed (Southampton AC)	
2020	Nottingham	Tonbridge AC	Calum Johnson (Gateshead H)	
2021 cancelled due to the COVID-19 pandemic
2022	Parliament Hill	Southampton AC	Mahamed Mahamed (Southampton AC)	
2023	Bolesworth Castle	Leeds City AC	James Kingston (Tonbridge AC)	
2024	Weston Park	Bristol & West AC	Hugo Milner (Derby AC)	
2025	Parliament Hill	Bristol & West AC	Richard Slade (Chiltern Harriers AC)	
2026	East Hardwick Park	Bristol & West AC	Hugo Milner (Derby AC)	

=== Women ===
Year	Location (m/w)	Women's senior team	Women's senior individual	Note/Ref
1927	Crewe/Luton	Middlesex Ladies	Anne M A Williams (Littlehampton Ladies)	
1928	Leamington/Chigwell	Middlesex Ladies	Lilian D Styles (Littlehampton Ladies)	
1929	Beaconsfield/Perivale	Middlesex Ladies	Lilian D Styles (Littlehampton Ladies)	
1930	Sheffield/Wolverton	Westbury Harriers	Lilian D Styles (Littlehampton Ladies)	
1931	Kettering/Epsom	London Olympiades AC	Gladys Lunn (Birchfield H)	
1932	Wolverton/Coventry	Birchfield Harriers	Gladys Lunn (Birchfield H)	
1933	Alderley Edge/Warwick	Airedale Harriers	Lilian D Styles (Haywards Heath Ladies AC)	
1934	Dudley/Kettering	London Olympiades AC	Lilian D Styles (London Olympiades AC)	
1935	Beaconsfield/Longbridge	London Olympiades AC	Nellie Halstead (Radcliffe H & AC)	
1936	Alderley Edge/Chidwell Row	Small Heath Harriers	Nellie Halstead (Radcliffe H & AC)	
1937	Stratford-upon-Avon/Perry Barr	Birchfield Harriers	Lilian D Styles (London Olympiades AC)	
1938	Reading/Luton	Birchfield Harriers	Evelyne Forster (Civil Service AC)	
1939	Worsley/Rugby	Birchfield Harriers	Evelyne Forster (Civil Service AC)	
1940-1945 cancelled due to the World War II
1946	Leamington Spa/Cheltenham	Birchfield Harriers	Pat Sandall (Birchfield H)	
1947	Apsley/Oxford	Birchfield Harriers	Ruby M Wright (St Gregorys Ladies AC)	
1948	Sheffield/Sutton Coldfield	Birchfield Harriers	Ivy Kibler (Birchfield H)	
1949	Birmingham/Worsley	Birchfield Harriers	E Johnson (Airedale H)	
1950	Aylesbury/Parliament Hill	Birchfield Harriers	Avery Gibson (North Shields Poly Ladies AC)	
1951	Richmond/Tadcaster	Ilford AC	Phyllis Green (Ilford AC)	
1952	Great Barr/Perry Barr	Ilford AC	Phyllis Green (Ilford AC)	
1953	Reading/Birmingham	Birchfield Harriers	Diane Leather (Birchfield H)	
1954	Birkenhead/Aylesbury	Birchfield Harriers	Diane Leather (Birchfield H)	
1955	Bedford/Leeds	Ilford AC	Diane Leather (Birchfield H)	
1956	Warwick/Sutton Coldfield	Ilford AC	Diane Leather (Birchfield H)	
1957	Parliament Hill/Enfield	Ilford AC	June Bridgland (Southampton AC)	
1958	Birkenhead/Winton	Highgate Harriers	Roma Ashby (Coventry Godiva)	
1959	Peterborough/Birmingham	London Olympiades AC	Joyce Byatt (Hampstead Heath H)	
1960	West Bromwich/Morden Park	Ilford AC	Joyce Byatt (Hampstead Heath H)	
1961	Parliament Hill/Sheffield	London Olympiades AC	Roma Ashby (Coventry Godiva)	
1962	Blackpool/Wolverhampton	London Olympiades AC	Roma Ashby (Coventry Godiva)	
1963	Cambridge/Richmond Park	Mitcham AC	Madeleine C Ibbotson (Longwood Ladies)	
1964	Leicester/Bury	Bury & Radcliffe AC	Madeleine C Ibbotson (Longwood Ladies)	
1965	Parliament Hill/Birmingham	Maryhill Ladies AC	Pamela Davies (Selsonia AC)	
1966	Sheffield/Watford	Maryhill Ladies AC	Pamela Davies (Selsonia AC)	
1967	Norwich/Blackburn	Barnet & District AC	Pamela Davies (Selsonia AC)	
1968	Sutton Coldfield/Coventry	Cambridge Harriers	Pamela Davies (Selsonia AC)	
1969	Parliament Hill/Aldershot	Barnet & District AC	Rita Lincoln (Essex Ladies AC)	
1970	Blackpool/Blackburn	Cambridge Harriers	Rita Lincoln (Essex Ladies AC)	
1971	Norwich/Wolverhampton	Coventry Godiva	Rita Lincoln (Essex Ladies AC)	
1972	Sutton Coldfield/High Wycombe	Cambridge Harriers	Rita Lincoln (Essex Ladies AC)	
1973	Parliament Hill/Rawtenstall	Cambridge Harriers	Joyce Smith (Barnet Ladies AC)	
1974	Sheffield/Leicester	Barnet & District AC	Rita Ridley (Essex Ladies AC)	
1975	Stopsley/Parliament Hill	Cambridge Harriers	Christine Tranter (Stretford AC)	(Note: Guest D Nagle (Guinness AC) 1st)
1976	Leicester/Blackburn	London Olympiades AC	Ann Ford (Hounslow AC)	
1977	Parliament Hill/Stoke	Sale Harriers	Glynis Penny (Cambridge H)	
1978	Leeds/High Wycombe	Sale Harriers	Mary Stewart (Birchfield H)	
1979	Stopsley/Runcorn	AFD	Kathryn Binns (Sale H)	
1980	Leicester/Rugeley	Birchfield Harriers	Ruth Smeeth (AFD)	
1981	Parliament Hill/Colchester	Sale Harriers	Wendy Smith (Hounslow AC)	
1982	Leeds/Carlisle	Sale Harriers	Paula Fudge (Hounslow AC)	
1983	Stopsley/Warwick	Sale Harriers	Christine Benning (Southampton AC)	
1984	Newark/Knebworth	AFD	Jane Furniss [Shields] (Sheffield AC)	
1985	Milton Keynes/Birkenhead	Crawley AC	Angela Tooby (Cardiff AC)	
1986	Newcastle/Leicester	Sale Harriers	Carole Bradford (Clevedon AC)	
1987	Stopsley/Bexley	Sale Harriers	Jane Shields (Sheffield AC)	
1988	Newark/Leeds	Birchfield Harriers	Helen Titterington (Leicester Coritanian)	
1989	Epsom/Birmingham	Parkside Harrow AC	Angie Pain (Leeds City AC)	
1990	Leeds/Rickmansworth	Parkside Harrow AC	Andrea Whitcombe (Parkside Harrow)	
1991	Luton/Birkenhead	Parkside Harrow AC	Andrea Whitcombe (Parkside Harrow)	
1992	Newark/Cheltenham	Parkside Harrow AC	Lisa York (Leicester Coritanian)	
1993	Parliament Hill/Luton	Parkside Harrow AC	Gillian Stacey (Bromley Ladies AC)	
1994	South Shields/Blackburn	Parkside Harrow AC	Paula Radcliffe (Bedford & County AC)	
1995	Luton	Parkside Harrow AC	Katy McCandless (Parkside Harrow) AC)	
1996	Newark	Parkside Harrow AC	Alison Wyeth (Parkside Harrow)	(Note: Nnenna Lynch (Oxford University AC) 1st – disqualified non-registered foreign athlete)
1997	Havant	Leeds City AC	Andrea Whitcombe (Parkside Harrow)	
1998	Leeds	Shaftesbury Barnet Harriers	Mara Myers (Parkside Harrow)	
1999	Newark	Shaftesbury Barnet Harriers	Angela Newport (Basingstoke & Mid Hants)	
2000	Stowe	Shaftesbury Barnet Harriers	Tara Kryzwicki (Charnwood AC)	
2001	Durham	Sale Harriers	Liz Yelling (Bedford & County AC)	
2002	Bristol	Shaftesbury Barnet Harriers	Liz Yelling (Bedford & County AC)	
2003	Parliament Hill	Chester-le-Street & District AC	Hayley Yelling (WSEH)	
2004	Leeds	Bristol AC	Birhan Dagne (Belgrave H])	
2005	Birmingham	Bristol & West AC	Hayley Yelling (WSEWH)	
2006	Parliament Hill	Charnwood AC	Elizabeth Hall (Herts Phoenix)	
2007	Sunderland	Winchester & District AC	Liz Yelling (Bedford & County)	
2008	Alton Towers	Winchester & District AC	Liz Yelling (Bedford & County)	
2009	Parliament Hill	Charnwood AC	Hatti Dean (Hallamshire H)	
2010	Leeds	Charnwood AC	Stephanie Twell (AFD)	
2011	Alton Towers	Charnwood AC	Louise Damen (Winchester & District)	
2012	Parliament Hill	Hallamshire Harriers	Gemma Steel (Charnwood AC)	
2013	Sunderland	AFD	Louise Damen (Winchester & District)	
2014	Nottingham	AFD	Gemma Steel (Charnwood AC)	
2015	Parliament Hill	AFD	Lily Partridge (AFD)	
2016	Donington Park	AFD	Lily Partridge (AFD)	
2017	Nottingham	AFD	Jessica Judd (Chelmsford AC)	
2018	Parliament Hill	Sale Harriers	Phoebe Law (Kingston & Poly AC)	
2019	Harewood House, Leeds	Leeds City AC	Emily Hosker Thornhill (AFD)	
2020	Nottingham	AFD	Anna Moller (AFD)	
2021 cancelled due to the COVID-19 pandemic
2022	Parliament Hill	Leeds City AC	Jessica Gibbon (Reading AC)	
2023	Bolesworth Castle	Charnwood AC	Sarah Astin (Belgrave Harriers)	
2024	Weston Park	AFD	Niamh Brown (AFD)	
2025	Parliament Hill	Leeds City AC	Jessica Gibbon (Reading AC)	
2026	East Hardwick Park	Herne Hill Harriers	Lucy Jones (Herne Hill Harriers)	
