= Emelia Gorecka =

British long-distance runner (born 1994)

Emelia Górecka
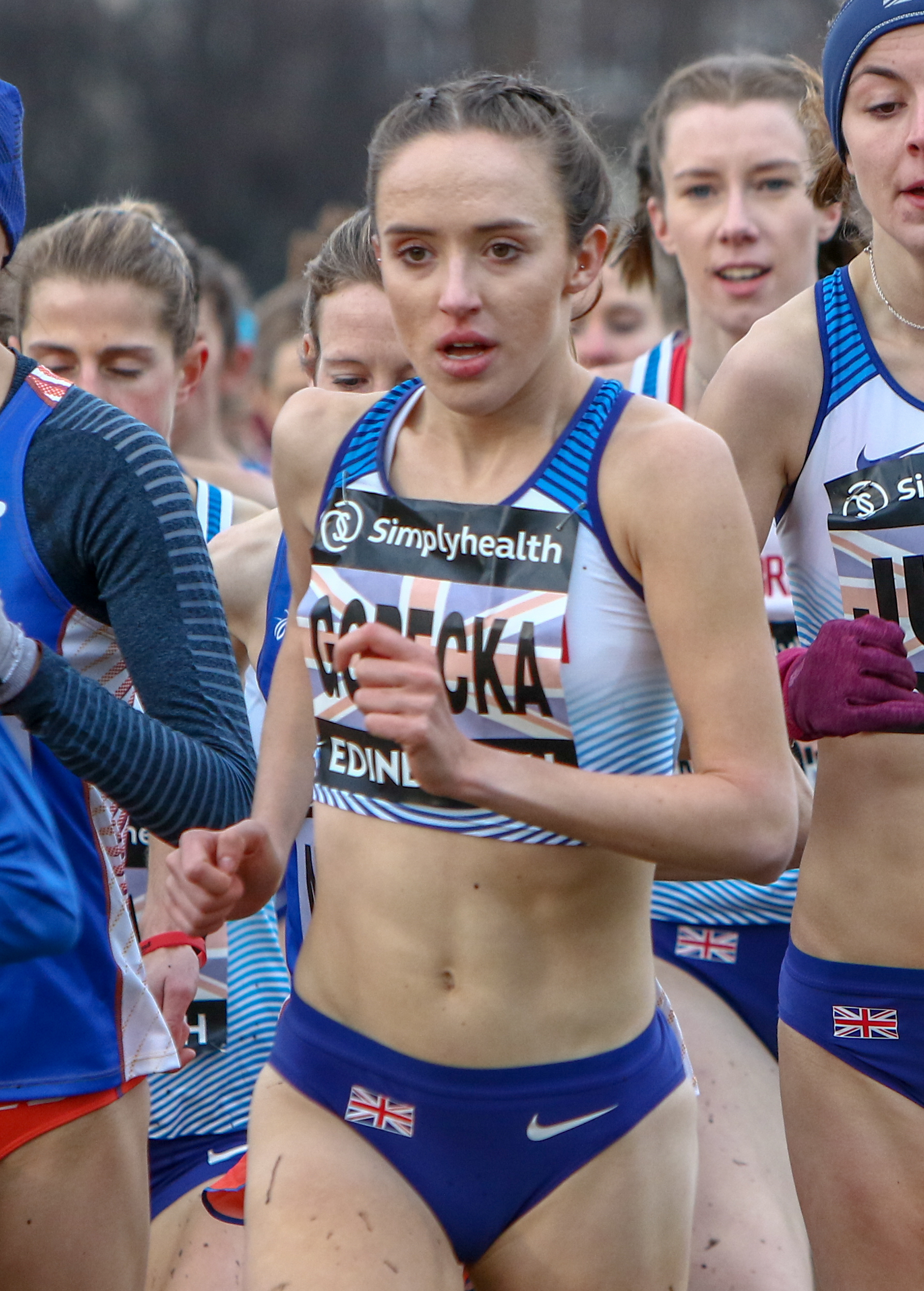
- Gorecka in 2018

Personal information
- Full name: Emelia Jane Gorecka
- Born: 29 January 1994 (age 32) Epsom, Surrey, England
- Height: 1.69 m (5 ft 6 1/2 in)
- Weight: 53 kg (117 lb; 8.3 st)

Sport
- Country: Great Britain
- Club: Aldershot, Farnham & District AC
- Coached by: Mick Woods 2006-2015 Chris Thompson 2016-present

Achievements and titles
- Personal best(s): 1500 m: 4:14.22 (Watford 2012); 3000 m: 8:55.11 (Birmingham 2012); 5000 m:15:34.21 (Watford 2012)
Medal record
Women's athletics
Representing Great Britain
World Cross Country Championships
Bronze medal – third place	2013 Bydgoszcz	Junior Team
World Junior Championships
Bronze medal – third place	2012 Barcelona	3000 m
World Gymniasiade
Gold medal – first place	2009 Doha	3000 m
European Cross Country Championships
Gold medal – first place	2010 Albufeira	Junior Team
Gold medal – first place	2011 Velenje	Junior Individual
Gold medal – first place	2011 Velenje	Junior Team
Gold medal – first place	2012 Budapest	Junior Team
Gold medal – first place	2013 Belgrade	Junior Individual
Gold medal – first place	2013 Belgrade	Junior Team
Silver medal – second place	2012 Budapest	Junior Individual
Silver medal – second place	2014 Samokov	U23 Team
Bronze medal – third place	2010 Albufeira	Junior Individual
European Junior Championships
Gold medal – first place	2013 Rieti	3000 m
Silver medal – second place	2011 Tallinn	5000 m

Emelia Jane Gorecka (born 29 January 1994), is a British middle- and long-distance runner, racing in the 1500 metres, 3000 metres, 5000 metres and 10,000 metres as well as cross country courses. She was the 3000m 2012 World Junior Championships bronze medalist and 2013 European Junior champion. Gorecka won also two individual European junior cross-country titles (2011, 2013).

== Early life and education ==
Gorecka attended Howard of Effingham School. She studied Psychology at Royal Holloway, University of London, graduating in 2016.

== Career ==
Gorecka began her athletics career with Dorking and Mole Valley Athletic Club, where even as an 11-year-old she showed much early promise, beating girls several years older than her in local races. In 2006, she moved to her current club, Aldershot, Farnham and District Athletic Club. She lives in Bookham, Surrey. After winning a number of youth titles at the national level, Górecka had her first international success at the 2010 European Cross Country Championships, where she won a bronze medal in the Junior race. She was also the best European Junior at the World Cross Country Championships that year. In the 2011 European Cross Country Championships she won the junior women's race and led Britain to victory in the team event.

At the age of 14 she topped the UK rankings chart in the 1500m for the U15 age group, in what was the third fastest ever time for someone her age. By the time she was 16 years old she had won a total of 20 national and seven international races and taken part in three World Championship events. Górecka holds the British record time for the mile race as an U15 Girl, 4:46.87, which beat the previous record by four seconds. She also holds the record for 3000m in the U15/U17 age groups.

On 8 December 2013, Górecka came 1st at the European Cross Country Championships in Belgrade, Serbia with a comfortable win over Polish athlete, Sofia Ennaoui with a time of 13:06. The race was on BBC 2 and was televised in 11 other countries.

Górecka came 3rd in her senior debut at the Great Edinburgh Cross Country on 11 January 2014, helping team GB & NI win the International team challenge. The three-time European junior cross-country champion followed Great Britain women's captain Gemma Steel for much of the race, before slipping to third place on the final lap. Afterwards, she said "There was definitely no fear... I didn’t really know what to expect; I knew I was in good shape but I just wanted to be taken around [the course] by the girls. I didn’t expect to get in the front but I felt good... the last lap was a bit of a struggle but my strength will hopefully come on in the next couple of years. It’s good platform to build on, coming third, so I’m really happy." And Górecka also said she wants one last victory as a junior before concentrating on moving up to the adult ranks: “I’m still a junior for the national cross-country, so I’d love to go there to get my eighth consecutive win... then I will go on to do some senior races, maybe some indoors, and then onto the track, but hopefully I will keep going quicker.”

== Scoliosis ==
During her first year with Aldershot, Farnham & District AC that she was diagnosed with scoliosis – a medical condition which means that she had a curvature of the spine. This made some of her basic movements difficult including swinging her arms freely. In Górecka's case, the scoliosis is a genetic condition and is not related to running. Górecka said "This diagnosis initially meant nothing to me – it was unnoticeable and it didn't seem to affect me in the slightest".

However, in 2008 she discovered that her condition had declined and that she was now had two curves of 27 and 34 degrees, displayed as a rather distorted 'S' shape on the x-ray. Her consultant told her that she would have to wear a body brace to support her back as she completed her adolescent growth spurt. She was also told that she might not be able to spend enough time out of the brace each week to continue training. She said "This was the first time in my life where I was struck silent. In that split second I decided I would never let anyone tell me that there was anything that was out of my reach". She was ultimately able to remove the brace for 10 hours each week to train and race.
