= Jonathan Hay (runner) =

British runner

Jonathan "Jonny" Hay
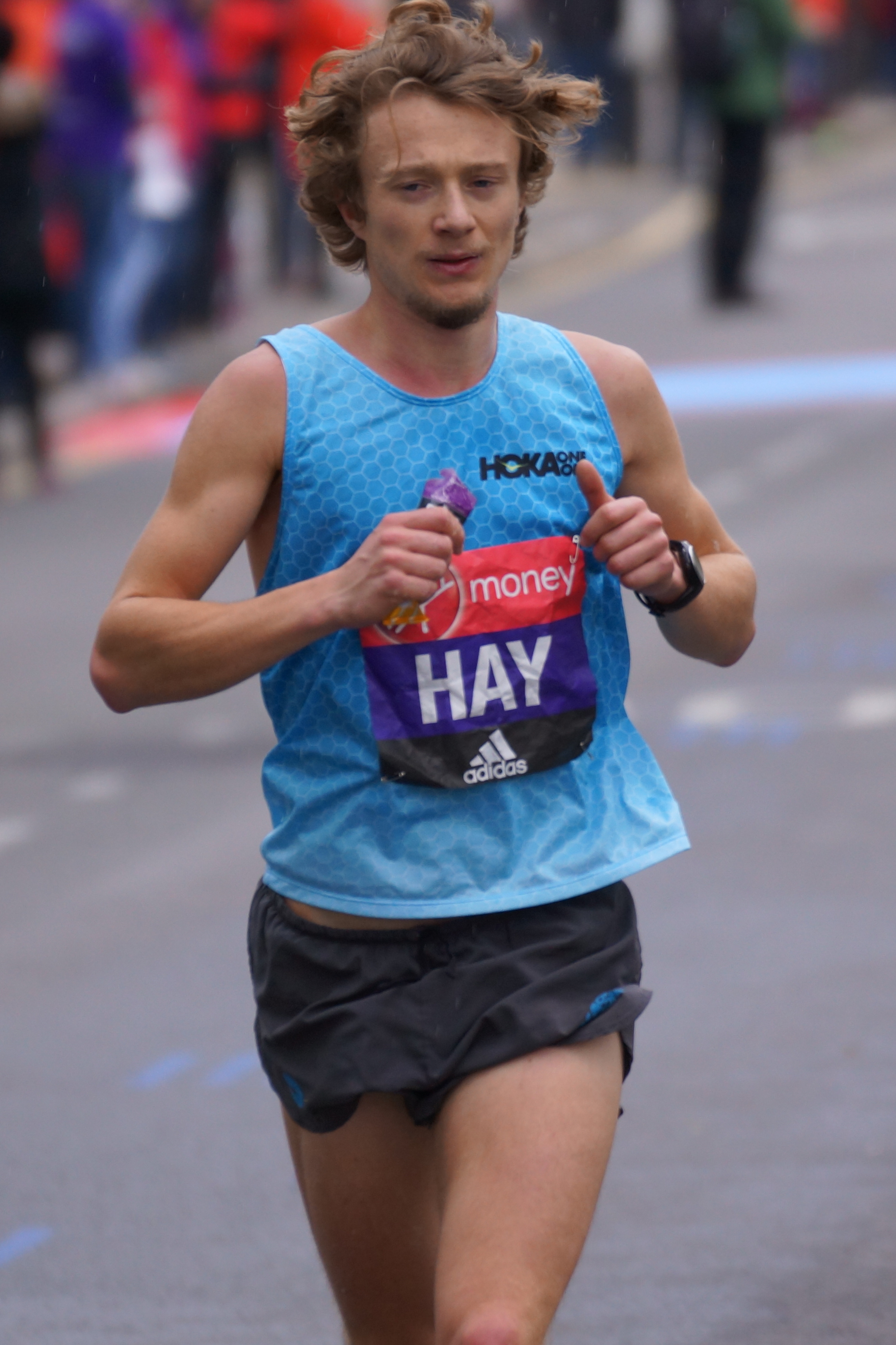
- Hay in 2016

Personal information
- Born: 12 February 1992 (age 34)

Sport
- Country: Great Britain; England
- Club: Aldershot, Farnham & District
- Coached by: Mick Woods 2002-present

Achievements and titles
- Personal best: 400m: 50.80 800m: 1:49.97 1500m: 3:42.13 Mile: 4:09.09 3000m: 7:59.20i 5000m: 13:57.16 10000m: 30:29.07 Half Marathon: 64:09 Marathon: 2:23:52
- Updated on 03 October 2016

Jonathan "Jonny" Hay (born 12 February 1992) is a British middle- and long-distance runner who competes in cross country, track and half marathons.

He was the bronze medallist in the 5000 m at the 2011 European Athletics Junior Championships. He is a three-time participant at the IAAF World Cross Country Championships and has won age category team medals at the European Cross Country Championships.

He is currently sponsored by running shoe company, Hoka One One and is coached by Mick Woods.

== Career ==
=== Early life and junior career ===
Hay started taking part in running competitions at an early age and competed for Aldershot, Farnham and District Athletics Club in 2003. He initially focused on middle-distance events and cross country. By the end of 2008 he had won the Surrey cross country title and the 3000 metres titles at the UK School Games and the English Schools Championships. Hay trained under the tutelage of Mick Woods, a former British international runner.

Hay made his international debut for Great Britain in the 2009 season, starting with an appearance at the 2009 IAAF World Cross Country Championships in the junior race. He ran in the 1500 metres at the 2009 World Youth Championships in Athletics, being eliminated in the heats. At the end of the year he came 23rd in the junior race at the 2009 European Cross Country Championships. On the circuit he placed third in the junior 3000 m at the Aviva London Grand Prix and won the Gateshead leg of the UK Cross Challenge series. He returned to the cross country internationals the following year, improving to 62nd at the World Cross and 14th at the European Cross. That same year, he made his debut in road running at the Guernsey Easter Running Festival, winning the 10K run and coming runner-up in the half marathon.

Hay represented his club at the European Champion Clubs Cup Cross Country in February 2011 and placed 28th for the team. He claimed his first senior national title at the England Cross Country Championships two weeks later. This preceded his best outing yet at the 2011 IAAF World Cross Country Championships, where he placed 39th in the junior section. At the national junior trials he won both the 1500 m and 5000 metres. He was selected for the latter event at the 2011 European Athletics Junior Championships and took the bronze medal in a close finish. After winning the British junior trial event, he went on to place eighth at the 2011 European Cross Country Championships, helping Britain to the team junior gold medals alongside individual medallist Richard Goodman.

=== Under-23 competitions ===
He started the 2012 season with his first senior level success against international competition: he was runner-up to Asbel Kiprop at the Great Edinburgh Cross Country, defeating Olympic medallists Eliud Kipchoge and Kenenisa Bekele in the process. He started studying chemistry at the University of Birmingham and proved himself in student competition with a win at the BUCS Cross Country. He retained his English cross country title shortly after. Hay was the winner of the 1500 m at the UK under-23 Championships, but a week later he didn't make it past the heats of that event at the British Olympic Trials for the 2012 London Olympics. He took to the roads at the end of the year instead, coming third at the Great Yorkshire Run and 16th at the Great North Run.

Hay mainly competed in British Milers Club meetings in 2013, although he did manage sixth in the 5000 m at that year's British Athletics Championships as well as twelfth place and team gold in the under-23 section of the 2013 European Cross Country Championships. He struggled to transition into the senior ranks on the track the following year, coming 15th nationally in the 5000 m despite winning the British under-23 title. He placed within the top ten at the Great North Run. He returned to the European Under-23 Cross Country race and managed fourth place – Britain's best performer – and led the British to the team silver medals behind Russia.

== National titles ==
- English Cross Country Championships Junior: 2011, 2012
- English Cross Country Championships Senior: 2016

== International competitions ==
Year	Competition	Venue	Position	Event	Notes
2009	IAAF World Cross Country Championships	Amman, Jordan	90th	Junior race	
2009	World Youth Championships	Bressanone, Italy	7th (heats)	3000 m	
2009	European Cross Country Championships	Dublin, Ireland	23rd	Junior race	
2010	IAAF World Cross Country Championships	Bydgoszcz, Poland	62nd	Junior race	
2010	European Cross Country Championships	Albufeira, Portugal	14th	Junior race	
2011	IAAF World Cross Country Championships	Punta Umbría, Spain	39th	Junior race	
2011	European Junior Championships	Tallinn, Estonia	3rd	5000 m	
2011	European Cross Country Championships	Velenje, Slovenia	8th	Junior race	
2013	European Cross Country Championships	Belgrade, Serbia	12th	Under-23 race	
2014	European Cross Country Championships	Samokov, Bulgaria	4th	Under-23 race	
2015	IAAF World Cross Country Championships	Guiyang, China	84th	Senior race	
2015	European Cross Country Championships	Hyères, France	56th	Senior race	
