= Leeds City Athletic Club =

English athletics club

- Founded: September 1967
- Ground: John Charles Centre for Sport; South Leeds Stadium
- Location: Belle Isle, Leeds LS11 5DJ
- Coordinates: 53.45530°N 1.32264°W
- Website: official website

Leeds City Athletic Club is an English athletics club based in Leeds, England and is affiliated to England Athletics. The club is based at the John Charles Centre for Sport and train on Tuesdays and Thursdays.

== History ==
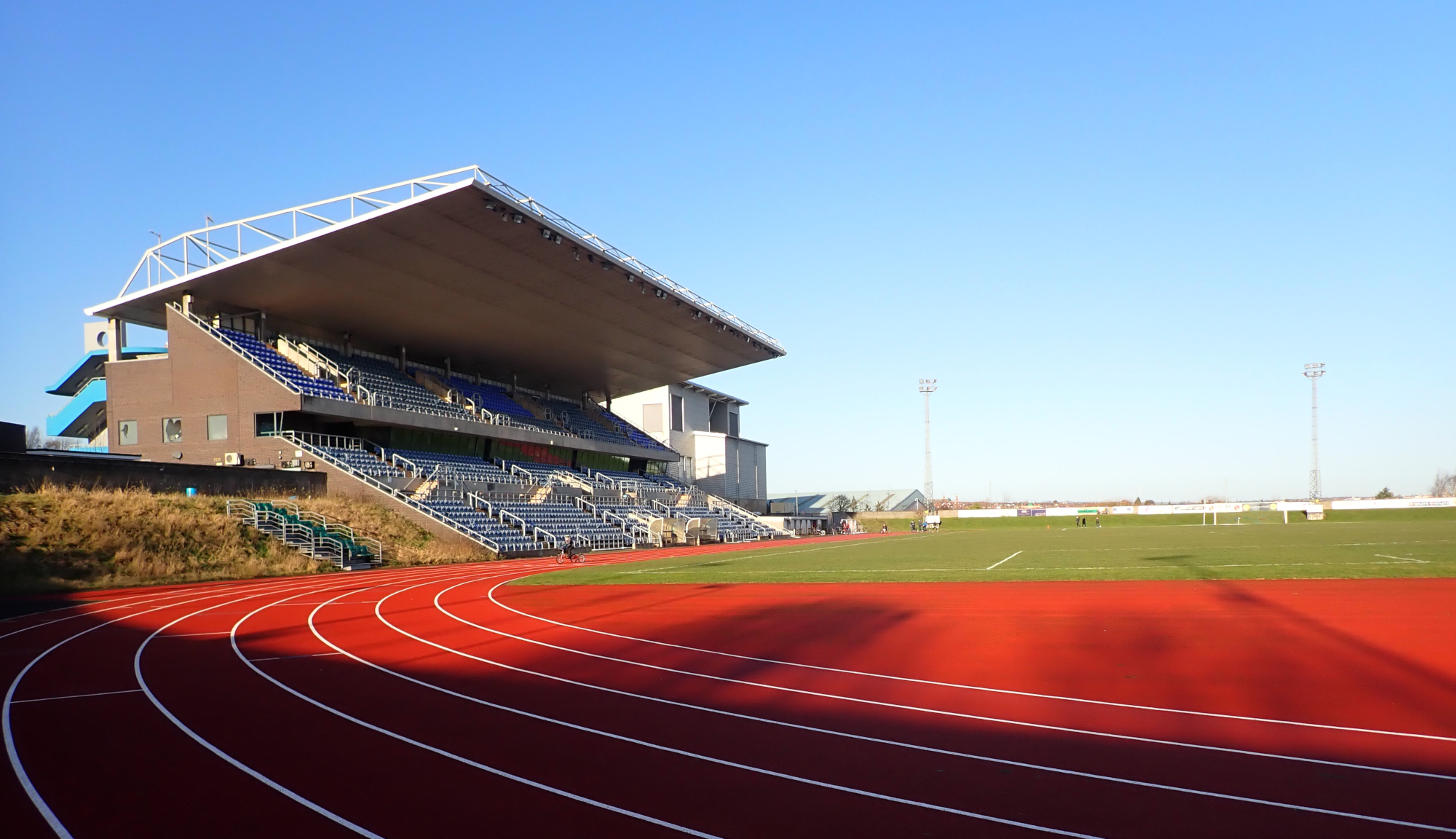
The South Leeds Stadium in 2022

The club's roots can be traced back to four clubs and the year 1880, with the formation of the first of these, the Leeds St. Mark's Harriers (LSMH). Two other clubs, the Leeds Harehills Harriers and the Leeds Athletic Club Harriers amalgamated in 1891 to form the Leeds Athletic Club (LAC).

Finally, the Harehills Liberal Club Harriers (HLCH) was founded in 1907. HLCH won the youth's event gold medal at the English National Cross Country Championships in 1946.

Frank E Aaron of the Leeds St Marks AC won three consecutive individual titles at the English National Cross Country Championships from 1949 to 1951.

In September 1967, a merger took place of the three clubs (HLCH, LSMH and LAC), to form the Leeds City Athletic Club.

The club's first Olympians appeared at the 1988 Summer Olympics in Seoul, although Len Eyre was a Harehills Harrier, when he competed at the 1952 Summer Olympics.

The club has evolved into becoming one of England's most successful cross country clubs, having won the team title at the English National Cross Country Championships on 12 occasions (as of 2025).

== Honours ==
- English National Cross Country Championships winners:
  - Frank E. Aaron - 1949, 1950, 1951
  - Angie Pain- 1989
  - Men's team, 2003, 2006, 2007, 2008, 2011, 2012, 2019, 2023
  - Women's team, 1997, 2019, 2022, 2025

== Notable athletes ==
=== Olympians ===
Athlete	Events	Games	Medals/Ref
Len Eyre	1500m	1952	
(Republic of Ireland) John Doherty	5,000m	1988, 1992	
Mick Hill	Javelin throw	1988, 1992, 1996, 2000	
Angie Pain	marathon	1988	
Véronique Marot	marathon	1972	
Jacob Fincham-Dukes	Long jump	2024	
Emile Cairess	marathon	2024	

- English unless stated
