= Glynn Tromans =

English long-distance runner

Personal information
- Nationality: British (English)
- Born: 17 March 1969 (age 56) Coventry, England

Sport
- Sport: Athletics
- Event(s): 10,000m, cross country and road
- Club: Coventry Godiva Harriers

Glynn Andrew Tromans (born 17 March 1969), is a male former athlete who competed for Great Britain and England. Tromans won seventeen National and British titles on track, road and country, including a record of five CAU/UK Cross Country victories.

== Biography ==
Tromans represented England in the 10,000 metres event, at the 1998 Commonwealth Games in Kuala Lumpur, Malaysia.

He became the British 10,000 metres champion after winning the British AAA Championships title at the 2001 AAA Championships.

Tromans won three English National Cross Country Championships titles in 2000, 2004 and 2005.

He has coached international competitors in athletics, triathlon and the paralympic sport of Boccia. He is employed as a performance coach by the UK Boccia Federation.
