= Dudley and Stourbridge Harriers =

British athletics club

- Founded: 1924; 101 years ago (as Dudley Harriers)
- Ground: Dell Stadium
- Location: Bryce Rd, Brierley Hill DY5 4NE, England
- Coordinates: 52°29′23″N 2°08′06″W
- Website: official website

Dudley and Stourbridge Harriers is an athletics club founded in 1924. Originally established as Dudley Harriers, it took on its current name through the amalgamation with Stourbridge, Wordsley and District Harriers.

The Dell Stadium has been the home of training and competition for the club since its opening in 1964.

== History ==
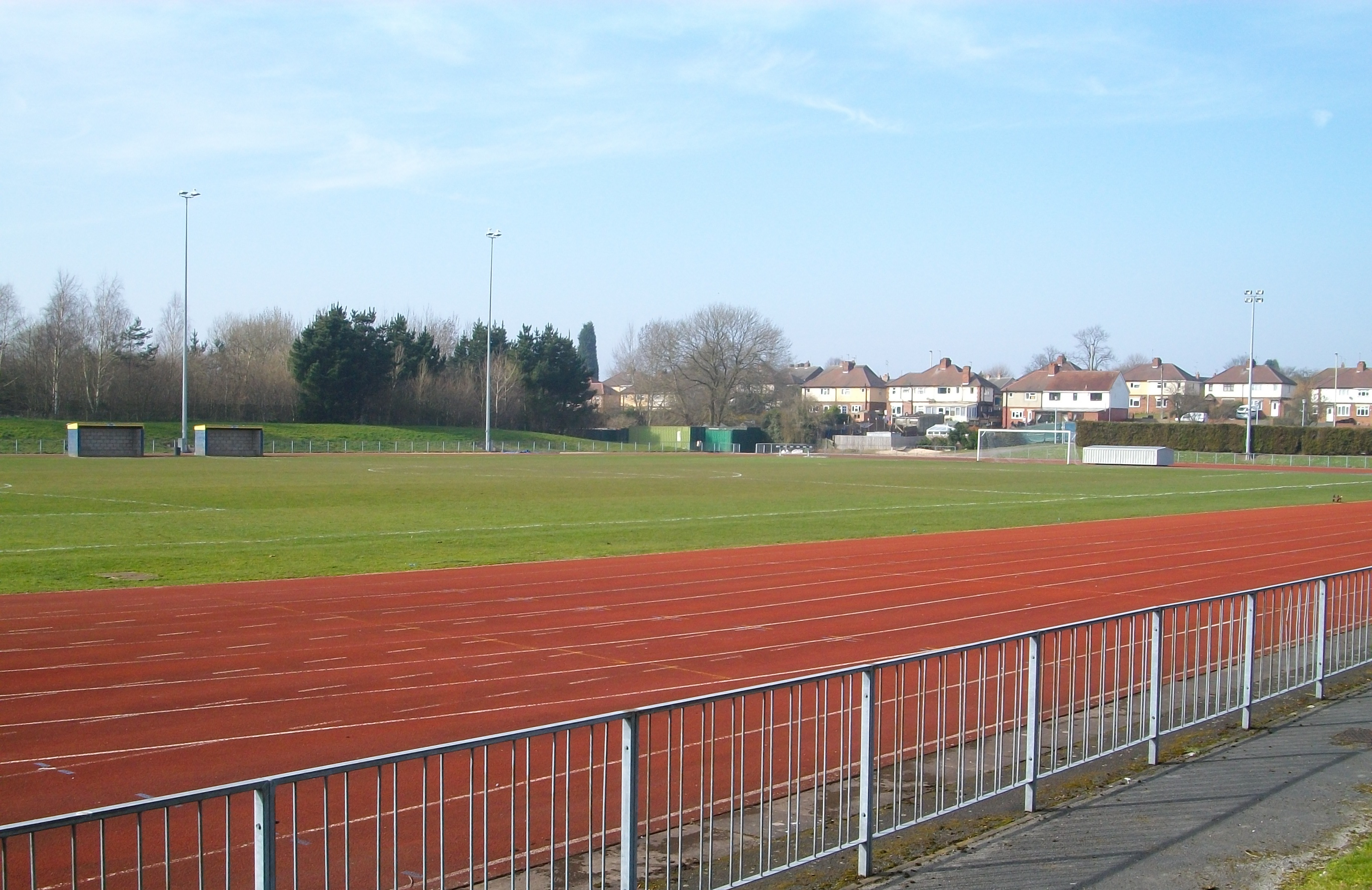
The Dell Stadium in 2014

The history of many athletics clubs within the Midlands can trace their history back to Birchfield Harriers. Prior to 1924 athletics clubs could have multiple branches across a region.

On 24 September 1910, at the Annual General Meeting of the Birchfield Harriers Tipton branch, the Tipton Harriers decided to become independent. As the Tipton Harriers membership grew, club branches were founded at Wolverhampton, Dudley, Wednesbury and Cradley Heath. However, in 1924 the M.C.A.A.A banned the practice of having club branches and subsequently the Dudley branch dissociated themselves from the Tipton Harriers and formed the Dudley Harriers and A C.

The newly formed club set up headquarters at the Gipsies Tent Inn, Steppingstone Street. A representative of Dudley Harriers attended the April 1925 meeting to form the Birmingham & District Invitation Cross Country League.

Meanwhile a club known as the Stourbridge, Wordsley and District Harriers (SW&DH) were invited to join the Birmingham Cross Country League on 21 September 1931.

In 1963 the two clubs, Dudley Harriers and Stourbridge, Wordsley and District Harriers agreed to amalgamate into the present club in 1963.

DASH was a founding member of the Youth Athletics Cross Country League in 1975.

== Competition Results ==
Birmingham & District Invitation Cross Country League Results
	Dudley & Stourbridge Harriers
1963	5th Second Division
1964	3rd Third Division
1965	5th Third Division
1966	DNF
1967	4th Third Division
1968	4th Third Division
1969	3rd Third Division
1970	1st Third Division
1971	6th Second Division
1972	8th Second Division
1973	5th Third Division
1974	6th Third Division
1975	DNF
1976	6th Third Division
1977	6th Third Division
1978	3rd Third Division
1979	2nd Third Division
1980	11th Second Division
1981	6th Third Division
1982	8th Third Division
1983	10th Third Division
1984	6th Third Division
1985	9th Third Division
1986	9th Third Division
1987	9th Third Division
1988	10th Third Division
1989	11th Third Division
1990	3rd Fourth Division
1991	10th Third Division
1992	12th Third Division
1993	3rd Fourth Division
1994	3rd Third Division
1995	1st Third Division
1996	9th Second Division
1997	8th Second Division
1998	12th Second Division
1999	DNF
2000	3rd Fourth Division
2001	4th Third Division
2002	13th Second Division
2003	10th Third Division
2004	7th Third Division
2005	3rd Third Division
2006	13th Second Division
2007	13th Second Division
2008	11th Second Division
2009	11th Second Division
2010	10th Second Division
2011	5th Second Division
2012	8th Second Division
2013	11th Second Division
2014	7th Second Division
2015	14th Second Division
2016	6th Second Division
2017	9th Second Division
2018	9th Second Division
2019	Current Season
