= Tipton Harriers =

British athletics club

- Founded: 1910
- Ground: Tipton Sports Academy
- Location: Wednesbury Oak Rd, Tipton DY4 0BS, West Midlands, England
- Coordinates: 52°32′43″N 2°03′15″W
- Website: official website

Tipton Harriers are a running team based at the Tipton Sports Academy on the Wednesbury Oak Road in Tipton, West Midlands, England. They are regularly on top in the Wharfedale Triangle League, a league between Wolves and Bilston AC, Tipton Harriers and Dudley and Stourbridge Harriers.

== History ==
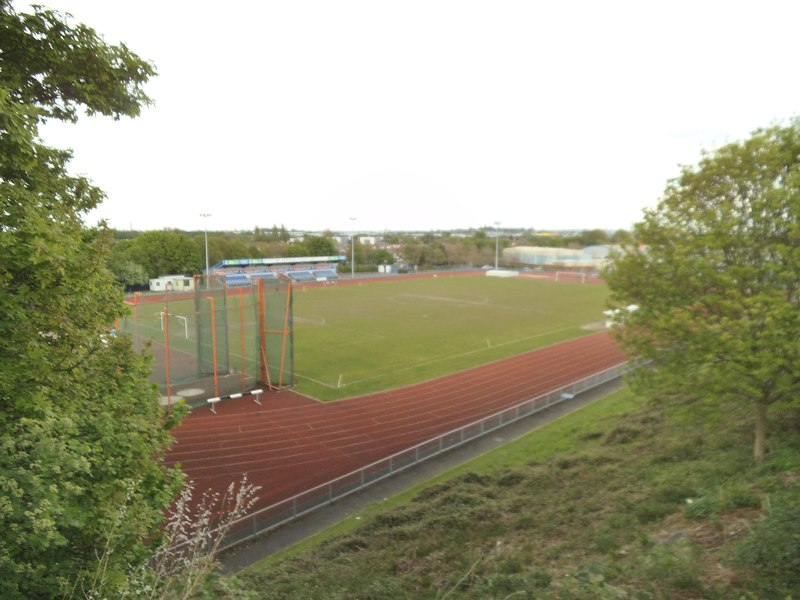
The athletics track in 2013

Tipton Harriers were created in September 1910, when the members of the Tipton branch of Birchfield Harriers resolved to end their connection and become independent. Soon, over 40 members were meeting and training regularly from a former painters' workshop and store in a loft behind a shop and houses in Waterloo Street. These primitive facilities, sparsely furnished, using two 18 feet square, 8 inches deep beer cooling vats as baths with water heated in an old copper washing boiler, remained the club H.Q. until 1936. The house where the formation took place was demolished in the 1960s.

Much of this happened despite serious bomb damage during the Zeppelin raids in 1916 and the obstruction of the non-improving landlady.

In competition the green and white hooped vests with the whippet emblem surmounting the slogan "Swift and Eager", soon became a force to be reckoned with in cross-country competition. This despite the demands of the armed forces and munitions work during World War 1, and the ravages caused by the economic depressions of the 1920s and early 1930s when at times up to 80% of the members were unemployed. After the war membership grew and club branches were founded at Wolverhampton, Dudley, Wednesbury and Cradley Heath until this practice was banned by the M.C.A.A.A. in 1924.

The first major team successes, winning the Midlands 'junior' and Staffordshire Championships arrived in the 1925–26 season where they were also runners-up in the Midland Senior Championship. This marked the beginning of the first golden age for the club, which was dominated by two outstanding individuals, Jack Holden and the club president 'Innie' Palethorpe. Together they transformed the image and the reputation of the club. Holden won the individual English National Cross Country Championships in 1938, 1939 and 1946 and won the Polytechnic Marathon in 1948, 1949 and 1950.

The Harrier public house, which opened on Powis Avenue in the 1950s, is named after Tipton Harriers.

From 1978 until 2000, the Tipton Harriers won the English National Cross Country Championships twelve times and Matt Smith won the individual event in 2003.

== Notable athletes ==
=== Olympians ===
Athlete	Events	Games	Medals/Ref
Jack Holden	marathon	1948	
Allan Rushmer	5000m	1968	
Andy Holden	3000m steeplechase	1972	
(Scotland) Ian Stewart	5000m	1972, 1976	Bronze medal
Eddie Wedderburn	3000m steeplechase	1988	
Dan Robinson	marathon	2004, 2008	
