= Allan Rushmer =

British long-distance runner (1944–2024)

Personal information
- Nationality: British (English)
- Born: 27 February 1944 Birmingham, England
- Died: 23 April 2024 (aged 80) York, England
- Height: 170 cm (5 ft 7 in)
- Weight: 59 kg (130 lb)

Sport
- Sport: Athletics
- Event: middle/long distance
- Club: Tipton Harriers
Medal record
Athletics
Representing England
British Empire & Commonwealth Games
Bronze medal – third place	1966 Kingston	3 miles

Allan Trevor Rushmer (27 February 1944 – 23 April 2024) was a British long-distance runner.

== Athletics career ==
Rushmer competed in the 1968 Summer Olympics.

Rushmer represented the England team and won a bronze medal in the 3 miles race, at the 1966 British Empire and Commonwealth Games in Kingston, Jamaica.

Four years later he participated in the 5,000 metres at the 1970 British Commonwealth Games in Edinburgh, Scotland.

== Death ==
Rushmer died in York on 23 April 2024, at the age of 80.
