= Aldershot, Farnham and District Athletic Club =

British athletics club

Aldershot, Farnham and District
- Full name: Aldershot, Farnham and District Athletic Club
- Founded: 1966; 60 years ago
- Ground: Aldershot Military Stadium
- Location: Queen's Avenue, Aldershot, England
- Coordinates: 51°15′53″N 0°45′17″W
- Website: official website

Aldershot, Farnham and District Athletic Club is an athletics club based in Aldershot, Hampshire, England. The club are based at the Aldershot Military Stadium in Aldershot, Hampshire. AFD competes in the Youth Development League (YDL), Hampshire and Surrey Leagues, various relay events including the Southern Road Relays and National Road and Cross Country Relays.

The middle/long distance coaching is currently led by former international athlete Mick Woods and the club trains its middle and long distance athletes at various locations including the polo fields opposite the Military Stadium on Queen's Avenue and The Wellington Statue, Aldershot.

The sprint section is led by various coaches and the race walking teams are run and trained by former Commonwealth Games athlete Verity Snook-Larby.

== History ==
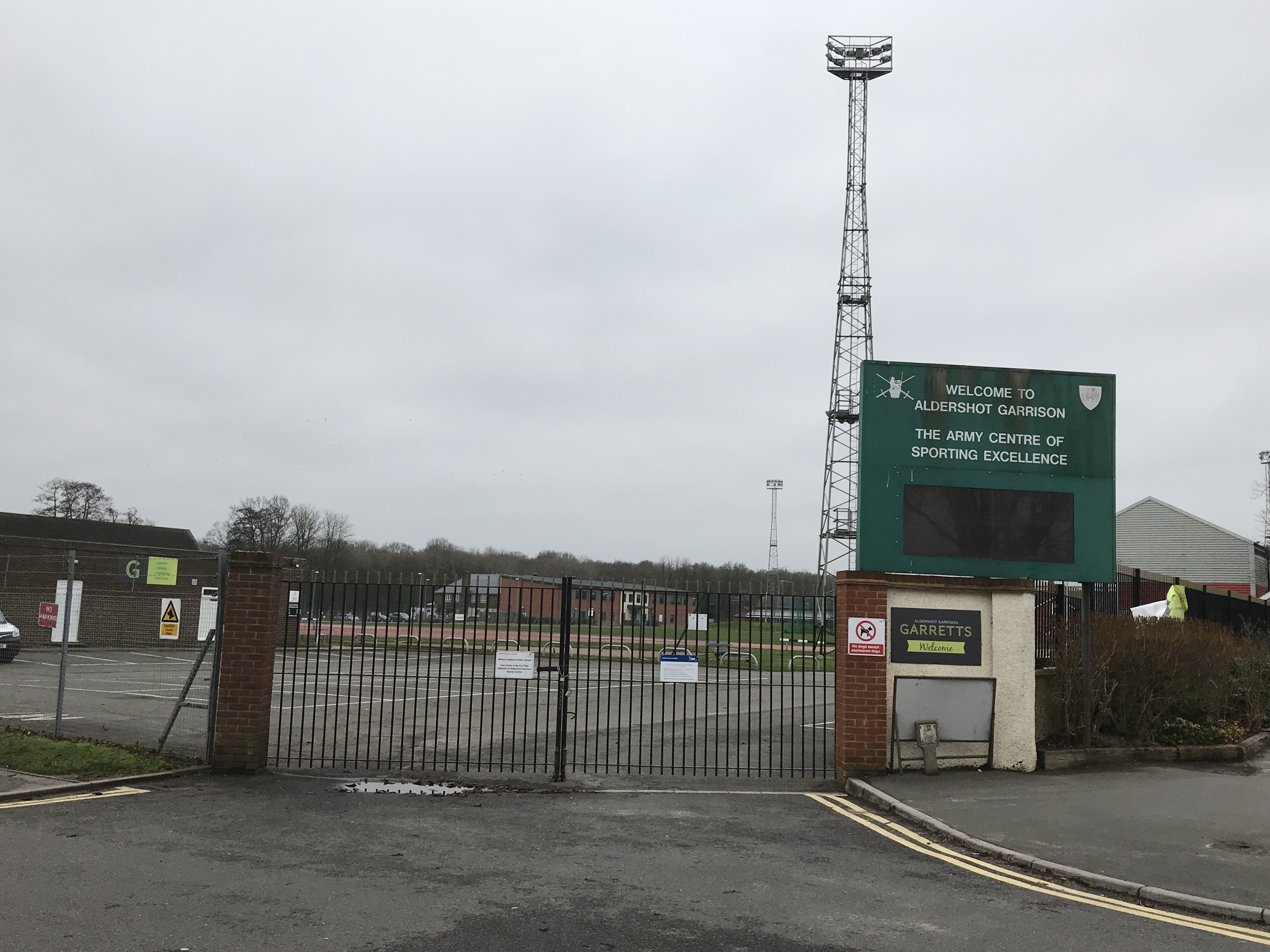
Aldershot Military Stadium in 2021

The founding of Aldershot, Farnham and District Athletic Club on 7 August 1966. Formally known as Aldershot and District A.C., the club eventually merged with Farnham A.C. The negotiations between Farnham, Guildford and Godalming A.C. stumbled over the inclusion of Godalming in the name. As the Guildford and Godalming clubs had previously merged about a decade before, they wished to include their name in full while Farnham thought the name in full would be 'too much of a mouthful'.

At the time, the Aldershot Club, whose colours were white with green hoops (the same as existing colours of AFD, minus the red of Farnham), were mainly a very strong ladies club with a newly emerging boys and youths section, which had just competed with distinction for the first time in the ECCU National at Graves Park, Sheffield. The ladies through Sheena Fitzmaurice, Pat Card and Margaret Bram had made an effective climb to the top of women's cross country. At the time the club had just received permission to organise its Sunday morning training at the Mons track at the back of the Military Stadium. Aldershot, for the first time, got permission to put on the annual Trophies Meetings at the Military Stadium and used the grass track at Aldershot Park for other matches.

In its early years the club, commonly known as AFD, organized a Track and Field League and a Cross Country League for local schoolboys. Indoor training took place at North Camp for girls and at St Michael's School for boys under the direction of Tim Carroll.

AFD organised women's and youths and boys road relays in Aldershot which attracted huge entries and were the most popular in the country. As well as the schools they got great help from, the British Army helped and the club used Army Junior Units as venues for the Cross Country Leagues. In conjunction with the former Aldershot Borough Council, evening sports meeting were arranged which was often the introduction for young school children and young servicemen to the sport. The Aldershot Council also helped to buy an old Army hut which we re-erected in Aldershot Park as the club headquarters at the new grass track.

The Farnham Club, whose colours were red, were mainly a harriers club based at the Memorial Ground in Farnham with its unique grass 300 yards track. The club organised a popular Paarlauf each year, which attracted International athletes. They also organised a popular Cross Country Relay in Farnham Park. The club was made up mainly of seniors with most of the administration undertaken by Alan Mason, who was one of the first coaches to go through the Loughborough Summer School under the founder of the coaching system in Britain, Geoff Dyson. The leading athlete was Ron Stonehouse, who had the misfortune to be a contemporary of Brasher, Shirley, Disley, Chataway, Norris and Pirie and would in any other era have been one of the greats of the sport.

With the formation of the Rushmoor Borough Council from the former Aldershot and Farnborough Councils, they were later to get the financial support which enabled them to use the Military Stadium for training. In 1966 it cost committee members 2 shillings (10 pence) per week to keep the club going, and the members also paid 1 shilling (5 pence) for training. It was not unusual for AFD to fill a coach on a Sunday morning to visit Elvetham or Frensham for organised training.

On the night of 8 November 2016 at around 7:10pm, two promising young athletes, Lucy Pygott, 17, and Stacey Burrows, 16, were killed by a drunk driver whilst crossing Queen's Avenue as they jogged from the stadium to begin their evening training session. Despite the best efforts of paramedics and the air ambulance crews to save the two girls, they were pronounced dead at the scene. Lucy Pygott, who was from Hartley Wintney, represented Great Britain in July at the 2016 European Athletics Youth Championships in Tbilisi, Georgia, where she won a bronze medal in the Under 18 3000 metres. Stacey Burrows, who was from Farnborough, was the Hampshire Under 17 3000 metres champion.

In a statement, the club said:

″These athletes, who were highly valued members of our club, played a huge role in the recent success of AFD, including last weekend's National Cross Country Relays where the club took five out of the ten titles awarded. The club is absolutely devastated to lose such amazing, talented young female athletes. Our thoughts and prayers are with the two families who are being supported by the police family liaison team.

Additionally, the club are very aware that many athletes, parents and coaches have been greatly affected by this incident which we are currently arranging support for them and their families. As a club, we are humbled by the many messages of support that have been received from across the World which further demonstrates the wealth of feeling and respect for these two young ladies within the athletics community.

The club would like to thank fellow athletes, Hart Football Club and many bystanders who were backed by professional support from the Military Police, the Surrey, Sussex and Kent Air Ambulance, South East Coast Ambulance Service and Hampshire Police for their extraordinary attention at the time of the incident″.

Tributes were paid across the world, with most races including the Hampshire Cross Country League match in Bournemouth, the Start Fitness Metropolitan Cross Country League match in Stevenage and the British Athletics Cross Challenge fixture in Milton Keynes, the following weekend being preceded by a minutes silence and runners wearing black or AFD-coloured ribbons on their vests. The 24-year-old driver, later named as serving soldier, Michael Casey, who was found to be over the drink-drive limit, the speed limit and drove through red lights, admitted to death by dangerous driving by driving through red lights and was subsequently jailed for six years, disqualified from driving for 10 years and dismissed from the British Army.

Athletes nominated for the 2016 Athletics Weekly British Under 18 athlete of the year award paid further tribute to Stacey Burrows and Lucy Pygott by requesting that the award be made to the two talented teenage runners. Following the tragedy, Athletics Weekly was contacted by European youth silver medallist, Sabrina Sinha on behalf of her fellow award nominees who had come to the collective decision that they wished to see the honour jointly awarded to the two girls.

On 20 October 2018, a memorial bench and plaque dedicated to the memory of the girls were presented at the Aldershot Military Stadium.

In 2018, AFD was ranked number one running club in the country statistically by Jegmar.

== Notable athletes ==
=== Olympians ===
Athlete	Events	Olympics	Medals/Pos, Ref
Alan Blinston	5000m	1968	
Barbara Inkpen	High jump	1968, 1972	13th, 4th
Bernie Ford	10,000 metres, marathon	1976, 1980	8th, DNF
Roger Hackney	3000 metres steeplechase	1980, 1984, 1988	7th (heat), 10th, DNF (heat)
Christina Boxer	1500 metres	1980, 1984, 1988	8th (heat), 6th, 4th
Zola Budd	3000 metres	1984, 1992	7th, 9th (heat)
Steph Twell	1500 metres, 5,000 metres	2008, 2016, 2020	6th (heat), 8th (heat), 68th
Chris Thompson	10,000 metres	2012, 2020	25th, 53rd
Beth Potter	10,000 metres	2016	34th
Jess Andrews	10,000 metres	2016	16th
Andy Vernon	10,000 metres	2016	25th

- + British unless stated

=== Commonwealth Games ===
Athlete	Events	Games	Medals/Pos, Ref
Barbara Inkpen	High Jump	1974	1974
Christina Boxer	1500 metres	1978, 1982, 1986	1982, 1990
(Wales) Roger Hackney	3000 metres steeplechase	1982, 1986, 1990	1986
Ruth Partridge	3000 metres	1990	
(Scotland) Verity Snook-Larby	10km walk	1994	
Ben Moreau	Marathon	2010, 2014	
Charlotte Purdue	10,000 metres	2010	
(Scotland) Steph Twell	1500 metres, 5000 metres	2010, 2014, 2018	2010
Aaron Harris	Triathlon	2014	
Andy Vernon	5000 metres	2010	
Isobel Pooley	High jump	2014	2014
(Scotland) Lennie Waite	3000 metres steeplechase	2010, 2014	
(Gibraltar) Harvey Dixon	1500 metres	2014	
Emelia Górecka	5000 metres	2014	

- + English unless stated

== Competition placings ==
=== English National Cross Country Championships ===
Winners

- Senior men
  - Bernie Ford 1976, 1978
  - Andy Vernon 2010
  - Jonathan Hay 2016
  - Hugo Milner 2024
- Senior women
  - Ruth Smeeth 1980
  - Stephanie Twell 2010
  - Lily Partridge 2015, 2016
  - Emily Hosker Thornhill 2019
  - Anna Moller 2020
  - Niamh Brown 2024
- Senior men team - 1983, 1984, 1985, 2010
- Senior women team - 1979, 1984, 2013, 2014, 2015, 2016, 2017, 2020
- Junior men - 1972, 1988, 1998, 2000, 2002, 2003, 2004, 2005, 2006, 2008, 2010, 2012, 2013, 2016, 2017
- Junior women - 2004, 2005, 2008, 2009, 2010, 2011, 2012, 2013, 2014, 2015, 2017
- Under 17 men - 1994, 2001, 2007, 2008, 2009, 2012
- Under 17 women - 1994, 2002, 2003, 2004, 2008, 2009, 2010, 2011, 2012, 2013, 2015, 2016
- Under 15 boys - 2003, 2009, 2013, 2018
- Under 15 girls - 1997, 2001, 2002, 2005, 2006, 2007, 2008, 2009, 2010, 2011, 2012, 2015
- Under 13 girls - 1999, 2000, 2001, 2002, 2004, 2006, 2008, 2009

=== European Club Champions Cup Cross Country ===
- Winners
  - Men - 1984, 1985, 1986
  - Women - 1980, 1985

=== National Cross Country Relays ===
- Winners
  - Senior men - 2013, 2016
  - Senior women - 2013, 2014, 2016, 2017
  - Under 20 men - 2010, 2023
  - Under 20 women - 2008, 2009, 2010, 2012, 2013, 2014
  - Under 17 men - 2014, 2017
  - Under 17 women - 2006, 2007, 2008, 2009, 2010, 2015, 2016
  - Under 15 boys - 2007, 2016, 2018
  - Under 15 girls - 2007, 2008, 2009, 2010, 2011, 2012
  - Under 13 boys - 2007, 2015, 2016
  - Under 13 girls - 2006, 2007, 2008, 2009

=== National Road Relays ===
- Winners
    - Senior men (12 stage) - 1982, 2004
  - Senior women (6 stage) - 2008, 2010, 2011, 2012, 2013, 2014, 2015, 2016
  - Senior men (6 stage) - 1981, 2011, 2014
  - Senior women (4 stage) - 1971, 1972, 1981, 1986, 2007, 2008, 2009, 2010, 2011, 2012, 2013, 2014, 2016, 2017, 2018
  - Under 17 men - 2017
  - Under 17 women - 1971, 1972, 1999, 2000, 2009, 2010, 2015, 2016
  - Under 15 boys - 2001, 2018
  - Under 15 girls - 1997, 1998, 2000, 2001, 2009, 2010, 2011
  - Under 13 boys - 1999, 2000, 2001, 2017
  - Under 13 girls - 1972, 1974, 1998, 1999, 2000, 2001, 2009

=== Race Walking Champions Cup ===
- Winners
  - Senior Ladies - 2013

== Club links ==
Country	Club
(United Kingdom)	Windsor, Slough, Eton and Hounslow Athletic Club
(Finland)	Porvoon Urheilijat
