= Bernie Ford =

British long-distance runner

Personal information
- Nationality: British (English)
- Born: 3 August 1952 (age 73) Woking, Surrey
- Height: 180 cm (5 ft 11 in)
- Weight: 64 kg (141 lb)

Sport
- Sport: Athletics
- Event: long-distance
- Club: Aldershot, Farnham & District AC

Bernard William Ford (born 3 August 1952) is a British former long-distance runner who competed at the 1976 Summer Olympics and the 1980 Summer Olympics.

== Biography ==
Ford was a member of the Aldershot, Farnham & District AC and finished second behind Dave Bedford in the10,000 metres event at the 1974 AAA Championships.

At the 1976 Olympics Games in Montreal, he represented Great Britain in the 10,000 metres event.

He would be on the 10,000 metres podium at the AAA Championships on two more occasions in 1975 and 1980. Shortly after the last in 1980 he represented Great Britain at the 1980 Olympics Games in Moscow in the marathon but failed to finish.

He competed at nine consecutive editions of the IAAF World Cross Country Championships from 1973 to 1981 and won the Rome marathon in 1984.

He is married to Anne Ford.
