= English Cross Country Association =

- Sport: Cross country running
- Abbreviation: ECCA
- Founded: 1888
- Location: Wallington House, Solihull
- Chairman: John Temperton
- Secretary: Ian Byett

Official website
- www.englishcrosscountry.co.uk
- (England)

The English Cross Country Association (ECCA) is the governing body of cross country running in England. Its objectives are to promote and develop cross country running and to advance and safeguard the interests of the sport and the governing body. It organises the English National Cross Country Championships where athletes compete for their clubs, and manages the England teams in cross country competition, including the selection of athletes for some international permit events.

It was founded in 1992 with the joining of the English Cross Country Union and the Women’s Cross Country and Road Running Association. Its headquarters are located at the England Athletics headquarters in Solihull.

The ECCA is distinct from the UK Counties Athletics Union, which organises inter-county competition and holds the annual Inter-County Cross Country Championships. At the Inter-Counties athletes represent (and are selected by) their home counties, not their clubs.

== History ==
The National Cross-Country Union was founded in 1883 and in 1933 the organisation was renamed the English Cross-Country Union (ECCU).

The ECCA was founded 1992 with the joining of the English Cross Country Union and the Women’s Cross Country and Road Running Association. And soon united of the men’s and women’s Nationals on one day and at one venue. The first joint English National Cross Country Championships was held at Luton in 1995.

== Teams ==
The policy of the Association is to send teams to major international cross country events, in order that athletes develop and gain experience of travelling and competing against elite athletes from other Countries.

England teams become selected for the Senior age group and the IAAF Under 20/Junior age groups for both men and women. No athletes who are under the age of 16 on the day of competition will be selected and if under 18 will be required to complete a parental consent form.

== Sponsorship ==
The ECCA and Saucony have agreed a new three-year deal to sponsor the English National Cross Country Championships and the English Cross Country Relays. The new agreement is starting on 1 January 2009 and following on from the six years that Saucony have already sponsored the Championships. The successful partnership has seen the Numbers taking part in some of the age groups grow in the size while the Relays have gone from strength to strength.

== See also ==
- National Council for School Sport
