= Mick Woods =

Irish distance runner (born 1949)

Michael 'Mick' Woods
- Born: 15 February 1949 (age 76) (Great Britain)
- Occupation(s): Performance Coach; Former distance runner, sports lecturer, running coach
- Years active: 1964–1986 (athlete); 1986–1994 (coach/athlete); 1994–present (coach)
- Employer(s): St Mary's University, Twickenham, London 2003–2025

Michael 'Mick' Woods (born 15 February 1949 in Great Britain) is a former long-distance runner and a middle/long-distance running coach. He is currently a coach at Aldershot, Farnham & District AC and sports lecturer at St Mary's University in London. As an athlete, Woods ran internationally for Ireland and ran in over 70 marathons, with a personal best of 2:20.12. Woods is now one of his country's leading endurance running coaches.

== Athletics career ==
Mick Woods' first marathon was the Polytechnic Marathon in 1971. He has been a member of Aldershot, Farnham and District Athletics Club since 1964. Woods ended up completing more than 70 marathons in his career with a personal best of 2:20:12, achieved in the London Marathon in 1983. He represented Ireland in various international marathon races.

Mick has an outstanding coaching record that has seen numerous junior athletes make GB World and European championships, athletes including:

Stephanie Twell – competed in the 1500m at the 2008 Beijing Olympics and the 5000m at the 2016 Rio Olympics, 1500m Bronze medallist at the 2010 Commonwealth Games and 5000m Bronze medallist at the 2016 European Champs

Emma Pallant – gold medallist in the 2011 U23 cross country championships

Beth Potter – 2014 Commonwealth Games 5000m 9th & 10,000m 5th and Rio Olympic Games 10,000m finalist

Anna Emilie Møller – double gold medallist 2019 U23 European Championships 5000m & 3000m steeplechase. Doha World Championships 7th, 3000m steeplechase, 2019. Gold medallist European U23 Cross Country Championships 2019.

== Coaching career ==
Woods was based at St Mary's University in London. He has been coaching since 1986 and has been extremely successful, putting numerous junior athletes into European Championships, GB teams and even the Olympic Games. Woods is currently coach to nearly 300 athletes, playing a huge role in developing international track and cross country athletes for Great Bitian. Woods has coached Jonathan "Jonny" Hay, Ellis Cross, Louise Small Anna Emilie Moller, Emily Hosker Thorn-hill, Phillipa Bowden, Niamh Brown, Phoebe Law, Amelia Quirk and many more, to international and national success.

In 2003, Woods was employed by UK Athletics as a performance coach.

In 2008, he was presented with the English Athletics Association Coach Of The Year Award.

In 2014, Woods was asked by Athletics Weekly about his retirement and his response was, "I like seeing athletes come through and improve and I coach athletes to race. As I get older, such a busy lifestyle is becoming more of a challenge, but I do not envisage retiring. Athletics is in my blood”.

== Personal bests ==
Marathon – 2:20.12 – London, England, 1983
