= 1993 German Athletics Championships =

- Edition: 93rd
- Start date: 9 July
- End date: 11 July
- Host city: Duisburg, Germany
- Venue: Wedaustadion
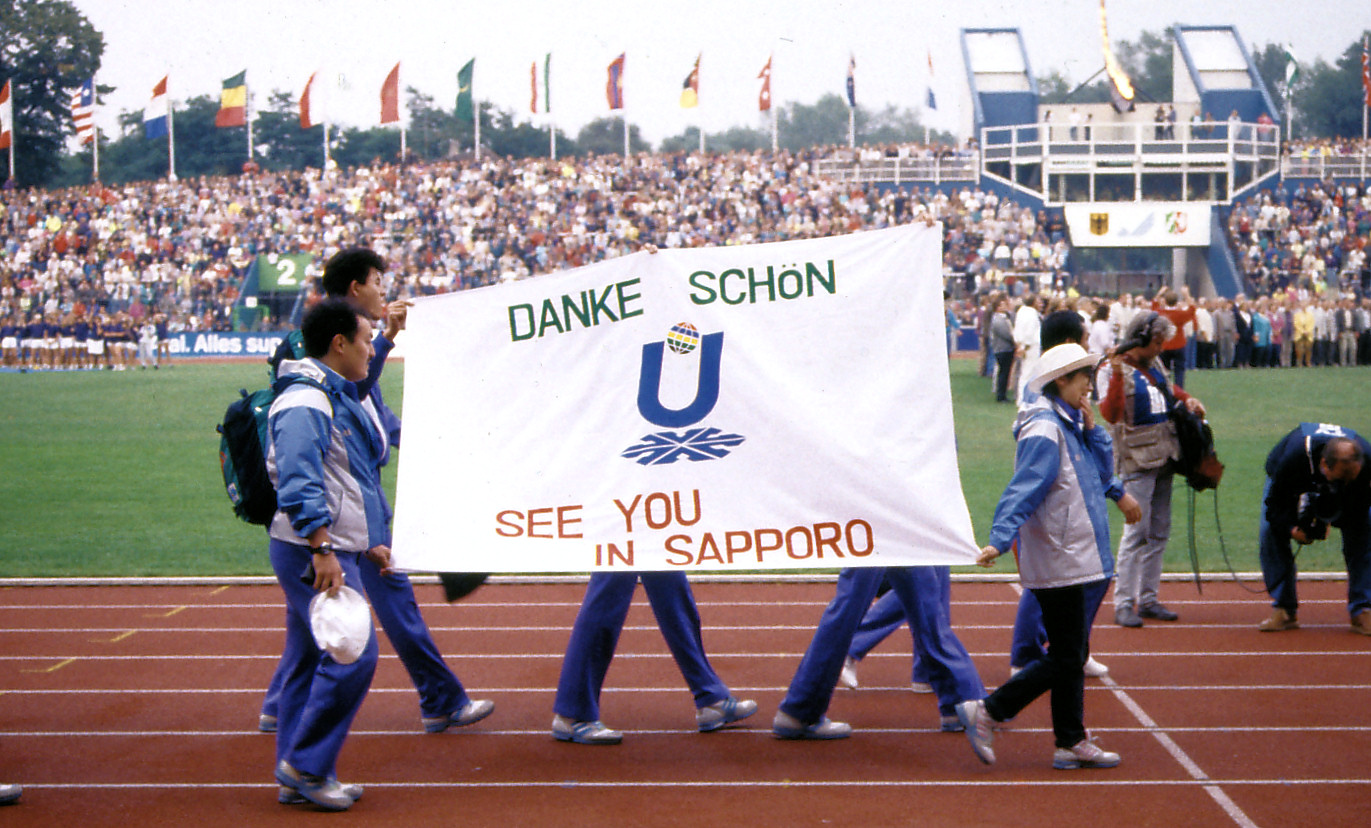
- Events: 40 (+37)

The 1993 German Athletics Championships was the 93rd edition of the national championship in outdoor track and field for Germany. It was held on 8–11 July at the Wedaustadion in Duisburg. It served as the selection meeting for Germany at the 1993 World Championships in Athletics. A women's hammer throw was contested for the first time and the road running championship was set to the half marathon, having previously been 15 km for women and 25 km for men.

== Championships ==
As usual, due to time or organizational reasons, various competitions were not held as part of the main event in Duisburg. The annual national championships in Germany held separately from the main track and field competition comprised the following:

Event	Venue	Date(s)	Notes
Cross country running	Rhede	6 March	
Half marathon	Chemnitz	21 March	
Marathon	Hannover	18 April	incorporated into the Hannover Marathon
10,000 metres	Trier	15 May	
Relays; Women's 3 × 800 m Men's 4 × 800 m Men's 4 × 1500 m	Dortmund	4 July	incorporated into the German Youth Athletics Championships
Combined track and field events Women's heptathlon Men's decathlon	Vaterstetten	19–20 June	
100K run	Rheine	4 September	
Mountain running	Berchtesgaden	3 October	Held in conjunction with the Jenner-Berglaufs
Racewalking; Men's 50 km walk Women's 10 km walk	Horrem	23 May	

== Results ==
=== Men ===
Event	Gold		Silver		Bronze	
100 metres	Marc Blume; TV Wattenscheid	10.30 s	Steffen Görmer; SV Halle	10.42 s	Christian Konieczny; LG Olympia Dortmund	10.53 s
200 metres	Marc Blume; TV Wattenscheid	20.46 s	Michael Huke; TV Wattenscheid	20.62 s	Björn Sinnhuber; MTG Mannheim	20.68 s
400 metres	Thomas Schönlebe; LG Chemnitz	46.28 s	Rico Lieder; LG Chemnitz	46.34 s	Ralph Pfersich; LG Olympia Dortmund	46.45 s
800 metres	Nico Motchebon; SCC Berlin	1:49.69 min	Jussi Udelhoven; LG Bayer Leverkusen	1:50.11 min	Joachim Dehmel; SpVgg. Feuerbach	1:50.15 min
1500 metres	Jens-Peter Herold; SCC Berlin	3:49.86 min	Rüdiger Stenzel; TV Wattenscheid	3:50.49 min	Michael Busch; PSV Grün-Weiß Kassel	3:50.71 min
5000 metres	Rainer Wachenbrunner; Berliner SC	13:51.96 min	Markus Neukirch; SV Saar 05 Saarbrücken	13:52.38 min	Jens Karraß; SCC Berlin	13:53.28 min
10,000 metres	Stéphane Franke; SV Salamander Kornwestheim	27:57.98 min	Rainer Wachenbrunner; Berliner SC	28:24.50 min	Carsten Eich; SC DHfK Leipzig	28:40.74 min
Half marathon	Stephan Freigang; LC Cottbus	1:05:34 h	Kurt Stenzel; ASC Darmstadt	1:06:15 h	Christian Husmann; LG Braunschweig	1:06:30 h
Half marathon Team	LG Braunschweig; Christian Husmann; Markus Pingpank; Volker Krajenski	3:21:48 h	LAC Quelle Fürth / München; Klaus-Peter Nabein; Dirk Nürnberger; Engelbert Franz	3:21:54 h	SV Saar 05 Saarbrücken; Alfred Knickenberg; Rainer Müller; Michael Loth	3:25:04 h
Marathon	Kurt Stenzel; ASC Darmstadt	2:13:25 h	Konrad Dobler; SVO Germaringen	2:14:44 h	Uwe Honsdorf; Rot-Weiß Koblenz	2:17:07 h
Marathon team	LAC Quelle Fürth / München; Dirk Nürnberger; Eike Loch; Hans Forster	7:06:37 h	LG Frankfurt; Ulrich Wolf; Volker Isigkeit; Eckart Baier	7:17:33 h	LAC Quelle Fürth / München; Dirk Kellner; Frank Schnabel; Udo Grimm	7:18:38 h
100 kilometres	Volker Becker-Wirbel; LTF Marpingen	6:46:28 h	Michael Sommer; Eichenkreuz Schwaikheim	6:50:18 h	Heinz Hüglin; LV Ettenheim	6:52:16 h
100 kilometres team	LTF Marpingen; Volker Becker-Wirbel; Guido Joerg; Franz Feller	22:01:57 h	DJK Frankenberg Aachen; Hans Waack; Diethard Gansow; Burkhard Ernst Weber	22:33:02 h	LC Olympia Wiesbaden; Heinz-Werner Janicke; Michael Menz; Rudolf Raab	23:24:55 h
110 m hurdles	Dietmar Koszewski; LAC Halensee Berlin	13.56 s	Claude Edorh; ASV Köln	13.69 s	Eric Kaiser; TSV Wasserburg	13.94 s
400 m hurdles	Michael Kaul; USC Mainz	50.39 s	Edgar Itt; TV Gelnhausen	50.42 s	Michael Grün; LG Bayer Leverkusen	51.00 s
3000 m s'chase	Steffen Brand; TV Wattenscheid	8:26.81 min	Martin Strege; LG Baunatal/ACT Kassel	8:31.21 min	Kim Bauermeister; LG Filder	8:37.01 min
4 × 100 m relay	TV Wattenscheid; Holger Blume; Robert Kurnicki; Michael Huke; Marc Blume	39.57 s	VfL Sindelfingen; Holger Vogelsang; Oliver Schmidt; Michael Schwab; Marcus Skupin-Alfa	40.38 s	SV Salamander Kornwestheim; Patrick Schneider; Thomas Nitsch; Peter Klein; Daniel Leigh	40.60 s
4 × 400 m relay	LG Olympia Dortmund; Stefan Audehm; Udo Schiller; Bodo Unger; Ralf Pfersich	3:09.29 min	VfL Sindelfingen; Michael Schwab; Holger Vogelsang; Peter Mayer; Jörg Vaihinger	3:10.46 min	LAV Bayer Uerdingen / Dormagen; Heinz Hünnekes; Thomas Fobbe; Günther; Christian Kerberg	3:10.51 min
4 × 800 m relay	LG Bayer Leverkusen; Ralf Dahmen; Oliver Klaudt; Alexander Adam; Nico Udelhoven	7:19.55 min	MTV Ingolstadt; Hans Stamm; Alfred Hummel; Dieter Gabriel; Peter Braun	7:20.56 min	LAV Essen; Riedel; Große-Rhode; Frank van Thiel; Thorsten Kallweit	7:23.36 min
4 × 1500 m relay	TV Wattenscheid; Ingo Janich; Schulze; Stephan Plätzer; Rüdiger Stenzel	15:08.24 min	ESC Erfurt; Fromm; Thorsten Lenhardt; Hauke Fuhlbrügge; Dominique Löser	15:15.55 min	SCC Berlin; Gordon Schatz; Andreas Wagner; Olaf Beyer; Stephan Kabat	15:15.84 min
20 km walk	Robert Ihly; LG Offenburg	1:23:15 h	Hartwig Gauder; TSV Erfurt	1:23:31 h	Axel Noack; Berliner TSC	1:26:41 h
20 km walk team	LAC Quelle Fürth / München; Peter Zanner; Ralf Rose; Alfons Schwarz	4:36:04 h	TSV Erfurt; Hartwig Gauder; Thomas Prophet; Arnold	4:39:10 h	SV Friedrichsgabe; Dan Bauer; Dieter Zschiesche; Schulz	5:01:01 h
50 km walk	Hartwig Gauder; TSV Erfurt	3:52:46 h	Axel Noack; Berliner TSC	3:55:44 h	Volkmar Schulz; Berliner SV 1892	3:56:06 h
50 km walk team	Berliner SV 1892; Volkmar Scholz; Matthias Hütler; Detlef Heitmann	13:04:24 h	LAC Quelle Fürth; Peter Zanner; Alfons Schwarz; Hardy Koschollek	13:14:26 h	TV 1846 Groß-Gerau; Heinrich Hänsel; Rolf Fricke; Uwe Rowold	14:43:38 h
High jump	Wolf-Hendrik Beyer; LG Bayer Leverkusen	2.33 m	Ralf Sonn; TSG Weinheim	2.33 m	Carlo Thränhardt; LG Bayer Leverkusen	2.25 m
Pole vault	Tim Lobinger; LG Bayer Leverkusen	5.50 m	Werner Holl; LG VfB/Kickers Stuttgart	5.40 m	Marc Osenberg; LG Bayer Leverkusen	5.40 m
Long jump	Georg Ackermann; LG Karlsruhe	8.00 m	Bernhard Kelm; TSV Wasserburg	7.98 m	Christian Thomas; TV Heppenheim	7.98 m
Triple jump	Ralf Jaros; TV Wattenscheid	17.13 m	Volker Mai; SC Neubrandenburg	16.41 m	Wolfgang Knabe; TV Wattenscheid	16.37 m
Shot put	Oliver-Sven Buder; TV Wattenscheid	20.15 m	Jonny Reinhardt; TV Wattenscheid	19.35 m	Michael Mertens; VfL Wolfsburg	18.74 m
Discus throw	Lars Riedel; USC Mainz	65.48 m	Jürgen Schult; Schweriner SC	63.28 m	Michael Möllenbeck; Eintracht Frankfurt	61.72 m
Hammer throw	Jörn Hübner; LC Cottbus	72.62 m	Karsten Kobs; LG Olympia Dortmund	72.50 m	Claus Dethloff; LG Bayer Leverkusen	71.26 m
Javelin throw	Raymond Hecht; TV Wattenscheid	81.88 m	Boris Henry; TV Ludweiler	80.48 m	Peter Blank; USC Mainz	80.04 m
Decathlon	Christian Schenk; USC Mainz	8109 pts	Torsten Voss; LAV Bayer Uerdingen / Dormagen	8074 pts	Thorsten Dauth; TV Heppenheim	7985 pts
Decathlon team	USC Mainz; Christian Schenk; Udo Jacobasch; Christian Betzle	22.377 pts	LAC Quelle Fürth / München; Peter Neumaier; Norbert Demmel; Helmut Haas	22.285 pts	TV Norden; Frank Müller; Robert Kleemann; Gerd Zander	21.778 pts
Cross country short course – 2.8 km	Ralf Dahmen; LG Bayer Leverkusen	7:51 min	Stephan Kabat; SCC Berlin	7:56 min	Rüdiger Stenzel; TV Wattenscheid	7:56 min
Cross country short course, Team	SCC Berlin; Stephan Kabat; Olaf Beyer; Jens Joppich	23	TV Wattenscheid; Rüdiger Stenzel; Stephan Plätzer; H. Schulze	39	LAC Quelle Fürth / München; Hubert Karl; Klaus-Peter Nabein; Dieter Deininger	51
Cross country long course – 12.4 km	Stephan Freigang; LC Cottbus	37:53 min	Rainer Wachenbrunner; Berliner SC	37:56 min	Jens Wilky; LG Olympia Dortmund	38:37 min
Cross country long course, Team	SV Saar 05 Saarbrücken; Markus Neukirch; Alfred Knickenberg; R. Müller	74	LG Wipperfürth; Robert Langfeld; Jörg Haarmann; Olaf Kästner	90	LG Olympia Dortmund; Jens Wilky; Kasper; Michael Kluwe	113
Mountain running	Guido Dold; LC Breisgau	46:40 min	Dirk Debertin; LC Breisgau	47:59 min	Philipp Kehl; SVO Germaringen	48:03 min
Mountain running	LC Breisgau; Guido Dold; Dirk Debertin; Peter Fröhlich	2:25:38 h	SVO Germaringen; Philipp Kehl; Martin Sambale; Reinhard Mayer	2:27:08 h	LG Frankfurt; Wolfgang Münzel; Jörg Leipner; Oliver Majchrzak	2:30:48 h

=== Women ===
Event	Gold		Silver		Bronze	
100 metres	Melanie Paschke; LG Braunschweig	11.23 s	Andrea Philipp; Schweriner SC	11.51 s	Bettina Zipp; TV Schriesheim	11.53 s
200 metres	Silke-Beate Knoll; LG Olympia Dortmund	22.74 s	Melanie Paschke; LG Braunschweig	22.97 s	Silke Lichtenhagen; LG Bayer Leverkusen	23.33 s
400 metres	Anja Rücker; TuS Jena	52.43 s	Karin Janke; VfL Wolfsburg	53.13 s	Sandra Seuser; SCC Berlin	53.31 s
800 metres	Birte Bruhns; ASV Köln	2:01.73 min	Sabine Zwiener; LG VfB/Kickers Stuttgart	2:01.88 min	Christine Wachtel; SC Empor Rostock	2:01.90 min
1500 metres	Simone Weidner; OSC Berlin	4:15.62 min	Antje Beggerow; SC Empor Rostock	4:16.30 min	Kristina da Fonseca-Wollheim; LG Offenburg	4:17.59 min
3000 metres	Claudia Lokar; LG Olympia Dortmund	9:02.62 min	Christina Mai; LG Olympia Dortmund	9:04.02 min	Dörte Köster; SC Empor Rostock	9:04.86 min
10,000 metres	Kathrin Weßel; OSC Berlin	32:00.52 min	Claudia Dreher; LG Olympia Dortmund	32:24.74 min	Sonja Krolik; LG Bayer Leverkusen	33:40.50 min
Half marathon	Birgit Jerschabek; LG Sieg	1:14:08 h	Claudia Metzner; TV Wattenscheid	1:14:25 h	Jutta Karsch; LG Olympia Dortmund	1:14:41 h
Half marathon team	LG Sieg; Birgit Jerschabek; Manuela Veith; Hildegard Mockenhaupt	3:55:34 h	Starlight Team Essen 91; Martina Weise; Anke Bauer; Ayla Tosun	4:10:41 h	SV Saar 05 Saarbrücken; Bärbel Zeeb; Isabelle Müller; Steffi Hertel	4:11:05 h
Marathon	Birgit Jerschabek; LG Sieg	2:30:34 h	Andrea Fleischer; TuS Jena	2:37:11 h	Sigrid Wulsch; LG Menden	2:43:19 h
Marathon team	LG Sieg; Birgit Jerschabek; Hildegard Mockenhaupt; Josefa Matheis	8:30:14 h	TV Geiselhöring 1862; Traudi Haselbeck; Heidemarie Stalla; Ilse Rühlemann	8:47:10 h	LAV Bayer Uerdingen / Dormagen; Sigrid Altmeyer; Petra Sander; Petra Bauer	9:03:19 h
100 kilometres	Birgit Lennartz-Lohrengel; LG Sieg	7:46:44 h	Iris Reuter; TVDÄ Hanau	7:50:57 h	Jutta Philippin; SpVgg Renningen	7:56:55 h
100 kilometres team	DLC Aachen; Antje Küpper; Maria Theißen; Irene Franken	26:49:16 h	SCC Berlin; Helga Backhaus; Christl Heine; Sigrid Eichner	27:16:40 h	Only two team entrants	
100 m hurdles	Kristin Patzwahl; LAC Halensee Berlin	12.98 s	Caren Jung; MTG Mannheim	13.30 s	Sabine Braun; TV Wattenscheid	13.38 s
400 m hurdles	Silvia Rieger; TuS Eintracht Hinte	55.42 s	Heike Meißner; Dresdner SC	55.54 s	Linda Kisabaka; LG Bayer Leverkusen	56.17 s
4 × 100 m relay	LG Bayer Leverkusen; Kerstin Reuter; Silke Lichtenhagen; Stefanie Hütz; Anke Feller	44.76 s	LG Olympia Dortmund; Tielkes; Martina Kersting; Mirja Knuth; Silke-Beate Knoll	45.35 s	LG Wipperfürth; Katrin Blankenburg; Christina Hormann; Katrin Herbeck; Ingeborg Leschnik	45.47 s
4 × 400 m relay	LG Olympia Dortmund; Sandra Kuschmann; Helga Arendt; Silvia Steimle; Silke-Beate Knoll	3:33.89 min	LG Offenburg; Bettina Kersten; Christine Wahl; Simone Geist; Ulrike Heinz	3:36.66 min	OSC Berlin; Jana Schönenberger; Marlies Keil; Marion Zillwich-Scholz; Simone Weidner	3:41.17 min
3 × 800 m relay	SCC Berlin; Carmen Wüstenhagen; Katje Hoffmann; Kati Kovacs	6:19.04 min	OSC Berlin; Cornelia Bahls; Marlies Keil; Simone Weidner	6:23.63 min	LAC Quelle Fürth / München; Christine Stief; Ute Haak; Sabine Leist	6:30.60 min
5000 m walk	Beate Anders; LAC Halensee Berlin	20:55.75 min	Kathrin Born; OSC Potsdam	21:49.33 min	Sandy Leddin; TSV Erfurt	22:32.56 min
10 km walk	Beate Anders; LAC Halensee Berlin	43:12 min	Kathrin Born; OSC Potsdam	45:13 min	Simone Thust; LAC Halensee Berlin	46:40 min
10 km walk team	LAC Halensee Berlin; Beate Anders; Simone Thust; Sandra Priemer	2:19:52 h	Berliner SC; Doreen Sellenriek; Helge Will; Yvonne Anders	2:30:22 h	LSG Aalen; Brigitte Buck; Christine Stegmaier; Insa Franke	2:35:35 h
High jump	Heike Henkel; LG Bayer Leverkusen	2.00 m	Heike Balck; Schweriner SC	1.92 m	Andrea Baumert; SCC Berlin	1.88 m
Pole vault	Carmen Haage; LG Herlazhofen/Diepoldshofen	3.85 m	Tanja Cors; MTV Holzminden	3.75 m	Andrea Müller; LAZ Zweibrücken	3.55 m
Long jump	Susen Tiedtke; Berliner SC	6.77 m	Helga Radtke; SC Empor Rostock	6.53 m	Katrin Bartschat; TK Hannover	6.40 m
Triple jump	Helga Radtke; SC Empor Rostock	14.05 m	Petra Laux; LAG Siegen	13.61 m	Anja Vokuhl; SC Magdeburg	13.57 m
Shot put	Kathrin Neimke; SC Magdeburg	19.56 m	Stephanie Storp; VfL Wolfsburg	19.53 m	Astrid Kumbernuss; SC Neubrandenburg	19.09 m
Discus throw	Anja Gündler; OSC Berlin	61.84 m	Franka Dietzsch; SC Neubrandenburg	60.70 m	Astrid Kumbernuss; SC Neubrandenburg	59.64 m
Hammer throw	Simone Mathes; UAC Kulmbach	53.36 m	Marion Große; ASV Köln	50.60 m	Angelika Lindemann; LG Frankfurt	50.22 m
Javelin throw	Silke Renk; SV Halle	65.46 m	Steffi Nerius; LG Bayer Leverkusen	63.88 m	Karen Forkel; SV Halle	62.84 m
Heptathlon	Birgit Clarius; LAC Quelle Fürth	6500 pts	Birgit Gautzsch; Schweriner SC	6181 pts	Bettina Braag; LG Bayer Leverkusen	6083 pts
Heptathlon team	LG Bayer Leverkusen; Bettina Braag; Silke Knut; Anke Straschewski	17.270 pts	LAC Quelle Fürth; Birgit Clarius; Sabine Schwarz; Heike Blassnek	17.182 pts	OSC Berlin; Marion Scholz; Micheline Borchert; Sylvana Finke	16.280 pts
Cross country short course – 2.8 km	Claudia Metzner; TV Wattenscheid	9:01 min	Katrin Wolf; LAC Quelle Fürth	9:05 min	Annette Hüls; LG Bayer Leverkusen	9:07 min
Cross country short course, Team	LAC Quelle Fürth / München; Katrin Wolf; Ute Haak; Vera Michallek	11	LG Bayer Leverkusen; Annette Hüls; Katja Steinmetz; Susanne Hüls	21	LG Braunschweig; Doris Grossert; Katrin Bröger; Kratz	47
Cross country long course – 7.6 km	Claudia Dreher; LG Olympia Dortmund	25:52 min	Birgit Jerschabek; LG Sieg	26:09 min	Claudia Lokar; LG Olympia Dortmund	26:38 min
Cross country long course, Team	LG Olympia Dortmund; Claudia Dreher; Claudia Lokar; Antje Pohlmann	13	SV Saar 05 Saarbrücken; Bärbel Zeeb; Nicole Frank; Steffi Hertel	53	LAV Bayer Uerdingen / Dormagen; Petra Sander; Sigrid Altmeyer; Petra Bauer	53
Mountain running	Birgit Lennartz-Lohrengel; LG Sieg	57:29 min	Johanna Baumgartner; LAC Quelle Fürth / München	57:48 min	Sonja Ambrosy; LC Breisgau	59:23 min
Mountain running	LC Breisgau; Sonja Ambrosy; Barbara Guerike; Monika Imgraben	3:06:08 h	LAC Quelle Fürth / München; Johanna Baumgartner; Silke Hennersdorf; Marion Rupprich	3:31:53 h	TSV Burghaslach; Fischer; Dagmar Weinländer; Dölle	3:33:01 h
