= Germany at the 1991 World Championships in Athletics =

Germany at the 1991 World Athletics Championships
- Flag of Germany
- WA code: GER
- National federation: German Athletics Association
- Website: leichtathletik.de (in German)

in Tokyo, Japan 23 August – 1 September 1991
- Competitors: 91 (44 men and 47 women)
- Medals Ranked 3rd: Gold 5 Silver 4 Bronze 8 Total 17

World Athletics Championships appearances (overview)
- 1991; 1993; 1995; 1997; 1999; 2001; 2003; 2005; 2007; 2009; 2011; 2013; 2015; 2017; 2019; 2022; 2023; 2025

Germany competed at the 1991 World Championships in Athletics in Tokyo, Japan, from 23 August to 1 September 1991. The German Athletics Association nominated 91 athletes.

== Medalists ==
| Medal | Athlete | Event | Date |
|---|---|---|---|
| Gold | Katrin Krabbe | 100 metres | 27 August |
| Gold | Sabine Braun | Heptathlon | 27 August |
| Gold | Lars Riedel | Discus throw | 27 August |
| Gold | Katrin Krabbe | 200 metres | 30 August |
| Gold | Heike Henkel | High jump | 31 August |
| Silver | Heike Drechsler | Long jump | 25 August |
| Silver | Grit Breuer | 400 metres | 27 August |
| Silver | Ilke Wyludda | Discus throw | 31 August |
| Silver | Petra Felke | Javelin throw | 1 September |
| Bronze | Katrin Dörre | Marathon | 25 August |
| Bronze | Heinz Weis | Hammer throw | 25 August |
| Bronze | Christian Schenk | Decathlon | 30 August |
| Bronze | Hartwig Gauder | 50 kilometres walk | 31 August |
| Bronze | Hauke Fuhlbrügge | 1500 metres | 1 September |
| Bronze | Grit Breuer; Heike Drechsler; Katrin Krabbe; Sabine Richter | 4 × 100 metres relay | 1 September |
| Bronze | Grit Breuer; Annet Hesselbarth (*); Katrin Krabbe; Uta Rohländer; Katrin Schreiter (*); Christine Wachtel | 4 × 400 metres relay | 1 September |
| Bronze | Silke Renk | Javelin throw | 1 September |

== Results ==
=== Men ===
Track and road events

| Athlete | Event | Heat Round ! | | Heat Round 2 | | Semifinal | | Final | |
| Athlete | Event | Result | Rank | Result | Rank | Result | Rank | Result | Rank |
|---|---|---|---|---|---|---|---|---|---|
| Steffen Bringmann | 100 metres | 10.47 | 31 | did not advance | | | | | |
| Jens Carlowitz | 400 metres | 45.78 | 8 Q | 45.68 | 14 | did not advance | | | |
| Joachim Dehmel | 800 metres | 1:46.24 | 5 q | — | | 1:47.91 | 13 | did not advance | |
| Hauke Fuhlbrügge | 1500 metres | 3:38.65 | 6 Q | — | | 3:41.41 | 8 q | 3:35.28 | 3rd place, bronze medalist(s) |
| Jens-Peter Herold | 1500 metres | 3:41.21 | 11 Q | — | | 3:41.23 | 6 Q | 3:35.37 | 4 |
| Dieter Baumann | 5000 metres | 13:54.07 | 9 Q | — | | | | 13:28.67 | 4 |
| Stéphane Franke | 10,000 metres | 28:30.13 | 17 q | — | | | | 28:20.00 | 12 |
| Konrad Dobler | Marathon | — | | | | | | 2:19:01 | 10 |
| Stephan Freigang | Marathon | — | | | | | | 2:23:13 | 18 |
| Jörg Peter | Marathon | — | | | | | | DNF | |
| Mike Fenner | 110 metres hurdles | 13.78 | 26 | — | | did not advance | | | |
| Dietmar Koszewski | 110 metres hurdles | 13.67 | 16 | — | | did not advance | | | |
| Florian Schwarthoff | 110 metres hurdles | 13.39 | 7 Q | — | | 13.41 | 6 Q | 13.41 | 7 |
| Michael Grün | 400 metres hurdles | 50.30 | 24 | — | | did not advance | | | |
| Olaf Hense | 400 metres hurdles | 50.44 | 25 | — | | did not advance | | | |
| Carsten Köhrbrück | 400 metres hurdles | 50.88 | 29 | — | | did not advance | | | |
| Hagen Melzer | 3000 metres steeplechase | 8:28.56 | 15 q | — | | | | 8:45.58 | 12 |
| Robert Ihly | 20 kilometres walk | — | | | | | | 1:20:52 | 6 |
| Axel Noack | 20 kilometres walk | — | | | | | | 1:21:35 | 11 |
| Ronald Weigel | 20 kilometres walk | — | | | | | | 1:22:18 | 16 |
| Hartwig Gauder | 50 kilometres walk | — | | | | | | 3:55:14 | 3rd place, bronze medalist(s) |
| Torsten Trampeli | 50 kilometres walk | — | | | | | | 4:27:23 | 19 |
| Ronald Weigel | 50 kilometres walk | — | | | | | | DNF | |
| Steffen Bringmann; Steffen Görmer; Wolfgang Haupt; Florian Schwarthoff | 4 × 100 metres relay | DQ | | — | | | | did not advance | |
| Jens Carlowitz; Norbert Dobeleit; Klaus Just; Rico Lieder | 4 × 400 metres relay | 3:00.17 | 5 q | — | | | | 3:00.75 | 6 |

Field events

| Athlete | Event | Qualification | | Final | |
| Athlete | Event | Distance | Position | Distance | Position |
|---|---|---|---|---|---|
| Bernhard Zintl | Pole vault | 5.50 | 5 q | 5.50 | 9 |
| Dietmar Haaf | Long jump | 8.21 | 2 Q | 8.22 | 4 |
| André Müller | Long jump | 8.04 | 8 q | 7.94 | 10 |
| Ralf Jaros | Triple jump | 16.88 | 10 q | 16.76 | 9 |
| Oliver-Sven Buder | Shot put | 19.44 | 7 q | 20.10 | 4 |
| Kalman Konya | Shot put | 18.26 | 18 | did not advance | |
| Lars Riedel | Discus throw | 65.30 | 1 Q | 66.20 | 1st place, gold medalist(s) |
| Wolfgang Schmidt | Discus throw | 65.18 | 2 Q | 64.76 | 4 |
| Jürgen Schult | Discus throw | 62.56 | 9 q | 63.12 | 6 |
| Peter Blank | Javelin throw | 82.56 | 3 Q | 72.62 | 11 |
| Raymond Hecht | Javelin throw | 81.92 | 7 q | 70.58 | 12 |
| Klaus Tafelmeier | Javelin throw | 72.42 | 33 | did not advance | |
| Claus Dethloff | Hammer throw | 73.54 | 10 q | 72.96 | 10 |
| Heinz Weis | Hammer throw | 74.40 | 9 q | 80.44 | 3rd place, bronze medalist(s) |

Combined events – Decathlon

| Athlete | Event | 100 m | LJ | SP | HJ | 400 m | 110H | DT | PV | JT | 1500 m | Final | Rank |
|---|---|---|---|---|---|---|---|---|---|---|---|---|---|
| Thorsten Dauth | Result | 10.74 | 6.99 | 15.36 | 2.03 | 48.13 | 14.88 | 42.96 | 4.30 | 60.46 | 4:28.09 | 8069 | 10 |
| Thorsten Dauth | Points | 919 | 811 | 812 | 831 | 903 | 864 | 725 | 702 | 745 | 757 | 8069 | 10 |
| Michael Kohnle | Result | 10.90 | 7.52 | 14.47 | 2.03 | 49.63 | 14.57 | 42.28 | 4.70 | 58.68 | 4:51.98 | 8000 | 12 |
| Michael Kohnle | Points | 883 | 940 | 757 | 831 | 832 | 902 | 711 | 819 | 718 | 607 | 8000 | 12 |
| Christian Schenk | Result | 11.34 | 7.55 | 15.77 | 2.18 | 50.10 | 15.26 | 45.98 | 4.90 | 61.98 | 4:22.58 | 8394 | 3rd place, bronze medalist(s) |
| Christian Schenk | Points | 780 | 947 | 837 | 973 | 810 | 818 | 787 | 880 | 768 | 794 | 8394 | 3rd place, bronze medalist(s) |

=== Women ===
Track and road events

| Athlete | Event | Heat Round ! | | Heat Round 2 | | Semifinal | | Final | |
| Athlete | Event | Result | Rank | Result | Rank | Result | Rank | Result | Rank |
|---|---|---|---|---|---|---|---|---|---|
| Katrin Krabbe | 100 metres | 11.23 | 6 Q | 10.91 | 2 Q | 10.94 | 3 Q | 10.99 | 1st place, gold medalist(s) |
| Andrea Philipp | 100 metres | 11.72 | 28 Q | 11.80 | 28 | did not advance | | | |
| Sabine Richter | 100 metres | 11.64 | 24 q | 11.66 | 24 | did not advance | | | |
| Silke-Beate Knoll | 200 metres | 23.09 | 3 Q | 22.97 | 9 Q | 23.49 | 10 | did not advance | |
| Katrin Krabbe | 200 metres | 23.23 | 8 Q | 22.46 | 1 Q | 22.30 | 1 Q | 22.09 | 1st place, gold medalist(s) |
| Grit Breuer | 400 metres | 52.56 | 10 Q | 52.16 | 13 Q | 50.14 | 2 Q | 49.42 | 2nd place, silver medalist(s) |
| Karin Janke | 400 metres | 53.73 | 23 Q | 53.08 | 18 | did not advance | | | |
| Birthe Bruhns | 800 metres | 2:00.11 | 1 Q | — | | 1:59.93 | 5 | did not advance | |
| Sigrun Grau | 800 metres | 2:00.99 | 5 q | — | | DNS | | did not advance | |
| Christine Wachtel | 800 metres | 2:01.45 | 9 Q | — | | 1:59.10 | 1 Q | 1:58.90 | 6 |
| Ellen Kießling | 1500 metres | 4:09.23 | 16 Q | — | | | | 4:04.75 | 5 |
| Yvonne Mai | 1500 metres | 4:06.09 | 6 q | — | | | | 4:07.45 | 13 |
| Anke Schäning | 3000 metres | 8:56.02 | 12 | — | | | | did not advance | |
| Claudia Dreher | 10,000 metres | 32:44.94 | 32 | — | | | | did not advance | |
| Uta Pippig | 10,000 metres | 32:00.76 | 17 Q | — | | | | 31:55.68 | 6 |
| Kathrin Weßel | 10,000 metres | 31:54.05 | 5 Q | — | | | | 31:38.96 | 4 |
| Iris Biba | Marathon | — | | | | | | 2:33:48 | 9 |
| Katrin Dörre | Marathon | — | | | | | | 2:30:10 | 3rd place, bronze medalist(s) |
| Cornelia Oschkenat | 100 metres hurdles | 13.55 | 28 | — | | did not advance | | | |
| Kristin Patzwahl | 100 metres hurdles | 13.08 | 7 q | — | | 13.11 | 9 Q | 13.07 | 8 |
| Gloria Siebert | 100 metres hurdles | 13.29 | 16 | — | | did not advance | | | |
| Gudrun Abt | 400 metres hurdles | 56.16 | 14 q | — | | 56.17 | 15 | did not advance | |
| Sabine Busch | 400 metres hurdles | 56.37 | 16 q | — | | 55.93 | 14 | did not advance | |
| Heike Meißner | 400 metres hurdles | 56.00 | 12 Q | — | | 54.77 | 7 Q | 55.26 | 7 |
| Beate Anders | 10 kilometres walk | — | | | | | | 44:35 | 10 |
| Kathrin Born | 10 kilometres walk | — | | | | | | 44:39 | 11 |
| Andrea Meloni | 10 kilometres walk | — | | | | | | 46:23 | 23 |
| Grit Breuer; Heike Drechsler; Katrin Krabbe; Sabine Richter | 4 × 100 metres relay | 41.91 | 1 Q | — | | | | 42.33 | 3rd place, bronze medalist(s) |
| Grit Breuer; Annet Hesselbarth (*); Katrin Krabbe; Uta Rohländer; Katrin Schreiter (*); Christine Wachtel | 4 × 400 metres relay | 3:25.93 | 4 Q | — | | | | 3:21.25 | 3rd place, bronze medalist(s) |

Field events

| Athlete | Event | Qualification | | Final | |
| Athlete | Event | Distance | Position | Distance | Position |
|---|---|---|---|---|---|
| Heike Balck | High jump | 1.88 | 10 q | 1.84 | 12 |
| Heike Henkel | High jump | 1.90 | 2 q | 2.05 | 1st place, gold medalist(s) |
| Birgit Kähler | High jump | 1.90 | 5 q | 1.93 | 5 |
| Heike Drechsler | High jump | 6.87 | 2 Q | 7.29 | 2nd place, silver medalist(s) |
| Helga Radtke | High jump | 6.62 | 13 | did not advance | |
| Susen Tiedtke | High jump | 6.85 | 4 Q | 6.77 | 5 |
| Claudia Losch | Shot put | 18.83 | 5 Q | 19.74 | 4 |
| Kathrin Neimke | Shot put | 18.59 | 8 Q | 18.83 | 8 |
| Stephanie Storp | Shot put | 19.52 | 2 Q | 19.50 | 6 |
| Franka Dietzsch | Discus throw | 59.16 | 13 | did not advance | |
| Martina Hellmann | Discus throw | 65.26 | 3 Q | 67.14 | 4 |
| Ilke Wyludda | Discus throw | 67.72 | 1 Q | 69.12 | 2nd place, silver medalist(s) |
| Petra Felke | Javelin throw | 67.24 | 2 Q | 68.68 | 2nd place, silver medalist(s) |
| Karen Forkel | Javelin throw | 68.14 | 1 Q | 57.90 | 12 |
| Silke Renk | Javelin throw | 65.24 | 5 Q | 66.80 | 3rd place, bronze medalist(s) |

Combined events – Heptathlon

| Athlete | Event | 100H | HJ | SP | 200 m | LJ | JT | 800 m | Final | Rank |
|---|---|---|---|---|---|---|---|---|---|---|
| Peggy Beer | Result | 13.41 | 1.79 | 12.97 | 24.25 | 6.34 | 43.66 | 2:09.32 | 6380 | 7 |
| Peggy Beer | Points | 1063 | 966 | 725 | 957 | 956 | 738 | 975 | 6380 | 7 |
| Sabine Braun | Result | 13.32 | 1.91 | 13.62 | 24.49 | 6.67 | 48.66 | 2:16.09 | 6672 | 1st place, gold medalist(s) |
| Sabine Braun | Points | 1077 | 1119 | 769 | 934 | 1062 | 834 | 877 | 6672 | 1st place, gold medalist(s) |
| Heike Tischler | Result | 13.96 | 1.76 | 14.00 | 24.63 | DNS | DNF | | | |
| Heike Tischler | Points | 984 | 928 | 794 | 921 | 0 | DNF | | | |
