= Germany at the 1995 World Championships in Athletics =

Germany at the 1995 World Athletics Championships
- Flag of Germany
- WA code: GER
- National federation: German Athletics Association
- Website: leichtathletik.de (in German)

in Gothenburg, Sweden 5–13 August 1995
- Medals Ranked 3rd: Gold 2 Silver 2 Bronze 2 Total 6

World Athletics Championships appearances (overview)
- 1991; 1993; 1995; 1997; 1999; 2001; 2003; 2005; 2007; 2009; 2011; 2013; 2015; 2017; 2019; 2022; 2023; 2025

Germany competed at the 1995 World Championships in Athletics in Stuttgart, Germany from 5 to 13 August 1995. The German Athletics Association nominated athletes.

== Medalists ==
| Medal | Athlete | Event | Date |
|---|---|---|---|
| Gold | Astrid Kumbernuss | Women's shot put | 5 August |
| Gold | Lars Riedel | Men's discus throw | 11 August |
| Silver | Ilke Wyludda | Women's discus throw | 12 August |
| Silver | Alina Astafei | Women's high jump | 13 August |
| Bronze | Gabriele Becker; Silke-Beate Knoll; Silke Lichtenhagen; Melanie Paschke | Women's 4 × 100 metres relay | 13 August |
| Bronze | Boris Henry | Men's javelin throw | 13 August |

== Results ==
=== Men ===
Track and road events

| Athlete | Event | Heat Round 1 | | Heat Round 2 | | Semifinal | | Final | |
| Athlete | Event | Result | Rank | Result | Rank | Result | Rank | Result | Rank |
|---|---|---|---|---|---|---|---|---|---|
| Marc Blume | 100 metres | 10.39 | 28 Q | 10.40 | 28 | did not advance | | | |
| Marc Blume | 200 metres | 20.86 | 34 | did not advance | | | | | |
| Robert Kurnicki | 200 metres | 20.61 | 9 Q | 20.67 | 19 | did not advance | | | |
| Alexander Lack | 200 metres | 20.97 | 39 | did not advance | | | | | |
| Nico Motchebon | 800 metres | 1:46.14 | 1 Q | —N/a | | 1:47.96 | 2 Q | 1:45.97 | 4 |
| Jens-Peter Herold | 1500 metres | 3:49.24 | 38 | —N/a | | did not advance | | | |
| Rüdiger Stenzel | 1500 metres | 3:40.65 | 25 | —N/a | | Did not advance | | | |
| Dieter Baumann | 5000 metres | 13:30.59 | 12 Q | —N/a | | | | 13:39.98 | 8 |
| Stéphane Franke | 10,000 metres | 27:50.93 | 9 q | —N/a | | | | 27:48.88 | 7 |
| Stephan Freigang | 10,000 metres | 28:17.04 | 22 | —N/a | | | | Did not advance | |
| Konrad Dobler | Marathon | —N/a | | | | | | 2:18:09 | 14 |
| Rainer Wachenbrunner | Marathon | —N/a | | | | | | DNF | |
| Sven Göhler | 110 metres hurdles | 13.74 | 22 q | DNF | | did not advance | | | |
| Eric Kaiser | 110 metres hurdles | 13.63 | 14 Q | 13.50 | 10 Q | 13.71 | 14 | Did not advance | |
| Florian Schwarthoff | 110 metres hurdles | 13.45 | 4 Q | 13.24 | 2 Q | DNF | | Did not advance | |
| Olaf Hense | 400 metres hurdles | 52.35 | 45 | —N/a | | did not advance | | | |
| Michael Kaul | 400 metres hurdles | 50.23 | 27 | —N/a | | Did not advance | | | |
| Stephan Striezel | 400 metres hurdles | 51.65 | 40 | —N/a | | Did not advance | | | |
| Kim Bauermeister | 3000 metres steeplechase | 8:29.05 | 21 Q | —N/a | | 8:45.27 | 21 | did not advance | |
| Steffen Brand | 3000 metres steeplechase | 8:26.45 | 16 Q | —N/a | | 8:26.35 | 9 Q | 8:14.37 | 4 |
| Martin Strege | 3000 metres steeplechase | 8:24.18 | 6 Q | —N/a | | 8:22.33 | 7 q | 8:18.57 | 8 |
| Nichan Daimer | 20 kilometres walk | —N/a | | | | | | 1:24:17 | 12 |
| Robert Ihly | 20 kilometres walk | —N/a | | | | | | 1:24:40 | 14 |
| Axel Noack | 50 kilometres walk | —N/a | | | | | | 3:55:51 | 13 |
| Ronald Weigel | 50 kilometres walk | —N/a | | | | | | DQ | |
| Marc Blume; Christian Konieczny; Michael Huke; Robert Kurnicki; Holger Blume | 4 × 100 metres relay | 39.06 | 11 q | —N/a | | 38.90 | 11 | Did not advance | |
| Uwe Jahn; Rico Lieder; Karsten Just; Kai Karsten | 4 × 400 metres relay | 3:00.25 | 3 q | —N/a | | | | DQ | |

Field events

| Athlete | Event | Qualification | | Final | |
| Athlete | Event | Distance | Position | Distance | Position |
|---|---|---|---|---|---|
| Wolf-Hendrik Beyer | High jump | 2.24 | 17 | did not advance | |
| Wolfgang Kreißig | High jump | 2.24 | 19 | Did not advance | |
| Ralf Sonn | High jump | 2.20 | 30 | Did not advance | |
| Tim Lobinger | Pole vault | 5.65 | 11 q | 5.40 | 11 |
| Andrei Tivontschik | Pole vault | 5.65 | 5 q | 5.60 | 9 |
| Georg Ackermann | Long jump | 8.15 | 5 Q | 8.14 | 4 |
| Konstantin Krause | Long jump | 7.68 | 24 | did not advance | |
| Oliver-Sven Buder | Shot put | 19.91 | 5 Q | 20.11 | 6 |
| Thorsten Herbrand | Shot put | 18.30 | 24 | Did not advance | |
| Jonny Reinhardt | Shot put | 18.89 | 14 | Did not advance | |
| Michael Möllenbeck | Discus throw | 59.76 | 16 | Did not advance | |
| Lars Riedel | Discus throw | 63.64 | 3 Q | 68.76 CR | 1st place, gold medalist(s) |
| Jürgen Schult | Discus throw | 61.92 | 7 q | 64.44 | 5 |
| Raymond Hecht | Javelin throw | 79.82 | 10 q | 83.30 | 4 |
| Boris Henry | Javelin throw | 87.60 | 2 Q | 86.08 | 3rd place, bronze medalist(s) |
| Andreas Linden | Javelin throw | 80.16 | 9 q | 80.76 | 8 |
| Claus Dethloff | Hammer throw | 69.64 | 27 | did not advance | |
| Karsten Kobs | Hammer throw | 72.96 | 16 | Did not advance | |
| Heinz Weis | Hammer throw | DNS | | Did not advance | |

Combined events – Decathlon

| Athlete | Event | 100 m | LJ | SP | HJ | 400 m | 110H | DT | PV | JT | 1500 m | Final | Rank |
|---|---|---|---|---|---|---|---|---|---|---|---|---|---|
| Thorsten Dauth | Result | 11.10 | 6.72 | 15.16 | 1.86 | DNF | | | | | | | |
| Thorsten Dauth | Points | 838 | 748 | 800 | 679 | DNF | | | | | | | |
| Michael Kohnle | Result | 11.24 | 7.49 | 15.35 | 1.98 | DQ | DNF | | | | | | |
| Michael Kohnle | Points | 808 | 932 | 811 | 785 | 0 | DNF | | | | | | |
| Paul Meier | Result | 11.51 | 7.11 | 14.33 | DNF | | | | | | | | |
| Paul Meier | Points | 750 | 840 | 749 | DNF | | | | | | | | |

=== Women ===
Track and road events

| Athlete | Event | Heat Round 1 | | Heat Round 2 | | Semifinal | | Final | |
| Athlete | Event | Result | Rank | Result | Rank | Result | Rank | Result | Rank |
|---|---|---|---|---|---|---|---|---|---|
| Gabriele Becker | 100 metres | 11.54 | 30 q | 11.54 | 27 | Did not advance | | | |
| Melanie Paschke | 100 metres | 11.15 | 3 Q | 11.27 | 11 Q | 11.13 | 6 Q | 11.10 | 6 |
| Andrea Philipp | 100 metres | 11.66 | 39 | Did not advance | | | | | |
| Silke-Beate Knoll | 200 metres | 22.46 | 2 Q | —N/a | | 22.57 | 5 Q | 22.66 | 5 |
| Silke Lichtenhagen | 200 metres | 23.19 | 23 | —N/a | | Did not advance | | | |
| Melanie Paschke | 200 metres | 22.81 | 11 q | —N/a | | 22.60 | 7 Q | 22.60 | 4 |
| Linda Kisabaka | 400 metres | 51.96 | 28 | —N/a | | Did not advance | | | |
| Sandra Kuschmann | 400 metres | 51.99 | 29 | —N/a | | Did not advance | | | |
| Uta Rohländer | 400 metres | 51.68 | 24 q | —N/a | | 51.99 | 20 | Did not advance | |
| Anne Bruns | 800 metres | 2:03.16 | 25 | —N/a | | Did not advance | | | |
| Andrea Karhoff | 5000 metres | 16:02.26 | 34 | —N/a | | | | Did not advance | |
| Monika Schäfer | 5000 metres | DNF | | —N/a | | | | Did not advance | |
| Kathrin Weßel | 10,000 metres | 32:46.51 | 19 q | —N/a | | | | 31:55.04 | 10 |
| Birgit Jerschabek | Marathon | —N/a | | | | | | DNF | |
| Sonja Oberem | Marathon | —N/a | | | | | | 2:32:17 | 8 |
| Heike Blaßneck | 100 metres hurdles | 13.47 | 27 | —N/a | | Did not advance | | | |
| Birgit Hamann | 100 metres hurdles | 13.21 | 20 | —N/a | | Did not advance | | | |
| Caren Jung | 100 metres hurdles | 13.13 | 17 | —N/a | | Did not advance | | | |
| Heike Meißner | 400 metres hurdles | 55.95 | 5 Q | —N/a | | 56.75 | 8 Q | 54.86 | 4 |
| Silvia Rieger | 400 metres hurdles | 55.75 | 4 Q | —N/a | | 55.69 | 4 Q | 55.01 | 6 |
| Kathrin Boyde | 10 kilometres walk | —N/a | | | | | | DQ | |
| Beate Gummelt | 10 kilometres walk | —N/a | | | | | | 43:15 | 10 |
| Simone Thust | 10 kilometres walk | —N/a | | | | | | 45:24 | 29 |
| Gabriele Becker; Silke-Beate Knoll; Silke Lichtenhagen; Melanie Paschke | 4 × 100 metres relay | 42.83 | 6 Q | —N/a | | | | 43.01 | 3rd place, bronze medalist(s) |
| Karin Janke; Linda Kisabaka; Sandra Kuschmann; Uta Rohländer | 4 × 400 metres relay | 3:23.84 | 4 Q | —N/a | | | | 3:26.10 | 4 |

Field events

| Athlete | Event | Qualification | | Final | |
| Athlete | Event | Distance | Position | Distance | Position |
|---|---|---|---|---|---|
| Alina Astafei | High jump | 1.95 | 1 Q | 1.99 | 2nd place, silver medalist(s) |
| Heike Balck | High jump | 1.80 | 33 | did not advance | |
| Heike Henkel | High jump | 1.93 | 15 | Did not advance | |
| Heike Drechsler | Long jump | 6.70 | 6 q' | 6.64 | 9 |
| Claudia Gerhardt | Long jump | 6.40 | 23 | did not advance | |
| Ramona Molzan | Triple jump | 13.90 | 15 | did not advance | |
| Astrid Kumbernuss | Shot put | 19.83 | 1 Q | 21.22 | 1st place, gold medalist(s) |
| Kathrin Neimke | Shot put | 19.07 | 2 Q | 19.30 | 4 |
| Stephanie Storp | Shot put | 18.36 | 10 q | 18.81 | 8 |
| Franka Dietzsch | Discus throw | 59.78 | 12 q | 61.28 | 7 |
| Jana Laurén | Discus throw | 59.56 | 13 | Did not advance | |
| Ilke Wyludda | Discus throw | 65.24 | 1 Q | 67.20 | 2nd place, silver medalist(s) |
| Tanja Damaske | Javelin throw | 62.82 | 2 Q | 62.32 | 6 |
| Steffi Nerius | Javelin throw | 62.62 | 3 Q | 56.50 | 11 |
| Silke Renk | Javelin throw | 58.86 | 14 | Did not advance | |

Combined events – Heptathlon

| Athlete | Event | 100H | HJ | SP | 200 m | LJ | JT | 800 m | Final | Rank |
|---|---|---|---|---|---|---|---|---|---|---|
| Peggy Beer | Result | 13.88 | 1.74 | 13.24 | 24.88 | 4.08 | DNF | | | |
| Peggy Beer | Points | 995 | 903 | 743 | 898 | 326 | DNF | | | |
| Sabine Braun | Result | 13.41 | 1.80 | DNF | | | | | | |
| Sabine Braun | Points | 1063 | 978 | DNF | | | | | | |
| Heike Drechsler | Result | 13.86 | 1.80 | 13.12 | DNF | | | | | |
| Heike Drechsler | Points | 998 | 978 | 735 | DNF | | | | | |
