= Germany at the 1993 World Championships in Athletics =

Germany at the 1993 World Athletics Championships
- Flag of Germany
- WA code: GER
- National federation: German Athletics Association
- Website: leichtathletik.de (in German)

in Stuttgart, Germany 13–22 August 1991
- Medals Ranked 6th: Gold 2 Silver 2 Bronze 4 Total 8

World Athletics Championships appearances (overview)
- 1991; 1993; 1995; 1997; 1999; 2001; 2003; 2005; 2007; 2009; 2011; 2013; 2015; 2017; 2019; 2022; 2023

Germany competed at the 1993 World Championships in Athletics in Stuttgart, Germany from 13 to 22 August 1993. The German Athletics Association nominated athletes.

== Medalists ==
Medal	Athlete	Event	Date
Gold	Heike Drechsler	Long jump	15 August
Gold	Lars Riedel	Discus throw	17 August
Silver	Sabine Braun	Heptathlon	22 August
Silver	Karen Forkel	Javelin throw	22 August
Bronze	Kathrin Neimke	Shot put	15 August
Bronze	Jürgen Schult	Discus throw	17 August
Bronze	Paul Meier	Decathlon	20 August
Bronze	Olaf Hense; Karsten Just; Rico Lieder; Thomas Schönlebe	4 × 400 metres relay	22 August

== Results ==
=== Men ===
Track and road events

Athlete	Event	Heat Round !		Heat Round 2		Semifinal		Final	
Athlete	Event	Result	Rank	Result	Rank	Result	Rank	Result	Rank
Marc Blume	100 metres	10.36	15 Q	10.32	13	did not advance			
Michael Huke	200 metres	DSQ		did not advance					
Robert Kurnicki	200 metres	20.66	9 Q	20.58	12 Q	20.67	11	did not advance	
Björn Sinnhuber	200 metres	20.99	29	did not advance					
Rico Lieder	400 metres	46.06	17 Q	45.66	15 Q	45.75	13	did not advance	
Nico Motchebon	800 metres	1:46.94	14 q	—		1:46.58	20	did not advance	
Michael Busch	1500 metres	3:44.03	31	—		did not advance			
Jens-Peter Herold	1500 metres	3:50.64	36	—		did not advance			
Rüdiger Stenzel	1500 metres	3:40.30	17 q	—		3:42.29	12 Q	3:38.66	10
Rainer Wachenbrunner	5000 metres	13:46.43	21	—				did not advance	
Stéphane Franke	10,000 metres	28:19.11	6 Q	—				28:10.69	4
Konrad Dobler	Marathon	—						2:18:28	6
Stephan Freigang	Marathon	—						DNF	
Kurt Stenzel	Marathon	—						2:19:53	12
Eric Kaiser	110 metres hurdles	13.54	9 Q	—		13.64	15	did not advance	
Dietmar Koszewski	110 metres hurdles	13.52	6 Q	—		13.48	10 Q	13.60	7
Florian Schwarthoff	110 metres hurdles	13.60	12 Q	—		13.31	7 q	13.27	5
Olaf Hense	400 metres hurdles	49.64	13 Q	—		50.05	23	did not advance	
Kim Bauermeister	3000 metres steeplechase	8:37.41	26	—				did not advance	
Steffen Brand	3000 metres steeplechase	8:23.27	7 Q	—				8:15.33	6
Martin Strege	3000 metres steeplechase	8:21.24	4 Q	—				8:34.31	14
Robert Ihly	20 kilometres walk	—						1:24:21	7
Hartwig Gauder	50 kilometres walk	—						DNF	
Axel Noack	50 kilometres walk	—						3:43:50	4
Ronald Weigel	50 kilometres walk	—						DNF	
Marc Blume; Steffen Görmer; Michael Huke; Robert Kurnicki	4 × 100 metres relay	38.90	6 Q	—		38.58	5 Q	38.78	6
Olaf Hense; Karsten Just; Rico Lieder; Thomas Schönlebe	4 × 400 metres relay	3:01.26	3 Q	—				2:59.99	3rd place, bronze medalist(s)

Field events

Athlete	Event	Qualification		Final	
Athlete	Event	Distance	Position	Distance	Position
Wolf-Hendrik Beyer	High jump	2.25	13	did not advance	
Ralf Sonn	High jump	2.28	1 q	2.34	4
Martin Amann	Pole vault	5.55	17	did not advance	
Tim Lobinger	Pole vault	5.35	32	did not advance	
Werner Holl	Pole vault	5.25	34	did not advance	
Bernhard Kelm	Long jump	7.78	20	did not advance	
Konstantin Krause	Long jump	7.53	32	did not advance	
André Müller	Long jump	7.95	10 q	7.83	9
Ralf Jaros	Triple jump	17.18	4 Q	16.76	9
Volker Mai	Triple jump	16.33	30	did not advance	
Karsten Richter	Triple jump	16.13	32	did not advance	
Oliver-Sven Buder	Shot put	19.88	6 q	19.74	7
Jonny Reinhardt	Shot put	19.76	8 q	19.53	8
Lars Riedel	Discus throw	65.88	2 Q	67.72	1st place, gold medalist(s)
Jürgen Schult	Discus throw	62.10	7 q	66.12	3rd place, bronze medalist(s)
Peter Blank	Javelin throw	74.10	29	did not advance	
Raymond Hecht	Javelin throw	75.00	23	did not advance	
Boris Henry	Javelin throw	77.42	14	did not advance	
Karsten Kobs	Hammer throw	71.82	16	did not advance	

Combined events – Decathlon

Athlete	Event	100 m	LJ	SP	HJ	400 m	110H	DT	PV	JT	1500 m	Final	Rank
Michael Kohnle	Result	11.16	7.40	14.34	2.00	50.17	14.51	44.70	5.00	62.10	4:47.95	8075	9
Michael Kohnle	Points	825	910	749	803	807	910	761	910	769	631	8075	9
Paul Meier	Result	10.57	7.57	15.45	2.15	47.73	14.63	45.72	4.60	61.22	4:32.05	8548	3rd place, bronze medalist(s)
Paul Meier	Points	959	952	817	944	922	895	782	790	756	731	8548	3rd place, bronze medalist(s)
Christian Schenk	Result	11.22	7.63	15.72	2.15	48.78	15.29	46.94	4.80	65.32	4:24.44	8500	4
Christian Schenk	Points	812	967	834	944	872	815	807	849	818	782	8500	4

=== Women ===
Track and road events

Athlete	Event	Heat Round !		Heat Round 2		Semifinal		Final	
Athlete	Event	Result	Rank	Result	Rank	Result	Rank	Result	Rank
Melanie Paschke	100 metres	11.31	4 Q	11.27	10 Q	11.28	12	did not advance	
Silke-Beate Knoll	200 metres	23.21	3 Q	23.04	13 Q	23.07	15	did not advance	
Anja Rücker	400 metres	52.10	11 q	—		52.32	12	did not advance	
Birthe Bruhns	800 metres	2:00.29	5 q	—		1:59.66	10	did not advance	
Christine Wachtel	800 metres	2:01.42	11 q	—		1:59.86	11	did not advance	
Sabine Zwiener	800 metres	2:01.37	10 q	—		2:00.77	13	did not advance	
Simone Weidner	1500 metres	DNF		—				did not advance	
Claudia Lokar	3000 metres	8:55.98	14 q	—				8:51.35	12
Uta Pippig	10,000 metres	32:31.90	15 Q	—				31:39.97	9
Kathrin Weßel	10,000 metres	32:52.06	19 Q	—				32:27.38	13
Katrin Dörre-Heinig	Marathon	—						2:35:20	6
Birgit Jerschabek	Marathon	—						DNF	
Claudia Metzner	Marathon	—						DNF	
Sabine Braun	100 metres hurdles	DNS							
Kristin Patzwahl	100 metres hurdles	12.98	7 Q	—		13.07	15	did not advance	
Linda Kisabaka	400 metres hurdles	57.02	24	—		did not advance			
Heike Meißner	400 metres hurdles	55.84	12 Q	—		54.64	10	did not advance	
Silvia Rieger	400 metres hurdles	56.30	15 Q	—		54.90	11	did not advance	
Kathrin Boyde	10 kilometres walk	—						46:11	15
Beate Gummelt	10 kilometres walk	—						43:28	5
Simone Thust	10 kilometres walk	—						48:38	35
Silke-Beate Knoll; Melanie Paschke; Andrea Philipp; Bettina Zipp	4 × 100 metres relay	42.81	4 Q	—				42.79	5
Linda Kisabaka; Heike Meißner; Anja Rücker; Sandra Seuser	4 × 400 metres relay	3:27.44	5 Q	—				3:25.49	5

Field events

Athlete	Event	Qualification		Final	
Athlete	Event	Distance	Position	Distance	Position
Andrea Arens-Baumert	High jump	1.87	22	did not advance	
Heike Balck	High jump	1.87	18	did not advance	
Heike Henkel	High jump	1.90	11 q	DNS	
Heike Drechsler	Long jump	6.70	3 Q	7.11	1st place, gold medalist(s)
Helga Radtke	Long jump	6.44	13	did not advance	
Susen Tiedtke	Long jump	6.66	4 q	6.54	9
Petra Laux	Triple jump	13.22	18	did not advance	
Helga Radtke	Triple jump	14.14	1 Q	14.19	5
Anja Vokuhl	Triple jump	NM		did not advance	
Astrid Kumbernuss	Shot put	19.92	2 Q	19.42	6
Kathrin Neimke	Shot put	19.11	7 Q	19.71	3rd place, bronze medalist(s)
Stephanie Storp	Shot put	19.38	4 Q	18.83	11
Franka Dietzsch	Discus throw	61.66	9 q	62.06	8
Anja Möllenbeck	Discus throw	62.82	5 Q	62.92	5
Ilke Wyludda	Discus throw	64.06	1 Q	60.42	11
Karen Forkel	Javelin throw	60.54	9 q	65.80	2nd place, silver medalist(s)
Steffi Nerius	Javelin throw	59.68	12 q	60.26	9
Silke Renk	Javelin throw	62.88	5 Q	64.00	6

Combined events – Heptathlon

Athlete	Event	100H	HJ	SP	200 m	LJ	JT	800 m	Final	Rank
Sabine Braun	Result	13.25	1.90	14.62	24.12	6.54	53.44	2:17.82	6797	2nd place, silver medalist(s)
Sabine Braun	Points	1087	1106	835	969	1020	927	853	6797	2nd place, silver medalist(s)
Birgit Clarius	Result	13.74	1.81	15.46	25.14	5.64	50.14	2:10.00	6341	8
Birgit Clarius	Points	1015	991	892	874	741	863	965	6341	8
Beatrice Mau-Repnak	Result	13.73	1.78	12.95	24.80	NM	48.86	2:12.91	5359	19
Beatrice Mau-Repnak	Points	1017	953	724	905	0	838	922	5359	19
