= 1990 European Athletics Indoor Championships – Women's high jump =

The women's high jump event at the 1990 European Athletics Indoor Championships was held in Kelvin Hall on 3 March.

== Results ==
Rank	Name	Nationality	1.75	1.80	1.84	1.88	1.91	1.94	1.96	2.00	Result	Notes
1st place, gold medalist(s)	Heike Henkel	West Germany									2.00	
2nd place, silver medalist(s)	Britta Vörös	East Germany									1.94	
3rd place, bronze medalist(s)	Alina Astafei	Romania	o	o	o	o	xxo	o	xxx		1.94	
4	Hanne Haugland	Norway									1.91	
5	Andrea Arens	West Germany									1.91	
6	Yelena Ponikarovskikh	Soviet Union									1.88	
7	Yelena Topchina	Soviet Union									1.88	
8	Niki Bakoyianni	Greece									1.88	
9	Beate Holzapfel	West Germany									1.88	
10	Maryse Éwanjé-Épée	France									1.84	
11	Jana Brenkusová	Czechoslovakia									1.84	
12	Biljana Petrović	Yugoslavia									1.84	
13	Monica Westén	Sweden									1.80	
13	Niki Gavera	Greece									1.80	
15	Disa Gísladóttir	Iceland									1.80	
15	Julia Bennett	Great Britain									1.80	
17	Sharon Foley	Ireland									1.75	
17	Christina Nordström	Sweden									1.75	
19	Margarida Moreno	Andorra									1.75	
