= 1992 European Athletics Indoor Championships – Women's high jump =

1992 high jump tournament

The women's high jump event at the 1992 European Athletics Indoor Championships was held in Palasport di Genova on 29 February.

== Results ==
Rank	Name	Nationality	1.75	1.80	1.85	1.88	1.91	1.94	1.96	2.00	2.02	2.04	Result	Notes
1st place, gold medalist(s)	Heike Henkel	Germany	–	–	–	–	o	–	o	o	o	xxx	2.02	
2nd place, silver medalist(s)	Stefka Kostadinova	Bulgaria	–	–	o	–	o	o	o	xo	o	xxx	2.02	
3rd place, bronze medalist(s)	Yelena Yelesina	Unified Team											1.94	
4	Britta Bilač	Slovenia											1.91	
5	Jo Jennings	Great Britain											1.88	
5	Niki Bakoyianni	Greece											1.88	
5	Marion Goldkamp	Germany											1.88	
5	Valentīna Gotovska	Latvia											1.88	
5	Birgit Kähler	Germany											1.88	
5	Judit Kovács	Hungary											1.88	
11	Beata Hołub	Poland											1.88	
12	Hanne Haugland	Norway											1.88	
13	Claudia Ellinger	Switzerland											1.85	
13	Svetlana Leseva	Bulgaria											1.85	
15	Donata Jancewicz	Poland											1.85	
15	Lyudmila Andonova	Bulgaria											1.85	
17	Jana Brenkusová	Czechoslovakia											1.85	
18	Debbie Marti	Great Britain											1.80	
18	Lea Haggett	Great Britain											1.80	
20	Erzsébet Fazekas	Hungary											1.80	
21	Iwona Kielan	Poland											1.80	
21	Niki Gavera	Greece											1.80	
23	Margarida Moreno	Andorra											1.75	
