= 1993 IAAF World Indoor Championships – Women's high jump =

The women's high jump event at the 1993 IAAF World Indoor Championships was held on 12 and 13 March.

== Medalists ==
| Gold | Silver | Bronze |
|---|---|---|
| Stefka Kostadinova; Bulgaria | Heike Henkel; Germany | Inha Babakova; Ukraine |

== Results ==
=== Qualification ===
Qualification: 1.92 (Q) or at least 12 best performers (q) qualified for the final.

| Rank | Name | Nationality | Result | Notes |
|---|---|---|---|---|
| 1 | Ioamnet Quintero | Cuba | 1.92 | Q |
| 2 | Inha Babakova | Ukraine | 1.90 | q |
| 2 | Stefka Kostadinova | Bulgaria | 1.90 | q |
| 2 | Angela Bradburn | United States | 1.90 | q |
| 2 | Yevgeniya Zhdanova | Russia | 1.90 | q |
| 2 | Silvia Costa | Cuba | 1.90 | q |
| 2 | Tatyana Shevchik | Belarus | 1.90 | q |
| 2 | Heike Henkel | Germany | 1.90 | q |
| 2 | Nele Žilinskienė | Lithuania | 1.90 | q, NR |
| 2 | Alina Astafei | Romania | 1.90 | q |
| 11 | Marion Goldkamp | Germany | 1.90 | q |
| 12 | Alison Inverarity | Australia | 1.90 | q |
| 13 | Jo Jennings | Great Britain | 1.90 | q |
| 14 | Inna Gliznuta | Moldova | 1.90 | q |
| 15 | Britta Bilač | Slovenia | 1.88 | |
| 16 | Olga Bolșova | Moldova | 1.88 | |
| 17 | Valentīna Gotovska | Latvia | 1.86 | |
| 18 | Judit Kovács | Hungary | 1.86 | |
| 18 | Antonella Bevilacqua | Italy | 1.86 | |
| 20 | Niki Bakoyianni | Greece | 1.86 | |
| 21 | Sieglinde Cadusch | Switzerland | 1.83 | |
| 22 | Yolanda Henry | United States | 1.79 | |
| 23 | Debbie Marti | Great Britain | 1.79 | |
| 24 | Þórdís Gísladóttir | Iceland | 1.79 | |

=== Final ===
| Rank | Name | Nationality | Result | Notes |
|---|---|---|---|---|
| 1st place, gold medalist(s) | Stefka Kostadinova | Bulgaria | 2.02 | |
| 2nd place, silver medalist(s) | Heike Henkel | Germany | 2.02 | |
| 3rd place, bronze medalist(s) | Inha Babakova | Ukraine | 2.00 | =NR |
| 4 | Alina Astafei | Romania | 1.97 | |
| 5 | Alison Inverarity | Australia | 1.97 | AR |
| 6 | Ioamnet Quintero | Cuba | 1.97 | |
| 7 | Angela Bradburn | United States | 1.94 | |
| 7 | Silvia Costa | Cuba | 1.94 | |
| 9 | Jo Jennings | Great Britain | 1.94 | =NR |
| 10 | Tatyana Shevchik | Belarus | 1.91 | |
| 11 | Nele Žilinskienė | Lithuania | 1.88 | |
| 12 | Yevgeniya Zhdanova | Russia | 1.85 | |
| 12 | Marion Goldkamp | Germany | 1.85 | |
| 14 | Inna Gliznuta | Moldova | 1.85 | |
