= 1991 IAAF World Indoor Championships – Women's high jump =

The women's high jump event at the 1991 IAAF World Indoor Championships was held on 8 and 9 March.

== Medalists ==
Gold	Silver	Bronze
Heike Henkel; Germany	Tamara Bykova; Soviet Union	Heike Balck; Germany

== Results ==
=== Qualification ===
Qualification: 1.87 (Q) or at least 12 best performers (q) qualified for the final.

Rank	Name	Nationality	Result	Notes
1	Yelena Gulyayeva	Soviet Union	1.87	Q
1	Tamara Bykova	Soviet Union	1.87	Q
1	Angela Bradburn	United States	1.87	Q
1	Donata Jancewicz	Poland	1.87	Q
1	Heike Henkel	Germany	1.87	Q
1	Yolanda Henry	United States	1.87	Q
1	Orlane Maria dos Santos	Brazil	1.87	Q, AR
8	María del Mar Martínez	Spain	1.87	Q
9	Šárka Nováková	Czechoslovakia	1.87	Q
10	Beata Hołub	Poland	1.87	Q
11	Hanne Haugland	Norway	1.87	Q
12	Svetlana Leseva	Bulgaria	1.87	Q
12	Heike Balck	Germany	1.87	Q
14	Katja Kilpi	Finland	1.87	Q
14	Debbie Marti	Great Britain	1.87	Q
16	Gai Kapernick	Australia	1.84	
17	Antonella Bevilacqua	Italy	1.84	
18	Judit Kovács	Hungary	1.84	
19	Megumi Sato	Japan	1.84	
20	Biljana Petrović	Yugoslavia	1.84	
21	Alena Varcholová	Czechoslovakia	1.80	
21	Þórdís Gísladóttir	Iceland	1.80	
21	Tania Murray	New Zealand	1.80	
24	Barbara Mencik	France	1.80	
25	Niki Bakoyianni	Greece	1.75	
26	Margarida Moreno	Andorra	1.75	

=== Final ===
Rank	Name	Nationality	1.75	1.80	1.85	1.88	1.91	1.94	1.97	2.00	2.03	Result	Notes
1st place, gold medalist(s)	Heike Henkel	Germany	–	–	o	–	o	xxo	xo	o	xx	2.00	
2nd place, silver medalist(s)	Tamara Bykova	Soviet Union	–	–	o	–	o	o	o	xxx		1.97	
3rd place, bronze medalist(s)	Heike Balck	Germany										1.94	
4	Yolanda Henry	United States										1.91	
5	Debbie Marti	Great Britain										1.91	
6	Donata Jancewicz	Poland										1.88	
6	Yelena Gulyayeva	Soviet Union										1.88	
8	Svetlana Leseva	Bulgaria										1.88	
8	Orlane Maria dos Santos	Brazil										1.88	AR
10	Beata Hołub	Poland										1.88	
11	Angela Bradburn	United States	–	o	o	xxo	xxx					1.88	
12	Hanne Haugland	Norway	o	xo	o	xxo	xxx					1.88	
13	Šárka Nováková	Czechoslovakia										1.85	
14	María del Mar Martínez	Spain	o	o	xxo	xxx						1.85	
15	Katja Kilpi	Finland										1.80	
