= 1988 World Junior Championships in Athletics – Women's high jump =

The women's high jump event at the 1988 World Junior Championships in Athletics was held in Sudbury, Ontario, Canada, at Laurentian University Stadium on 28 and 29 July.

== Medalists ==
Gold	Alina Astafei; Romania
Silver	Yelena Yelesina; Soviet Union
Bronze	Karen Scholz; East Germany

== Results ==
=== Final ===
29 July

Rank	Name	Nationality	Result	Notes
1st place, gold medalist(s)	Alina Astafei	Romania	2.00	
2nd place, silver medalist(s)	Yelena Yelesina	Soviet Union	1.96	
3rd place, bronze medalist(s)	Karen Scholz	East Germany	1.92	
4	Jo Jennings	United Kingdom	1.88	
5	Gai Kapernick	Australia	1.88	
6	Šárka Kašpárková	Czechoslovakia	1.85	
7	Heike Balck	East Germany	1.81	
8	Šárka Nováková	Czechoslovakia	1.81	
9	Natalja Jonckheere	Belgium	1.81	
10	Su Chun-Yueh	Chinese Taipei	1.81	
11	María del Carmen García	Cuba	1.81	
12	Michaela Tarantino	Italy	1.81	
13	Loretta Kiss	Australia	1.77	
13	Jennifer McDonald	Canada	1.77	
15	Coralea Brown	Canada	1.77	

=== Qualifications ===
28 Jul

==== Group A ====
Rank	Name	Nationality	Result	Notes
1	Karen Scholz	East Germany	1.84	Q
1	Alina Astafei	Romania	1.84	Q
3	Su Chun-Yueh	Chinese Taipei	1.84	Q
4	Jo Jennings	United Kingdom	1.80	q
5	Loretta Kiss	Australia	1.80	q
6	Tatyana Shevchik	Soviet Union	1.75	
7	Marjut Honkanen	Finland	1.75	
7	Birgit Kähler	West Germany	1.75	
7	Tania Murray	New Zealand	1.75	
10	Desislava Angelova	Bulgaria	1.75	
11	Julieann Broughton	United States	1.70	
	Veronica Ávila	Dominican Republic	NH	

==== Group B ====
Rank	Name	Nationality	Result	Notes
1	Heike Balck	East Germany	1.84	Q
1	Yelena Yelesina	Soviet Union	1.84	Q
3	Gai Kapernick	Australia	1.84	Q
4	Natalja Jonckheere	Belgium	1.80	q
5	Šárka Nováková	Czechoslovakia	1.80	q
5	Šárka Kašpárková	Czechoslovakia	1.80	q
7	María del Carmen García	Cuba	1.80	q
7	Michaela Tarantino	Italy	1.80	q
9	Jennifer McDonald	Canada	1.80	q
10	Coralea Brown	Canada	1.80	q
11	Tanya Hughes	United States	1.75	

== Participation ==
According to an unofficial count, 23 athletes from 17 countries participated in the event.

- Australia (2)
- Belgium (1)
- Bulgaria (1)
- Canada (2)
- Chinese Taipei (1)
- Cuba (1)
- Czechoslovakia (2)
- Dominican Republic (1)
- East Germany (2)
- Finland (1)
- Italy (1)
- New Zealand (1)
- Romania (1)
- Soviet Union (2)
- United Kingdom (1)
- United States (2)
- West Germany (1)
