= 1989 European Athletics Indoor Championships – Women's high jump =

The women's high jump event at the 1989 European Athletics Indoor Championships was held on 18 February.

== Results ==
Rank	Name	Nationality	1.75	1.80	1.84	1.88	1.91	1.94	1.96	1.98	Result	Notes
1st place, gold medalist(s)	Galina Astafei	Romania	o	o	o	o	o	xo	xo	xxx	1.96	
2nd place, silver medalist(s)	Hanne Haugland	Norway	o	xo	o	o	xo	xxo	xo	xxx	1.96	
3rd place, bronze medalist(s)	Maryse Éwanjé-Épée	France									1.91	
4	Biljana Petrović	Yugoslavia									1.88	
5	Dimitrinka Borislavova	Bulgaria									1.84	
5	Niki Bakoyianni	Greece									1.84	
7	Sabine Bramhoff	West Germany									1.84	
8	Barbara Fiammengo	Italy									1.84	
9	Sabine De Wachter	Belgium									1.80	
10	Natalia Jonckheere	Belgium									1.80	
10	Monica Westén	Sweden									1.80	
10	Marita Pakarinen	Finland									1.80	
13	Niki Gavera	Greece									1.75	
