= 1990 European Athletics Championships – Women's high jump =

Women's high jump at the European Athletics Championships

These are the official results of the Women's High Jump event at the 1990 European Championships in Split, Yugoslavia, held at Stadion Poljud on 30 and 31 August 1990. There were a total number of eighteen participating athletes.

== Medalists ==
Gold	Heike Henkel; West Germany
Silver	Biljana Petrović; Yugoslavia
Bronze	Yelena Yelesina; Soviet Union

== Results ==
=== Qualification ===
Rank	Group	Athlete	Nationality	1.75	1.80	1.84	1.88	Result	Notes
1	A	Biljana Petrović	Yugoslavia					1.88	q
2	A	Valentīna Gotovska	Soviet Union					1.88	q
3	A	Andrea Arens	West Germany					1.88	q
3	A	Svetlana Leseva	Bulgaria					1.88	q
3	A	Olga Turchak	Soviet Union					1.88	q
3	A	Jana Brenkusová	Czechoslovakia					1.88	q
7	A	Sigrid Kirchmann	Austria					1.88	q
8	A	Niki Bakogianni	Greece					1.84	
9	A	Galina Astafei	Romania					1.80	
1	B	Heike Balck	East Germany					1.88	q
1	B	Heike Henkel	West Germany					1.88	q
1	B	Yelena Yelesina	Soviet Union					1.88	q
4	B	Judit Kovács	Hungary					1.88	q
5	B	Hanne Haugland	Norway					1.88	q
6	B	Niki Gavera	Greece					1.84	
7	B	Sabine Bramhoff	West Germany					1.84	
8	B	Lea Haggett	Great Britain					1.80	
9	B	Maryse Éwanjé-Épée	France					1.75	

=== Final ===
Rank	Athlete	Nationality	1.80	1.85	1.89	1.93	1.96	1.99	2.01	Result	Notes
1st place, gold medalist(s)	Heike Henkel	West Germany	–	o	xo	o	o	o	xxx	1.99	
2nd place, silver medalist(s)	Biljana Petrović	Yugoslavia	o	o	o	o	o	xxx		1.96	
3rd place, bronze medalist(s)	Yelena Yelesina	Soviet Union	xo	o	o	xo	o	xxx		1.96	
4	Sigrid Kirchmann	Austria	o	o	o	xxx				1.89	
5	Heike Balck	East Germany			o	xxx				1.89	
5	Judit Kovács	Hungary			o	xxx				1.89	
7	Valentīna Gotovska	Soviet Union	xo	xxo	o	xxx				1.89	
8	Hanne Haugland	Norway	o	o	xo	xxx				1.89	
9	Svetlana Leseva	Bulgaria	o	xo	xxo	xxx				1.89	
10	Olga Turchak	Soviet Union								1.85	
11	Jana Brenkusová	Czechoslovakia								1.85	
12	Andrea Arens	West Germany								1.80	

== Participation ==
According to an unofficial count, 18 athletes from 13 countries participated in the event.

- Austria (1)
- Bulgaria (1)
- Czechoslovakia (1)
- East Germany (1)
- France (1)
- Great Britain (1)
- Greece (2)
- Hungary (1)
- Norway (1)
- Romania (1)
- Soviet Union (3)
- West Germany (3)
- Yugoslavia (1)

== See also ==
- National champions high jump (women)
- 1988 Women's Olympic High Jump (Seoul)
- 1991 Women's World Championships High Jump (Tokyo)
- 1992 Women's Olympic High Jump (Barcelona)
- 1994 Women's European Championships High Jump (Helsinki)
