= Athletics at the 1992 Summer Olympics – Women's high jump =

Women's high jump at the Games of the XXV Olympiad
- Pictogram for athletics
- Venues: Estadi Olimpíc de Montjuïc
- Dates: August 6, 1992 (qualification); August 8, 1992 (final)
- Competitors: 41 from 27 nations
- Winning height: 2.02

Medalists
1st place, gold medalist(s)		Heike Henkel; Germany
2nd place, silver medalist(s)		Galina Astafei; Romania
3rd place, bronze medalist(s)		Ioamnet Quintero; Cuba

These are the official results of the Women's High Jump event at the 1992 Summer Olympics in Barcelona, Spain. There were a total number of 41 participating athletes and one non starter. The qualification mark was set at 1.92 metres.

== Medalists ==
Gold	Heike Henkel; Germany
Silver	Galina Astafei; Romania
Bronze	Ioamnet Quintero; Cuba

== Records ==
These were the standing world and Olympic records (in metres) prior to the 1992 Summer Olympics.

World record	2.09	(Bulgaria) Stefka Kostadinova	Rome (ITA)	August 30, 1987
Olympic record	2.03	(United States) Louise Ritter	Seoul (KOR)	September 30, 1988

== Results ==
=== Qualification ===
Rank	Group	Name	Nationality	1.60	1.65	1.70	1.75	1.79	1.83	1.86	1.88	1.90	1.92	Result	Notes
1	A	Stefka Kostadinova	Bulgaria	–	–	–	–	–	o	o	–	o	o	1.92	Q
1	B	Heike Henkel	Germany	–	–	–	–	–	–	o	–	–	o	1.92	Q
1	B	Debbie Marti	Great Britain	–	–	–	o	o	o	o	o	o	o	1.92	Q
4	A	Galina Astafei	Romania	–	–	–	–	xo	o	o	o	o	o	1.92	Q
4	B	Ioamnet Quintero	Cuba	–	–	–	–	o	–	o	–	xo	o	1.92	Q
6	A	Birgit Kähler	Germany	–	–	–	o	o	xo	o	xo	o	o	1.92	Q
6	B	Valentīna Gotovska	Latvia	–	–	–	o	o	o	o	o	xxo	o	1.92	Q
8	A	Alison Inverarity	Australia	–	–	–	–	–	–	xo	xo	xo	o	1.92	Q
8	B	Olga Turchak	Unified Team	–	–	–	o	o	o	o	xo	xxo	o	1.92	Q
10	A	Silvia Costa	Cuba	–	–	–	–	o	–	o	–	o	xo	1.92	Q
10	B	Tatyana Shevchik	Unified Team	–	–	–	–	o	–	o	o	o	xo	1.92	Q
12	A	Donata Jancewicz	Poland	–	–	–	o	–	xo	o	o	o	xo	1.92	Q
13	A	Tanya Hughes	United States	–	–	–	–	o	o	xo	o	xxo	xo	1.92	Q
14	A	Britta Bilač	Slovenia	–	–	–	o	o	o	o	xxo	o	xxo	1.92	Q
15	B	Sigrid Kirchmann	Austria	–	–	–	–	o	o	xo	xxo	xo	xxo	1.92	Q
16	B	Megumi Sato	Japan	–	–	–	o	o	o	xxo	xxo	xxo	xxo	1.92	Q
17	B	Beata Hołub	Poland	–	–	–	–	o	o	o	–	o	xxx	1.90	
17	B	Judit Kovács	Hungary	–	–	–	o	o	o	o	o	o	xxx	1.90	
19	B	Sue Rembao	United States	–	–	–	–	o	o	xo	o	o	xxx	1.90	
20	B	Nelė Žilinskienė	Lithuania	–	–	–	o	o	xo	o	xxo	o	xxx	1.90	
21	A	Sandrine Fricot	France	–	–	–	–	o	o	o	o	xxo	xxx	1.90	
22	B	Antonella Bevilacqua	Italy	–	–	o	o	o	o	xo	xxo	xxo	xxx	1.90	
23	A	Katarzyna Majchrzak	Poland	–	–	–	o	–	o	o	o	xxx		1.88	
24	B	Niki Bakogianni	Greece	–	–	–	o	o	o	o	xo	xxx		1.88	
25	A	Lyudmila Andonova	Bulgaria	–	–	–	–	o	o	o	xxo	xxx		1.88	
25	A	Šárka Kašpárková	Czechoslovakia	–	–	–	o	o	o	o	xxo	xxx		1.88	
27	B	Amber Welty	United States	–	–	–	o	o	o	xo	xxo	xxx		1.88	
28	A	Marion Goldkamp	Germany	–	–	–	–	o	o	o	xxx			1.86	
29	B	Oana Musunoi	Romania	–	–	–	–	xo	o	o	xxx			1.86	
30	A	Jo Jennings	Great Britain	–	–	o	o	o	xxo	xo	xxx			1.86	
31	A	Sieglinde Cadusch	Switzerland	–	–	xo	o	o	o	xxo	xxx			1.86	
32	A	Olga Bolshova	Unified Team	–	–	–	–	xo	o	xxx				1.83	
33	A	Niki Gavera	Greece	–	–	xo	o	xo	o	xxx				1.83	
34	B	Svetlana Leseva	Bulgaria	–	–	–	–	o	xo	xxx				1.83	
34	B	Šárka Nováková	Czechoslovakia	–	–	o	o	o	xo	xxx				1.83	
36	B	Cristina Fink	Mexico	–	–	–	o	o	xxo	xxx				1.83	
37	A	Lucienne N'Da	Ivory Coast	–	–	o	o	o	xxx					1.79	
38	A	Najuma Fletcher	Guyana	–	xo	o	o	xxo	xxx					1.79	
39	A	Charmaine Weavers	South Africa	o	o	o	o	xxx						1.75	
40	B	Jaruwan Jenjudkarn	Thailand	–	–	xo	xxo	xxx						1.75	
41	B	Margarida Moreno	Andorra	–	o	o	xxx							1.70	
	A	Sriyani Kulawansa	Sri Lanka											DNS	

=== Final ===
Rank	Name	Nationality	1.78	1.83	1.88	1.91	1.94	1.97	2.00	2.02	2.06	Result	Notes
1st place, gold medalist(s)	Heike Henkel	Germany	–	–	–	o	–	xxo	o	o	xxx	2.02	
2nd place, silver medalist(s)	Galina Astafei	Romania	o	o	o	o	o	o	o	xxx		2.00	
3rd place, bronze medalist(s)	Ioamnet Quintero	Cuba	o	–	o	o	xo	xo	xx-	x		1.97	
4	Stefka Kostadinova	Bulgaria	–	–	o	o	o	xxx				1.94	
5	Sigrid Kirchmann	Austria	–	o	o	xo	o	xxx				1.94	
6	Silvia Costa	Cuba	–	o	o	xo	xxo	xxx				1.94	
7	Megumi Sato	Japan	o	o	xo	o	xxx					1.91	
8	Alison Inverarity	Australia	–	o	xxo	o	xxx					1.91	
9	Debbie Marti	Great Britain	o	o	o	xxo	xxx					1.91	
10	Donata Jancewicz	Poland	–	o	o	xxx						1.88	
11	Birgit Kähler	Germany	o	o	xo	xxx						1.88	
11	Tanya Hughes	United States	o	o	xo	xxx						1.88	
13	Valentīna Gotovska	Latvia	o	o	xxx							1.83	
13	Olga Turchak	Unified Team	o	o	xxx							1.83	
15	Britta Bilač	Slovenia	xo	o	xxx							1.83	
16	Tatyana Shevchik	Unified Team	–	xo	xxx							1.83	

== See also ==
- National champions high jump (women)
- 1990 Women's European Championships High Jump (Split)
- 1991 Women's World Championships High Jump (Tokyo)
- 1993 Women's World Championships High Jump (Stuttgart)
- 1994 Women's European Championships High Jump (Helsinki)
