= Athletics at the 1987 Summer Universiade – Women's high jump =

The women's high jump event at the 1987 Summer Universiade was held at the Stadion Maksimir in Zagreb on 13 and 14 July 1987.

== Medalists ==
Gold	Silver	Bronze
Svetlana Isaeva; Bulgaria	Natalya Golodnova; Soviet Union	Megumi Sato; Japan

== Results ==
=== Qualification ===
Rank	Group	Athlete	Nationality	Result	Notes
?	?	Phyllis Bluntson	United States	1.84	
?	?	Natalya Golodnova	Soviet Union	1.84	
?	?	Ge Ping	China	1.84	
?	?	Christina Fink	Mexico	1.84	
?	?	Jin Ling	China	1.84	
?	?	Kim Hui-seon	South Korea	1.84	
?	?	Megumi Sato	Japan	1.84	
?	?	Jana Brenkusová	Czechoslovakia	1.84	
?	?	Danuta Bułkowska	Poland	1.84	
?	?	Jeannie Cockcroft	Canada	1.84	
?	?	Biljana Petrović	Yugoslavia	1.84	
?	?	Jane Clough	United States	1.84	
?	?	Svetlana Isaeva	Bulgaria	1.84	
?	?	Alessandra Bonfiglioli	Italy	1.81	
?	?	Olga Turchak	Soviet Union	1.81	
?	?	Janet Boyle	Great Britain	1.81	
?	?	Iwona Jakóbczak	Poland	1.81	
?	?	Wu Wei-chung	Chinese Taipei	1.74	
?	?	Aycan Tuncayengin	Turkey	1.65	
?	?	Manuela Marxer	Liechtenstein	1.65	
	?	Heike Redetzky	West Germany	DNS	

=== Final ===
Rank	Athlete	Nationality	Result	Notes
1st place, gold medalist(s)	Svetlana Isaeva	Bulgaria	1.95	
2nd place, silver medalist(s)	Natalya Golodnova	Soviet Union	1.91	
3rd place, bronze medalist(s)	Megumi Sato	Japan	1.88	
4	Ge Ping	China	1.88	
5	Jin Ling	China	1.88	
6	Danuta Bułkowska	Poland	1.88	
7	Olga Turchak	Soviet Union	1.88	
8	Biljana Petrović	Yugoslavia	1.88	
9	Kim Hui-seon	South Korea	1.85	
10	Alessandra Bonfiglioli	Italy	1.85	
11	Jana Brenkusová	Czechoslovakia	1.85	
12	Jane Clough	United States	1.85	
13	Phyllis Bluntson	United States	1.80	
14	Jeannie Cockcroft	Canada	1.80	
15	Christina Fink	Mexico	1.80	
