= 1991 World Championships in Athletics – Women's high jump =

These are the official results of the Women's High Jump event at the 1991 IAAF World Championships in Tokyo, Japan. There were a total number of 29 participating athletes, with two qualifying groups and the final held on Saturday August 31, 1991.

The winning margin was 7 cm which as of 2024 is the greatest winning margin in the women's high jump at these championships.

== Schedule ==
- All times are Japan Standard Time (UTC+9)

Qualification Round
Group A	Group B
29.08.1991 – 10:20h	29.08.1991 – 10:20h
Final Round
31.08.1991 – 16:00h

== Results ==
=== Qualifying round ===
- Held on Thursday 1991-08-29

Rank	Group	Name	Nationality	1.70	1.75	1.79	1.83	1.86	1.88	1.90	Result	Notes
1	A	Alison Inverarity	Australia								1.90	q
2	A	Yelena Yelesina	Soviet Union								1.88	q
3	A	Tamara Bykova	Soviet Union								1.88	q
4	A	Šárka Nováková	Czechoslovakia								1.88	q
5	A	Heike Balck	Germany								1.88	q
6	A	Svetlana Leseva	Bulgaria								1.86	
7	A	Yolanda Henry	United States								1.83	
7	A	Donata Jancewicz	Poland								1.83	
7	A	Megumi Sato	Japan								1.83	
10	A	Tisha Waller	United States								1.83	
11	A	Lucienne N'Da	Ivory Coast								1.79	
12	A	Venelina Veneva	Bulgaria								1.79	
13	A	Þórdís Gísladóttir	Iceland								1.79	
14	A	Leslie Estwick	Canada								1.75	
1	B	Heike Henkel	Germany								1.90	q
1	B	Stefka Kostadinova	Bulgaria								1.90	q
1	B	Inha Babakova	Soviet Union								1.90	q
4	B	Birgit Kähler	Germany								1.90	q
5	B	Beata Hołub	Poland								1.90	q
6	B	Vanessa Ward	Australia								1.88	q
7	B	Judit Kovács	Hungary								1.88	q
8	B	Orlane Maria dos Santos	Brazil								1.86	
9	B	Debbie Marti	Great Britain								1.86	
10	B	Sue Rembao	United States								1.86	
11	B	Tania Murray	New Zealand								1.79	
12	B	Jana Brenkusová	Czechoslovakia								1.79	
13	B	Sigrid Kirchmann	Austria								1.75	
14	B	Margarida Moreno	Andorra								1.70	
	B	Vermilita Phillip	Saint Kitts and Nevis								NM	

=== Final ===
Rank	Name	Nationality	1.84	1.87	1.90	1.93	1.96	1.98	2.00	2.02	2.05	2.07	Result	Notes
1st place, gold medalist(s)	Heike Henkel	Germany	–	o	–	o	–	o	o	o	o	xxx	2.05	
2nd place, silver medalist(s)	Yelena Yelesina	Soviet Union	o	o	o	o	o	xo	xx-	x			1.98	
3rd place, bronze medalist(s)	Inha Babakova	Soviet Union	o	o	o	o	o	xxx					1.96	
4	Beata Hołub	Poland	o	o	xo	xxo	xo	xxx					1.96	
5	Birgit Kähler	Germany	o	o	o	o	xxx						1.93	
6	Stefka Kostadinova	Bulgaria	o	xo	o	o	xxx						1.93	
7	Tamara Bykova	Soviet Union	o	o	xo	xxo	xxx						1.93	
8	Judit Kovács	Hungary	o	o	o	xxx							1.90	
9	Šárka Nováková	Czechoslovakia											1.90	
10	Vanessa Ward	Australia											1.90	
11	Alison Inverarity	Australia											1.87	
12	Heike Balck	Germany											1.84	

== See also ==
- National champions high jump (women)
- 1990 Women's European Championships High Jump (Split)
- 1992 Women's Olympic High Jump (Barcelona)
- 1993 Women's World Championships High Jump (Stuttgart)
