= Tanya Hughes =

American high jumper (born 1972)

Personal information
- Born: January 25, 1972 (age 54) Baltimore, Maryland, United States

Sport
- Sport: Track and field
Medal record
Representing United States
Summer Universiade
Gold medal – first place	1993 Buffalo	High jump
Pan American Junior Championships
Silver medal – second place	1991 Kingston	High jump

Tanya Yvette Hughes (née Jones; born January 25, 1972) is a retired high jumper from the United States, who set her personal best on May 22, 1992, jumping 1.97 metres at a meet in Eugene, Oregon.

Born in Baltimore, Maryland, Hughes is a three-time American junior national indoor champion: 1989, 1990 and 1991, and a two-time national outdoor champion (1992 and 1993). She was a member of the 1992 US Olympic team in Barcelona, Spain. In 1993 she won gold at the World University Games in Buffalo, New York. Tanya attended the University of Arizona where she was a four-time NCAA high jump champion (indoor-1991 and Outdoor-1991, 1992, 1993). She was named the 1994 NCAA Woman of the Year based on her scholarship, leadership and athletic accomplishments over her collegiate career. Her 1991 clearance of 1.94m, stood as the American junior high jump record until 2015.

== Achievements ==
All results regarding high jump.

Year	Competition	Venue	Position	Notes
Representing the United States
1988	World Junior Championships	Sudbury, Canada	16th (q)	1.75 m
1990	World Junior Championships	Plovdiv, Bulgaria	11th	1.81 m
1991	Pan American Junior Championships	Kingston, Jamaica	2nd	1.87 m
1991	Pan American Games	Havana, Cuba	4th	1.80 m
1992	Olympic Games	Barcelona, Spain	11th	1.88 m (1.92)
1993	World University Games (Universiade)	Buffalo, United States	1st	1.95 m
1993	World Championships	Stuttgart, Germany	7th	1.91 m (1.93)
(q) Indicates overall position in qualifying round

Sporting positions
Preceded by Yolanda Henry	USA National High Jump Champion; 1992–1993	Succeeded by Angie Bradburn
