= Athletics at the 1993 Summer Universiade – Women's high jump =

The women's high jump event at the 1993 Summer Universiade was held at the UB Stadium in Buffalo, United States on 16 and 17 July 1993.

== Medalists ==
Gold	Silver	Bronze
Tanya Hughes; United States	Nelė Žilinskienė; Lithuania	Larisa Hryhorenko; Ukraine

== Results ==
=== Qualification ===
Rank	Group	Athlete	Nationality	Result	Notes
	A	Connie Teaberry	United States	1.83	q
	A	Nathalie Lefèbvre	France	1.83	q
	A	Natalja Jonckheere	Belgium	1.83	q
	A	Katarzyna Majchrzak	Poland	1.83	q
	A	Marion Goldkamp	Germany	1.83	q
	A	Larisa Grygorenko	Ukraine	1.83	q
	B	Natalia Moiseenko	Kazakhstan	1.83	q
	B	Tanya Hughes	United States	1.83	q
	B	Sigrid Kirchmann	Austria	1.83	q
	B	Nelė Žilinskienė	Lithuania	1.83	q
	B	Alena Varcholová	Czech Republic	1.83	q
	B	Svetlana Zalevskaya	Kazakhstan	1.83	q
	B	Julia Bennett	Great Britain	1.83	q
	B	Heike Balck	Germany	1.83	q
	B	Oana Musunoiu	Romania	1.80	
	B	Marija Jerković	Independent Participants	1.80	
	B	Wanita Dykstra	Canada	1.80	
	B	Ana Lúcia Silva	Brazil	1.75	
	B	Kaisa Gustafsson	Finland	1.75	
	B	María del Martínez	Spain	1.75	

=== Final ===
Rank	Athlete	Nationality	Result	Notes
1st place, gold medalist(s)	Tanya Hughes	United States	1.95	
2nd place, silver medalist(s)	Nelė Žilinskienė	Lithuania	1.95	
3rd place, bronze medalist(s)	Larisa Grygorenko	Ukraine	1.95	
4	Heike Balck	Germany	1.93	
5	Svetlana Zalevskaya	Kazakhstan	1.93	
6	Sigrid Kirchmann	Austria	1.91	
7	Katarzyna Majchrzak	Poland	1.91	
8	Connie Teaberry	United States	1.91	
8	Marion Goldkamp	Germany	1.91	
10	Natalja Jonckheere	Belgium	1.86	
11	Alena Varcholová	Czech Republic	1.86	
12	Nathalie Lefèbvre	France	1.83	
13	Natalia Moiseenko	Kazakhstan	1.80	
14	Julia Bennett	Great Britain	1.80	
