= Germany at the World Athletics Championships =

- WA code: GER
- National federation: German Athletics Association
- Website: www.leichtathletik.de
- Medals Ranked 5th: Gold 39 Silver 36 Bronze 48 Total 123

World Athletics Championships appearances (overview)
- 1991; 1993; 1995; 1997; 1999; 2001; 2003; 2005; 2007; 2009; 2011; 2013; 2015; 2017; 2019; 2022; 2023; 2025

Germany has participated in every edition of the World Athletics Championships since 1991. Prior to 1991, separate West Germany and East Germany teams competed at the global athletics competition. Germany has won the fifth highest total of gold medals at the event and has the fifth highest medal total overall.

Germany's delegations are typically among the largest at the competition, numbering around 60-80 athletes. The country has a strong history in the sport for both men's and women's teams, and it enters competitors in most events at each championships. It ranks second behind the United States in the World Athletics placing tables, which awards points for top eight finishes. Germany has been most successful in the men's and women's throwing events, and the field events more generally. Its relay teams are competitive and regularly make the finals.

The country's most successful athlete is men's discus throw champion Lars Riedel, who from 1991 to 2001 won five world titles and one bronze medal. Another discus thrower, Robert Harting, has three gold medals and one silver medal to his name. Several women hold a claim to be Germany's most successful female athlete: Astrid Kumbernuss and Franka Dietzsch each have won three gold medals in throwing events, sprinter Grit Breuer has the highest total at six medals, while another sprinter Katrin Krabbe has two golds and two bronze medals (all won in 1991).

As of the 2019 World Athletics Championships, no German athlete has been disqualified from the competition for doping.

== Medal table ==
Red border indicates tournament was held on home soil.

Championships	Men			Women			Total					
Championships	Gold	Silver	Bronze	Gold	Silver	Bronze	Gold	Silver	Bronze	Total	Rank	Athletes
1991 Tokyo	1	0	4	4	4	4	5	4	8	17	3	
1993 Stuttgart	1	0	3	1	2	1	2	2	4	8	6	
1995 Gothenburg	1	0	1	1	2	1	2	2	2	6	3	
1997 Athens	2	1	2	3	0	2	5	1	4	10	2	
1999 Seville	2	2	2	2	2	2	4	4	4	12	3	
2001 Edmonton	2	1	1	1	2	0	3	3	1	7	4	
2003 Paris	0	0	2	0	1	1	0	1	3	4	27	
2005 Helsinki	0	0	3	1	1	2	1	1	5	7	11	
2007 Osaka	0	1	1	2	2	1	2	3	2	7	5	
2009 Berlin	1	0	2	1	4	1	2	4	3	9	4	85
2011 Daegu	3	0	0	0	4	1	3	4	1	8	4	65
2013 Moscow	3	1	1	1	1	0	4	2	1	7	5	67
2015 Beijing	0	2	1	2	1	2	2	3	3	8	7	62
2017 London	1	1	1	0	1	1	1	2	2	5	9	76
2019 Doha	1	0	1	1	0	3	2	0	4	6	7	65
2022 Eugene	0	0	0	1	0	1	1	0	1	2	19	79
2023 Budapest	0	0	0	0	0	0	0	0	0	0	-	75
2025 Tokyo	1	2	0	0	1	1	1	3	1	5	12	80
2027 Beijing	To be determined											
2029 Nairobi	To be determined											
2031 Munich	To be determined											
Total	19	11	25	21	28	24	40	39	49	128	5	

== Medalists ==
Athlete	Gold	Silver	Bronze	Total	Years
Lars Riedel	5	0	1	6	1991–2001
Robert Harting	3	1	0	4	2007–2013
Astrid Kumbernuss	3	0	0	3	1995–1999
Franka Dietzsch	3	0	0	3	1999–2007
Sabine Braun	2	1	0	3	1991–1997
David Storl	2	1	0	3	2011–2015
Katrin Krabbe	2	0	2	4	1991
Malaika Mihambo	2	0	0	2	2019–2022
Grit Breuer	1	2	3	6	1991–2001
Betty Heidler	1	2	0	3	2007–2011
Christina Obergföll	1	2	0	3	2005–2013
Heike Drechsler	1	1	1	3	1991–1993
Anja Rücker	1	1	1	3	1997–1999
Raphael Holzdeppe	1	1	0	2	2013–2015
Christina Schwanitz	1	1	1	3	2013–2019
Steffi Nerius	1	0	3	4	2003–2009
Uta Rohländer *	1	0	2	3	1991–1999
Heinz Weis	1	0	1	2	1991–1999
Martin Buß	1	0	1	2	1999–2001
Anke Feller *	1	0	1	2	1997–1999
Melanie Paschke *	1	0	1	2	1995–2001
Johannes Vetter	1	0	1	2	2017–2019
* Relay medals only
