= Beata Hołub =

Polish high jumper

Personal information
- Born: 19 July 1967 (age 58) Opole, Lubelskie, Poland
- Height: 175 cm (5 ft 9 in)
- Weight: 56 kg (123 lb)

Sport
- Country: Poland
- Sport: Athletics
- Event: High jump
- Club: Start Lubin

Beata Hołub (née Drozd, born 19 July 1967 in Opole, Lubelskie) is a retired Polish high jumper, who competed for her native country at the 1992 Summer Olympics.

She finished tenth at the 1991 World Indoor Championships, fourth at the 1991 World Championships and eleventh at the 1992 European Indoor Championships.

== International competitions ==
| Year | Competition | Venue | Position | Notes |
Representing Poland
| 1991 | World Indoor Championships | Seville, Spain | 10th | 1.88 m |
| 1991 | World Championships | Tokyo, Japan | 4th | 1.96 m |
| 1992 | European Indoor Championships | Genoa, Italy | 11th | 1.88 m |
| 1992 | Olympic Games | Barcelona, Spain | 17th (q) | 1.90 m |
