= Germany at the 2009 World Championships in Athletics =

- WA code: GER
- National federation: Deutscher Leichtathletik-Verband
- Website: www.leichtathletik.de

in Berlin
- Competitors: 91
- Medals: Gold 2 Silver 3 Bronze 4 Total 9

World Championships in Athletics appearances (overview)
- 1991; 1993; 1995; 1997; 1999; 2001; 2003; 2005; 2007; 2009; 2011; 2013; 2015; 2017; 2019; 2022; 2023; 2025

Germany competed at the 2009 World Championships in Athletics between August 15 and 23 as the host nation. A team of 92 athletes was announced in preparation for the competition, but then women's Marathon world leader Irina Mikitenko and hurdler Thomas Goller withdrew from the Championships. Mikitenko was replaced by Ulrike Maisch, the European Champion at the time. Selected athletes have achieved one of the competition's qualifying standards. In 2009, six out of the seven medallists for Germany from the 2007 competition competed, including the gold medallists Betty Heidler and Franka Dietzsch. Women's high jump world leader Ariane Friedrich and European record holders Christina Obergföll and Sebastian Bayer are among Germany's other aspiring medallists.

== Team selection ==
Track and road events

Event	Athletes	
Event	Men	Women
100 metres	Martin Keller; Stefan Schwab; Tobias Unger	Verena Sailer; Marion Wagner
200 metres	Robert Hering; Alexander Kosenkow; Aleixo Platini Menga	
400 metres		Sorina Nwachukwu
800 metres	Robin Schembera	Jana Hartmann
1500 metres	Stefan Eberhardt; Carsten Schlangen	
5000 metres	Arne Gabius	
10000 metres		Sabrina Mockenhaupt
Marathon	Martin Beckmann; Falk Cierpinski; Stefan Koch; André Pollmächer; Tobias Sauter	Susanne Hahn; Melanie Kraus; Ulrike Maisch; Sabrina Mockenhaupt; Luminita Zaituc
100 metres hurdles	—	Carolin Nytra
110 metres hurdles	Matthias Bühler; Alexander John; Helge Schwarzer	—
400 metres hurdles		Jonna Tilgner
3000 m steeplechase	Steffen Uliczka	Antje Möldner
20 km race walk	André Höhne	Sabine Krantz
50 km race walk	André Höhne	—
4 × 100 metres relay	Marius Broening; Martin Keller; Alexander Kosenkow; Daniel Schnelting; Stefan Schwab; Tobias Unger	Anne Möllinger; Verena Sailer; Lisa Schorr; Cathleen Tschirch; Marion Wagner; Katja Wakan
4 × 400 metres relay	Martin Grothkopp; Kamghe Gaba; Ruwen Faller; Eric Krüger; Jonas Plass; Thomas Schneider	Esther Cremer; Florence Ekpo-Umoh; Claudia Hoffmann; Fabienne Kohlmann; Sorina Nwachukwu; Jonna Tilgner

Field and combined events

Event	Athletes	
Event	Men	Women
Pole vault	Malte Mohr; Björn Otto; Alexander Straub	Anna Battke; Kristina Gadschiew; Silke Spiegelburg
High jump	Raul Spank	Ariane Friedrich; Meike Kröger
Long jump	Sebastian Bayer; Nils Winter	Melanie Bauschke; Bianca Kappler; Beatrice Marscheck
Triple jump	Charles Friedek	Katja Demut
Shot put	Ralf Bartels; Peter Sack; David Storl	Denise Hinrichs; Nadine Kleinert; Christina Schwanitz
Discus throw	Robert Harting; Markus Münch	Franka Dietzsch; Nadine Müller
Hammer throw	Markus Esser; Sergej Litvinov	Andrea Bunjes; Betty Heidler; Kathrin Klaas
Javelin throw	Mark Frank; Tino Häber	Steffi Nerius; Christina Obergföll; Linda Stahl
Heptathlon	—	Julia Mächtig; Jennifer Oeser; Lilli Schwarzkopf
Decathlon	Pascal Behrenbruch; Moritz Cleve; Norman Müller	—

== Medalists ==
The following competitors from Germany won medals at the Championships.

Medal	Athlete	Event	Date
Gold	Steffi Nerius	Women's javelin throw	18 August
Gold	Robert Harting	Men's discus throw	19 August
Silver	Jennifer Oeser	Women's heptathlon	16 August
Silver	Nadine Kleinert	Women's shot put	16 August
Silver	Betty Heidler	Women's hammer throw	22 August
Bronze	Ralf Bartels	Men's shot put	15 August
Bronze	Ariane Friedrich	Women's high jump	20 August
Bronze	Raul Spank	Men's high jump	21 August
Bronze	Anne Cibis; Verena Sailer; Cathleen Tschirch; Marion Wagner	Women's 4 × 100 metres relay	22 August

== Results ==
=== Men ===
Track and road events

Event	Athletes	Heat Round 1		Heat Round 2		Semifinal		Final	
Event	Athletes	Result	Rank	Result	Rank	Result	Rank	Result	Rank
100 m	Martin Keller	10.35	23 q	10.40	35	Did not advance			
100 m	Stefan Schwab	10.50	50	did not advance					
100 m	Tobias Unger	10.42	44	did not advance					
200 m	Robert Hering	20.64	3 Q	20.58	10 Q	20.52	11	Did not advance	
200 m	Alexander Kosenkow	20.99	34	Did not advance					
200 m	Aleixo Platini Menga	20.84	21 Q	20.68	17	Did not advance			
800 m	Robin Schembera	1:54.47	46	Did not advance					
1500 m	Stefan Eberhardt	3:40.10	25	Did not advance					
1500 m	Carsten Schlangen	3:44.00	35	Did not advance					
5000 m	Arne Gabius	13:49.13	28	Did not advance					
110 m hurdles	Matthias Bühler	13.75	33	Did not advance					
110 m hurdles	Alexander John	13.41	3 Q			13.64	22	Did not advance	
110 m hurdles	Helge Schwarzer	13.66	23 Q			13.72	23	Did not advance	
3000 m steeplechase	Steffen Uliczka	8:37.99	23	Did not advance					
4 × 100 m relay	Marius Broening; Martin Keller; Alexander Kosenkow; Daniel Schnelting; Stefan Schwab; Tobias Unger	DNF		Did not advance					
4 × 400 m relay	Martin Grothkopp; Kamghe Gaba; Ruwen Faller; Eric Krüger; Jonas Plass; Thomas Schneider	3:03.52	11					Did not advance	
Marathon	Martin Beckmann							2:18:08	35
Marathon	Falk Cierpinski							2:22:36	51
Marathon	André Pollmächer							2:15:36	18
Marathon	Tobias Sauter							2:35:43	66
20 km walk	André Höhne							1:21:59	14
50 km walk	André Höhne							3:43.19 PB	5

Field events

Event	Athletes	Qualification		Final	
Event	Athletes	Result	Rank	Result	Rank
Long jump	Sebastian Bayer	7.98	19	Did not advance	
Long jump	Nils Winter	7.69	34	Did not advance	
Triple jump	Charles Friedek	NM		Did not advance	
High jump	Raul Spank	2.30	4 Q	2.32	Bronze medal
Pole vault	Malte Mohr	5.65	7 q	5.50	14
Pole vault	Björn Otto	5.55	19	Did not advance	
Pole vault	Alexander Straub	5.65	1 q	5.65	7
Shot put	Ralf Bartels	20.41 Q	6	21.37	Bronze medal
Shot put	Peter Sack	20.20 q	9	NM	
Shot put	David Storl	19.19	28	did not advance	
Discus throw	Robert Harting	66.81	1 Q	69.43	Gold medal
Discus throw	Markus Münch	60.55	20	Did not advance	
Hammer throw	Markus Esser	76.81	8 q	76.27	6
Hammer throw	Sergey Lytvynov	77.58	4 Q	76.58	5
Javelin throw	Mark Frank	80.85	5 q	81.32	8
Javelin throw	Tino Häber	74.11	34	Did not advance	
Decathlon	Pascal Behrenbruch			8439	6
Decathlon	Moritz Cleve			7777	27
Decathlon	Norman Müller			8096	16

=== Women ===
Track and road events

Event	Athletes	Heat Round 1		Heat Round 2		Semifinal		Final	
Event	Athletes	Result	Rank	Result	Rank	Result	Rank	Result	Rank
100 m	Verena Sailer	11.29	4 Q	11.26	12 q	11.24	11	Did not advance	
100 m	Marion Wagner	11.49	23 Q	11.64	31	Did not advance			
400 m	Sorina Nwachukwu	51.74	16 Q			51.98	18	Did not advance	
800 m	Jana Hartmann	2:04.99	29	Did not advance					
100 m hurdles	Carolin Nytra	13.03	17 Q			12.94	13	Did not advance	
400 m hurdles	Jonna Tilgner	56.73	24 q			57.11	21	Did not advance	
3000 m steeplechase	Antje Möldner	9:21.73 NR	2 Q					9:18.54 NR	9
4 × 100 m relay	Anne Möllinger; Verena Sailer; Lisa Schorr; Cathleen Tschirch; Marion Wagner; Katja Wakan	42.96	3 Q					42.87	Bronze medal
4 × 400 m relay	Esther Cremer; Florence Ekpo-Umoh; Claudia Hoffmann; Fabienne Kohlmann; Sorina Nwachukwu; Jonna Tilgner	3:25.08	3 Q					3:27.61	5
Marathon	Susanne Hahn							2:38:39	34
Marathon	Ulrike Maisch							DNF	
Marathon	Sabrina Mockenhaupt							2:30:07	17
Marathon	Luminita Zaituc							DNF	
20 kilometres walk	Sabine Krantz							DNF	

Field and combined events

Event	Athletes	Qualification		Final	
Event	Athletes	Result	Rank	Result	Rank
Long jump	Melanie Bauschke	6.32	23	Did not advance	
Long jump	Bianca Kappler	6.29	25	Did not advance	
Long jump	Beatrice Marscheck	6.19	31	Did not advance	
Triple jump	Katja Demut	11.38	34	Did not advance	
High jump	Ariane Friedrich	1.95	1 Q	2.02	Bronze medal
High jump	Meike Kröger	1.92	10 q	1.87	11
Pole vault	Anna Battke	4.55	7 q	4.40	7
Pole vault	Kristina Gadschiew	4.50	12 q	4.40	10
Pole vault	Silke Spiegelburg	4.55	1 q	4.65	4
Shot put	Denise Hinrichs	18.69	6 Q	18.39	11
Shot put	Nadine Kleinert	19.36	2 Q	20.20 PB	Silver medal
Shot put	Christina Schwanitz	18.25	9 q	17.84	12
Discus throw	Franka Dietzsch	58.44	23	Did not advance	
Discus throw	Nadine Müller	61.63	9 Q	62.04	6
Hammer throw	Andrea Bunjes	67.01	24	Did not advance	
Hammer throw	Betty Heidler	75.27 CR	1 Q	77.12 NR	Silver medal
Hammer throw	Kathrin Klaas	70.53	11 q	74.23 PB	4
Javelin throw	Steffi Nerius	61.73	6 q	67.30	Gold medal
Javelin throw	Christina Obergföll	60.74	7 q	64.34	5
Javelin throw	Linda Stahl	63.86	2 Q	63.23	6
Heptathlon	Julia Mächtig			6265	8
Heptathlon	Jennifer Oeser			6493	Silver medal
Heptathlon	Lilli Schwarzkopf			DNF	
