= Barbara Fiammengo =

Italian former high jumper

Personal information
- National team: Italy: 14 (1983-1992)
- Born: 20 September 1967 (age 58) Turin, Italy

Sport
- Sport: Athletics
- Event: High jump
- Club: Cus Bologna; Iveco Torino

Achievements and titles
- Personal best: 1.90 m (1983)

Barbara Fiammengo (born 20 September 1967) is a former Italian high jumper.

== Career ==
Fiammengo established her personal best in the high jump with 1.90 m in 1983 at the age of 16 still to be accomplished. This is still today, after almost forty years still a national record under 18 and 24th best world performance (the world record is 1.96 m).

Three-time national champion at senior level in high jump from 1988 to 1981, the best result at international level during her career was the 8th place at the 1989 European Indoor Championships.

== National records ==
Under 18

Since 1983 (in 2023 it is 40 years) she has held the Italian under-18 record. Only on 22 June 2010, even after 27 years, this record was equaled by Alessia Trost.

- High jump: 1.90 m ( (Italy) Riccione, 17 September 1983), current holder.

== Achievements ==
Year	Competition	Venue	Rank	Event	Measure	Notes
1989	European Indoor Championships	(Netherlands) The Hague	8th	High jump	1.84 m	

== National titles ==
Fiammengo won three national championships at individual senior level.

- Italian Athletics Championships
  - High jump: 1988, 1990, 1991
