= Yelena Yelesina =

Soviet/Russian high jumper

Yelena Borisovna Yelesina
Personal information
- Nationality: Russian
- Born: April 4, 1970 (age 56) Chelyabinsk, Russian SFSR, Soviet Union

Sport
- Sport: Athletics
- Event: High jump
Medal record
Women's athletics
Representing Russia
Olympic Games
Gold medal – first place	2000 Sydney	High jump
World Championships
Silver medal – second place	1999 Seville	High jump
European Indoor Championships
Bronze medal – third place	1992 Genoa	High jump
Bronze medal – third place	1998 Valencia	High jump
Representing Soviet Union
World Championships
Silver medal – second place	1991 Tokyo	High jump
European Championships
Bronze medal – third place	1990 Split	High jump

Yelena Borisovna Yelesina (Russian: Елена Борисовна Елесина; born April 4, 1970) is a Russian female high jumper. She won the gold medal at the 2000 Summer Olympics with 2,01m, one centimetre behind her personal best jump. She also won several other medals outside her Olympic gold.

== International competitions ==
All results regarding high jump.

Year	Competition	Venue	Position	Notes
Representing Soviet Union
1987	European Junior Championships	Birmingham, United Kingdom	3rd	1.84 m
1988	World Junior Championships	Sudbury, Canada	2nd	1.96 m
1989	European Junior Championships	Varaždin, Yugoslavia	1st	1.95 m
1990	Goodwill Games	Seattle, United States	1st	2.02 m
1990	European Championships	Split, Yugoslavia	3rd	1.96 m
1991	Universiade	Sheffield, United Kingdom	4th	1.90 m
1991	World Championships	Tokyo, Japan	2nd	1.98 m
Representing Unified Team
1992	European Indoor Championships	Genoa, Italy	3rd	1.94 m
Representing Russia
1998	European Indoor Championships	Valencia, Spain	3rd	1.94 m
1999	World Championships	Seville, Spain	2nd	1.99 m
2000	Olympic Games	Sydney, Australia	1st	2.01 m
2001	World Championships	Edmonton, Canada	13th (q)	1.88 m
2003	World Indoor Championships	Birmingham, United Kingdom	2nd	1.99 m

== See also ==
- List of Olympic medalists in athletics (women)
- List of 2000 Summer Olympics medal winners
- List of ties for medals at the Olympics
- List of World Athletics Championships medalists (women)
- List of IAAF World Indoor Championships medalists (women)
- List of European Athletics Championships medalists (women)
- List of European Athletics Indoor Championships medalists (women)
- List of high jump national champions (women)
- List of Russian sportspeople
- List of people from Chelyabinsk
- High jump at the Olympics
- High jump at the World Championships in Athletics

Sporting positions
Preceded by Silvia Costa	Women's High Jump Best Year Performance; 1990	Succeeded by Heike Henkel
