= Margarida Moreno =

Andorran track and field athlete (born 1968)

Personal information
- Full name: Margarida Moreno Sánchez
- Nickname: Maggy
- Born: 3 April 1968 (age 58)
- Height: 176 cm (5 ft 9 in)

Sport
- Country: Andorra
- Sport: Athletics
- Event: High jump

Achievements and titles
- Personal best: 1.83 m (6 ft 0 in) (1991)

Margarida "Maggy" Moreno Sánchez (Note: In this Catalan name, the first or paternal surname is Moreno and the second or maternal family name is Sánchez; both are generally joined by the conjunction "i".) (born 3 April 1968) is an Andorran track and field athlete who competed at the 1992 Summer Olympics.

Moreno's first major competition was the 1991 IAAF World Indoor Championships where she competed in the high jump. Her jump of 1.75 metres (5 feet 9 inches) placed her in 26th place during the qualification stage and so she didn't qualify for the final. Later in the year she also competed in the high jump at the 1991 World Championships in Athletics in Tokyo, she only managed to jump 1.70 metres (5 feet 7 inches) and again failed to reach the final.

The following year Moreno was picked for the 1992 Summer Olympics, she was also chosen to be her country's flag bearer at the opening ceremony. In the high jump she jumped 1.70 metres (5 feet 7 inches) and finished 41st so didn't qualify for the final.

Her personal bests in the event are 1.83 metres outdoors (Monzón 1991) and 1.81 metres indoors (San Sebastián 1990). Both are standing national records.

== International competitions ==
| Year | Competition | Venue | Position | Notes |
Representing Andorra
| 1989 | Games of the Small States of Europe | Nicosia, Cyprus | 1st | 1.77 m |
| 1990 | European Indoor Championships | Glasgow, United Kingdom | 19th | 1.75 m |
| 1991 | World Indoor Championships | Seville, Spain | 26th (q) | 1.75 m |
| 1991 | Games of the Small States of Europe | Andorra la Vella, Andorra | 3rd | 1.80 m |
| 1991 | World Championships | Tokyo, Japan | 28th (q) | 1.70 m |
| 1992 | European Indoor Championships | Genoa, Italy | 23rd | 1.75 m |
| 1992 | Olympic Games | Barcelona, Spain | 41st (q) | 1.70 m |
| 1993 | Games of the Small States of Europe | Valetta, Malta | 3rd | 1.74 m |
| 2005 | Games of the Small States of Europe | Andorra la Vella, Andorra | 4th | 1.65 m |
| 2007 | Games of the Small States of Europe | Fontvieille, Monaco | 6th | 1.65 m |
