= Svetlana Leseva =

Bulgarian high jumper

Personal information
- Born: 18 March 1967 (age 59) Montana, Bulgaria
- Height: 1.82 m (6 ft 0 in)
- Weight: 60 kg (132 lb)

Sport
- Sport: Athletics
- Event: High jump
- Club: Spartak Pleven; Trakia Club
Medal record
Women's athletics
Representing Bulgaria
European Championships
Silver medal – second place	1986 Stuttgart	High jump
Summer Universiade
Gold medal – first place	1987 Zagreb	High jump

Svetlana Mitkova Isaeva-Leseva, née Isaeva, (Bulgarian: Светлана Миткова Исаева-Лесева; born 18 March 1967 in Montana, Bulgaria) is a retired Bulgarian athlete who specialised in the high jump. She represented her country at the 1992 Summer Olympics as well as two indoor and three outdoor World Championships. Her biggest success is the silver medal at the 1986 European Championships in Stuttgart.

Her personal best in the event is 2.00 metres outdoors (Dráma 1987) and 1.94 metres indoors (Piraeus 1994).

== Competition record ==
Year	Competition	Venue	Position	Notes
Representing Bulgaria
1983	European Junior Championships	Schwechat, Austria	4th	1.85 m
1985	European Junior Championships	Cottbus, East Germany	3rd	1.88 m
1986	European Indoor Championships	Madrid, Spain	7th	1.85 m
1986	Goodwill Games	Moscow, Soviet Union	3rd	1.96 m
1986	European Championships	Stuttgart, West Germany	2nd	1.93 m
1987	European Indoor Championships	Liévin, France	12th	1.85 m
1987	Universiade	Zagreb, Yugoslavia	1st	1.95 m
1987	World Championships	Rome, Italy	7th	1.93 m
1990	European Championships	Split, Yugoslavia	9th	1.89 m
1991	World Indoor Championships	Seville, Spain	8th	1.88 m
1991	World Championships	Tokyo, Japan	13th (q)	1.86 m
1992	European Indoor Championships	Genoa, Italy	13th	1.85 m
1992	Olympic Games	Barcelona, Spain	34th (q)	1.83 m
1994	Goodwill Games	St. Petersburg, Russia	6th	1.88 m
1994	European Championships	Helsinki, Finland	7th	1.90 m
1995	World Indoor Championships	Barcelona, Spain	12th	1.85 m
1995	World Championships	Gothenburg, Sweden	7th	1.93 m
