= Cristina Fink =

Mexican high jumper

Personal information
- Born: December 12, 1964 (age 61) Mexico City, Mexico

Sport
- Sport: Track and field
- Club: Arizona Wildcats
Medal record
Representing Mexico
Central American and Caribbean Games
Silver medal – second place	1986 Santiago	High jump
Bronze medal – third place	1990 Mexico City	High jump

Cristina Fink Smith (born December 12, 1964) is a Mexican psychologist and retired high jumper. She set her personal best on May 17, 1992, jumping 1.94 meters at a meet in Mexico City. She competed for her country at the 1988 Summer Olympics in Seoul, South Korea, where she finished in 20th place (1.84 meters). Her son, Pablo Sisniega, is a goalkeeper for San Diego FC

Fink was an All-American jumper for the Arizona Wildcats track and field team, finishing 3rd in the high jump at the 1988 NCAA Division I Indoor Track and Field Championships.

== International competitions ==
Year	Competition	Venue	Position	Event	Notes
Representing Mexico
1985	Central American and Caribbean Championships	Nassau, Bahamas	2nd	High jump	1.81 m
1986	Central American and Caribbean Games	Santiago de los Caballeros, Dominican Republic	2nd	High jump	1.81 m
1987	Universiade	Zagreb, Yugoslavia	15th	High jump	1.80 m
1987	Pan American Games	Havana, Cuba	6th	High jump	1.70 m
1988	Ibero-American Championships	Mexico City, Mexico	2nd	High jump	1.88 m A
1988	Olympic Games	Seoul, South Korea	20th (q)	High jump	1.84 m
1989	World Indoor Championships	Budapest, Hungary	18th	High jump	1.80 m
1989	Universiade	Duisburg, West Germany	13th	High jump	1.80 m
1990	Central American and Caribbean Games	Mexico City, Mexico	3rd	High jump	1.79 m
1990	Central American and Caribbean Games	Mexico City, Mexico	–	Heptathlon	DNF
1991	Central American and Caribbean Championships	Xalapa, Mexico	1st	High jump	1.86 m
1991	Pan American Games	Havana, Cuba	5th	High jump	1.75 m
1992	Ibero-American Championships	Seville, Spain	3rd	High jump	1.87 m
1992	Olympic Games	Barcelona, Spain	36th (q)	High jump	1.83 m
1998	Central American and Caribbean Games	Maracaibo, Venezuela	6th	High jump	1.65 m
