= Joanne Jennings =

British athlete

Jo Jennings
Personal information
- Nationality: British (English)
- Born: 20 September 1969 (age 56) Pakenham, Suffolk
- Height: 174 cm (5 ft 9 in)
- Weight: 60 kg (132 lb)

Sport
- Sport: Athletics
- Event: high jump
- Club: West Suffolk AC
Medal record
Athletics
Representing England
Commonwealth Games
Silver medal – second place	1998 Kuala Lumpur	high jump

Joanne Loraine "Jo" Jennings (later Steele; born 20 September 1969 in Pakenham, Suffolk) is a female retired high jumper from England who twice competed for Great Britain at the Summer Olympics.

== Biography ==
Jennings finished second behind Janet Boyle in the high jump event at the 1988 AAA Championships.

Jennings represented England in the high jump event, at the 1990 Commonwealth Games in Auckland, New Zealand and at the 1992 Olympic Games in Barcelona, she represented Great Britain for the second time. The following year set her personal best (1.94 metres) at the IAAF World Indoor Championships in Toronto in 1993, where she finished ninth.

Jennings became the British high jump champion after winning the British AAA Championships title at the 1998 AAA Championships, 1999 AAA Championships and 2000 AAA Championships.

Jennings later represented England and won a silver medal, at the 1998 Commonwealth Games in Kuala Lumpur, Malaysia.

== Personal life ==
As of September 2013 Jennings is a development manager at British Athletics.

== International competitions ==
Year	Competition	Venue	Position	Event	Notes
Representing Great Britain and England
1987	European Junior Championships	Birmingham, England	6th	High jump	1.80 m
1988	World Junior Championships	Sudbury, Canada	4th	High jump	1.88 m
1988	Olympic Games	Seoul, South Korea	16th (q)	High jump	1.90 m
1990	Commonwealth Games	Auckland, New Zealand	15th	High jump	1.70 m
1992	European Indoor Championships	Genoa, Italy	=5th	High jump	1.88 m
1992	Olympic Games	Barcelona, Spain	30th (q)	High jump	1.86 m
1993	World Indoor Championships	Toronto, Canada	9th	High jump	1.94 m
1993	World Championships	Stuttgart, Germany	30th (q)	High jump	1.80 m
1998	Commonwealth Games	Kuala Lumpur, Malaysia	2nd	High jump	1.91 m

Note: Results with a Q, indicate overall position in qualifying round.
