= Donata Jancewicz =

Polish high jumper

Personal information
- Nationality: Polish
- Born: 17 June 1969 (age 57) Gdańsk, Poland
- Height: 1.86 m (6 ft 1 in)
- Weight: 66 kg (146 lb)

Sport
- Sport: Athletics
- Event: High jump
- Club: SKLA Sopot
Medal record
Women's athletics
Representing Poland
European Championships
Silver medal – second place	1998 Budapest	High jump

Donata Jancewicz-Wawrzyniak, née Donata Jancewicz, (born 17 June 1969 in Gdańsk) is a retired female high jumper from Poland. She set her personal best on 23 August 1998, jumping 1.95 metres at the European Championships in Budapest where she won silver medal. She is a four-time Polish national indoor champion. She represented her native country at the 1992 Summer Olympics in Barcelona, Spain.

== Competition record ==
Year	Competition	Venue	Position	Notes
Representing Poland
1991	World Indoor Championships	Seville, Spain	6th	1.88 m
1991	World Championships	Tokyo, Japan	17th (q)	1.83 m
1992	European Indoor Championships	Genoa, Italy	15th	1.85 m
1992	Olympic Games	Barcelona, Spain	10th	1.88 m
1994	European Championships	Helsinki, Finland	19th (q)	1.85 m
1996	European Indoor Championships	Stockholm, Sweden	10th	1.89 m
1998	European Championships	Budapest, Hungary	2nd	1.95 m
