= Angela Bradburn-Spangler =

American high jumper (born 1968)

Personal information
- Born: September 4, 1968 (age 57) Fort Wayne, Indiana, United States

Sport
- Sport: Track and field
- Club: Texas Longhorns
Medal record
Women's Athletics
Representing the United States
Pan American Games
Bronze medal – third place	1995 Mar del Plata	High jump

Angela Bradburn-Spangler (born September 4, 1968) is a retired high jumper from the United States, who set her outdoor personal best on May 28, 1994, jumping 1.95 metres at a meet in Wörrstadt. Her indoor best is 1.98 metres set on March 5, 1994, in Atlanta. She is the 1994 US national champion and three-time US national indoor champion (1992, 1994 and 1997).

Representing the Texas Longhorns women's track and field team, Spangler won the 1990 NCAA Division I Outdoor Track and Field Championships in the high jump.

== Competition record ==
Year	Competition	Venue	Position	Notes
Representing the United States
1991	World Indoor Championships	Seville, Spain	11th	1.88 m
1993	World Indoor Championships	Toronto, Ontario, Canada	7th	1.94 m
1994	Goodwill Games	St. Petersburg, Russia	6th	1.88 m
1995	Pan American Games	Mar del Plata, Argentina	3rd	1.91 m
1997	World Indoor Championships	Paris, France	15th (q)	1.90 m
1997	World Championships	Athens, Greece	18th (q)	1.89 m
1999	Pan American Games	Winnipeg, Manitoba, Canada	4th	1.85 m

Note: Results with a q, indicate overall position in qualifying round.

Sporting positions
Preceded by (United States) Tanya Hughes	USA National High Jump Champion; 1994	Succeeded by (United States) Amy Acuff
