= Julia Bennett =

English high jumper (born 1970)

Julia Machin née Bennett
Personal information
- Nationality: British (English)
- Born: 26 March 1970 (age 56) Crawley, Great Britain

Sport
- Sport: Athletics
- Event: high jump
- Club: Epsom and Ewell Harriers

Julia Machin (née Bennett, born 26 March 1970) is a former high jumper who competed for England and Epsom and Ewell Harriers.

== Biography ==
Bennett achieved her best of 1.92 metres on 6 March 1990, when winning at the AAA Indoor Championships at the age of just 19.

Bennett became the British high jump champion after winning the 1990 UK Championships and British AAA Championships title at the 1994 AAA Championships, where in the latter, she set her outdoor best of 1.89 metres on 11 June 1994. Shortly afterwards she represented England at the 1994 Commonwealth Games in Victoria, Canada.

She also has a Heptathlon best of 5747 (1996) and an indoor Pentathlon best of 4297 (1998). The latter score (as of 2022) ranks her 10th on the British all-time list.

Bennett finished second behind Susan Jones at the 2003 AAA Championships.

Having cleared 1.88m aged 35 in 2005, she represented England at the 2006 Commonwealth Games in Melbourne. She went on to break the British masters age 40+ record with 1.78m in 2010, and to equal the British masters 45+ record with 1.65m in 2016.

== International competitions ==
Year	Competition	Venue	Position	Notes
Representing Great Britain
1989	European Junior Championships	Varaždin, Yugoslavia	5th	1.83 m
1990	European Indoor Championships	Glasgow, United Kingdom	15th	1.80 m
1991	Universiade	Sheffield, United Kingdom	9th	1.84 m (1.85 m)
1993	Universiade	Buffalo, United States	14th	1.80 m (1.83 m)
1994	European Cup	Birmingham, United Kingdom	6th	1.85 m
1994	European Championships	Helsinki, Finland	19th (q)	1.85 m
Representing England
1994	Commonwealth Games	Victoria, Canada	7th	1.85 m (1.85 m)
2006	Commonwealth Games	Melbourne, Australia	9th	1.78 m
Results in parentheses () indicate height achieved in qualifying round
