= Sue Rembao =

American high jumper

Personal information
- Nationality: American
- Born: May 15, 1962 (age 64)

Sport
- Sport: Athletics
- Event: High jump

Sue Rembao (née McNeal; born May 15, 1962) is an American athlete. She competed in the women's high jump at the 1992 Summer Olympics.

Rembao attended Carlsbad High School in California, where she was a 1978 high jump state champion as a sophomore. She jumped in college at Cal Poly San Luis Obispo, where she was an NCAA Division II national championship winner. She quit jumping in 1987 and became a teacher, meeting Cal Poly assistant athletic director John Rembao whom she married that year and was coached by. In 1991, she began training again and eventually qualified to represent the United States at the 1992 Summer Olympics.
