= Yolanda Henry =

American high jumper (born 1964)

Personal information
- Born: December 2, 1964 (age 61) Houston, Texas, United States

Sport
- Sport: Track and field
Medal record
Representing United States
Goodwill Games
Silver medal – second place	1990 Seattle	High jump

Yolanda Henry (born December 2, 1964) is a retired American track and field athlete who specialized in the high jump. She represented her country at one outdoor and four indoor World Championships. In addition she won the silver at the 1990 Goodwill Games.

Her personal bests in the event are 2.00 metres outdoors (Seville 1990) and 1.96 metres indoors (New York 1991).

Henry competed for the Abilene Christian Wildcats track and field team in the NCAA.

== International competitions ==
Year	Competition	Venue	Position	Notes
Representing the United States
1989	World Indoor Championships	Budapest, Hungary	9th	1.91 m
1989	Universiade	Duisburg, West Germany	4th	1.88 m
1990	Goodwill Games	Seattle, United States	2nd	1.92 m
1991	World Indoor Championships	Seville, Spain	4th	1.91 m
1991	Universiade	Sheffield, United Kingdom	8th	1.84 m
1991	World Championships	Tokyo, Japan	17th (q)	1.83 m
1993	World Indoor Championships	Toronto, Canada	22nd (q)	1.79 m
1995	World Indoor Championships	Barcelona, Spain	12th (q)	1.90 m^{1}

^{1}No mark in the final
