= Šárka Nováková =

Czech high jumper (born 1971)

Personal information
- Born: 21 February 1971 (age 55) Zlín, Czechoslovakia

Sport
- Sport: Track and field

Šárka Nováková (née Makówková; born 21 February 1971) is a retired Czech high jumper.

She finished thirteenth at the 1991 World Indoor Championships and ninth at the 1991 World Championships. She then competed at the 1992 Olympic Games, 1993 World Championships and the 1995 World Indoor Championships without reaching the final.

Her personal best jump was 1.95 metres, achieved in 1992.
