= Sabine Bramhoff =

German high jumper

Sabine Bramhoff (born 1 November 1964) is a retired German high jumper.

She finished seventh at the 1989 European Indoor Championships. She represented the sports club LC Paderborn, and won the silver medal at the West German champion in 1989.

Her personal best jump was 1.94 metres (6.3 ft), achieved in August 1990 in Düsseldorf.
