= Tatsiana Sheuchyk =

Belarusian high jumper (born 1969)

Tatsiana Sheuchyk (Belarusian: Таццяна Шэўчык; born 11 June 1969) is a retired Belarusian high jumper. She competed at the 1992 Barcelona Olympics. Her other international results include finishing fourth at the 1994 European Indoor Championships, sixth at the 1995 IAAF World Indoor Championships and fifth at the 1995 World Championships.

Her personal best jump is 2.00 metres, achieved in May 1993 in Gomel.

== International competitions ==
Year	Competition	Venue	Position	Notes
Representing Soviet Union
1988	World Junior Championships	Sudbury, Canada	16th (q)	1.75 m
Representing Unified Team
1992	Olympic Games	Barcelona, Spain	16th	1.83 m (1.92m)
Representing Belarus
1993	World Indoor Championships	Toronto, Canada	10th	1.91 m
1994	European Indoor Championships	Paris, France	4th	1.96 m
1995	World Indoor Championships	Barcelona, Spain	6th	1.96 m
1995	World Championships	Gothenburg, Sweden	5th	1.96 m
(q) Indicates overall position in qualifying round
