= Judit Kovács =

Hungarian high jumper

Judit Kovács (7 June 1969 in Debrecen, Hajdú-Bihar, 5 December 2025) is a retired female high jumper from Hungary. Her personal best jump was 1.94 metres, achieved in August 1992 in Budapest.

She finished sixth at the 1990 European Athletics Championships, eighth at the 1991 World Championships and fifth at the 1992 European Athletics Indoor Championships. She also competed at the 1992 Summer Olympics. She became Hungarian champion in 1989, 1990, 1991 and 1992.

== International competitions ==
Year	Competition	Venue	Position	Notes
Hungary
1985	European Junior Championships	Cottbus, Germany	12th	1.75 m (1.79)
1986	World Junior Championships	Athens, Greece	13th (q)	1.74 m
1987	European Junior Championships	Birmingham, United Kingdom	9th	1.75 m
1990	European Championships	Split, Yugoslavia	6th	1.89 m
1991	World Indoor Championships	Seville, Spain	16th (q)	1.84 m
1991	World Championships	Tokyo, Japan	8th	1.90 m
1992	European Indoor Championships	Genoa, Italy	5th	1.88 m
1992	Olympic Games	Spain, Barcelona	17th (q)	1.90 m
1993	World Indoor Championships	Toronto, Canada	18th (q)	1.88 m
1993	World Championships	Stuttgart, Germany	24th (q)	1.84 m

- Results in parentheses (#) indicates superior height achieved in qualifying round.
- Results with a (q) indicates overall position in qualifying round.

== Awards ==
- Hungarian athlete of the Year (1): 1991
