= Birgit Jerschabek =

German long-distance runner

Birgit Jerschabek-Keipke (born 17 May 1969) is a retired (East) German long-distance runner.

She was born in Ludwigslust. As a junior, she won the 10,000 metres at the 1987 European Junior Championships and finished sixth at the 1988 World Junior Championships. She finished sixteenth in 10,000 metres at the 1990 European Championships 65th at the 1990 World Cross Country Championships, fifteenth in the 1992 Olympic marathon and eighth at the 1992 World Half Marathon Championships.

She later competed in three consecutive World Championship marathons without finishing any of them: the 1993, 1995 and 1997 World Championships. Also, she only managed a 48th place at the 1998 World Half Marathon Championships.

In the East German championships she won bronze medals in 1987, 1988 and 1989 (10,000 metres) and silver medals in 1989 (3000) and 1990 (3000, 10,000 and cross-country running). The winner in all events was Kathrin Ullrich. In 1990 she also won a bronze medal (1500 metres) and a silver medal (3000) at the East German indoor championships. She represented the club SC Traktor Schwerin. She later became German half marathon champion in 1991, 1993 and 1997 and marathon champion in 1997. She represented LG Sieg and ABC Ludwigshafen during this part of her career.

Her personal best times were 32:14.75 minutes in the 10,000 metres, achieved in June 1990 in Helsinki; 1:10:53 hours in the half marathon, achieved at the 1992 World Half Marathon Championships; and 2:28:02 hours in the marathon, achieved at the 1995 Lisbon Marathon.
