= Olaf Hense =

German hurdler (born 1967)

Personal information
- Born: 19 November 1967 (age 58) Dortmund, West Germany
Medal record
Men's Athletics
Representing Germany
World Championships
| Bronze medal – third place | 1993 Stuttgart | 4 × 400 m relay |

Olaf Hense (born 19 November 1967) is a retired German hurdler.

He competed at the 1991 World Championships and the 1992 Summer Olympics without reaching the final. He won a bronze medal in the 4 × 400 metres relay at the 1993 World Championships, with teammates Rico Lieder, Karsten Just and Thomas Schönlebe.

His personal best time was 48.48 seconds, achieved in June 1993 in Rome. This ranks him second on the German all-time list, only behind Harald Schmid. Hense represented the sports club LG Olympia Dortmund.
