= Andrea Baumert =

German high jumper

Personal information
- Born: 5 May 1967 (age 59)

Sport
- Sport: Track and field

Andrea Baumert, née Arens (born 5 May 1967) is a retired German high jumper.

She finished fifth at the 1990 European Indoor Championships. She represented the sports club SC Charlottenburg, and became West German champion in 1989.

Her personal best jump was 1.98 metres, achieved in August 1989 in Hamburg.
