= Disa Gísladóttir =

Icelandic athlete

Personal information
- Nationality: Icelandic
- Born: 5 March 1961 (age 64)

Sport
- Sport: Athletics
- Event: High jump

Þórdís "Disa" Lilja Gísladóttir (born 5 March 1961) is an Icelandic athlete. She competed in the women's high jump at the 1976 Summer Olympics and the 1984 Summer Olympics. She was a member of the track and field team at the University of Alabama in Tuscaloosa.

Competing for the Alabama Crimson Tide track and field team, Gísladóttir won the inaugural 1982 and 1983 high jump at the NCAA Division I Outdoor Track and Field Championships.
