= Biljana Petrović =

Yugoslavian high jumper

Personal information
- Born: 28 February 1961 (age 65) Kraljevo, Yugoslavia

Sport
- Sport: Track and field
Medal record
Representing Yugoslavia
European Championships
Silver medal – second place	1990 Split	High jump
Mediterranean Games
Silver medal – second place	1983 Casablanca	High jump
Silver medal – second place	1987 Latakia	High jump

Biljana Petrović (née Bojović; born 28 February 1961) is a retired Serbian high jumper. She set her personal best on 22 June 1990, jumping 2.00 metres at a meet in Saint-Denis, near Paris, France. She competed for Yugoslavia at the 1988 Summer Olympics in Seoul, South Korea, where she finished in 22nd place (1.80 m).

== Achievements ==
Year	Tournament	Venue	Result	Event
1988	Olympic Games	Seoul, South Korea	22nd	1.80 m
1990	European Championships	Split, Yugoslavia	2nd	1.96 m
