= Heike Balck =

German high jumper

Personal information
- Born: 19 August 1970 (age 56) Schwerin, East Germany

Sport
- Sport: Track and field
Medal record
Representing Germany
World Indoor Championships
Bronze medal – third place	1991 Seville	High jump

Heike Balck (born 19 August 1970) is a retired German high jumper.

Her personal best jump of 2.01 metres, achieved in Karl-Marx-Stadt, and her world junior record stood since 1989 until being broken by Yaroslava Mahuchikh in 2019. Balck shared the record with Olga Turchak, who cleared the height in 1986.

She became East German champion in the high jump in 1989 and 1990, representing the club SC Traktor Schwerin.

== Achievements ==
Year	Competition	Venue	Position	Event	Notes
Representing East Germany
1987	European Junior Championships	Birmingham, Great Britain	3rd	High jump	1.84 m
1988	World Junior Championships	Sudbury, Canada	7th	High jump	1.81 m
1989	World Cup	Barcelona, Spain	4th	High jump	1.94 m
1990	European Championships	Split, Yugoslavia	5th	High jump	1.89 m
Representing Germany
1991	World Indoor Championships	Seville, Spain	3rd	High jump	1.94 m
1991	World Championships	Tokyo, Japan	12th	High jump	1.84 m
1993	Universiade	Buffalo, United States	4th	High jump	1.93 m
1994	European Championships	Helsinki, Finland	6th	High jump	1.93 m
1997	World Championships	Athens, Greece	10th	High jump	1.90 m

== See also ==
- Female two metres club
