= Marion Hellmann =

German high jumper

Personal information
- Born: 6 April 1967 (age 59) Linnich, Nordrhein-Westfalen, West Germany

Sport
- Sport: Track and field

Marion Hellmann (née Goldkamp; born 6 April 1967) is a retired German high jumper, who competed for her native country at the 1992 Summer Olympics.

She finished fifth at the 1992 European Indoor Championships, twelfth at the 1993 World Indoor Championships and tenth at the 1994 European Indoor Championships.

Her personal best jump was 1.94 metres, achieved in May 1992 in Ahlen.
