= Birgit Kähler =

German high jumper

Birgit Kähler (born 14 August 1970 in Cologne, Nordrhein-Westfalen) is a retired female high jumper from Germany. Her personal best jump was 1.94 metres, achieved in August 1991 in Bonn.

She finished fifth at the 1991 World Championships and fifth at the 1992 European Indoor Championships. She represented the sports clubs LAV Bayer Uerdingen and TSV Bayer 04 Leverkusen, and won the silver medal at the German championships in 1992.
