= Konrad Dobler =

German long-distance runner (born 1957)

Konrad Waldemar Dobler (born 27 April 1957 in Alt-Asbach, Rotthalmünster, Lower Bavaria) is a former long-distance runner from Germany, who twice represented his native country at the Summer Olympics: 1992 and 1996. He set his personal best time of 2:11:57 in the 1991 London Marathon.

Dobler is a policeman by occupation. He was mayor of Langerringen in Swabia between 2002 and 2020.

== Achievements ==
- All results regarding marathon, unless stated otherwise

Year	Competition	Venue	Position	Notes
Representing West Germany
1990	European Championships	Split, FR Yugoslavia	9th	2:19:36
1990	Frankfurt Marathon	Frankfurt, Germany	1st	2:13:29
Representing Germany
1991	World Championships	Tokyo, Japan	10th	2:19:01
1992	Olympic Games	Barcelona, Spain	49th	2:23:44
1993	World Championships	Stuttgart, Germany	6th	2:18:28
1994	European Championships	Helsinki, Finland	14th	2:14:28
1995	World Championships	Gothenburg, Sweden	14th	2:18:09
1996	Olympic Games	Atlanta, United States	48th	2:21:12
