= Niki Gavera =

Greek high jumper

Personal information
- Nationality: Greek
- Born: 15 April 1967 (age 59) Athens, Greece

Sport
- Sport: Athletics
- Event: High jump
Medal record
Representing Greece
Mediterranean Games
Silver medal – second place	1991 Athens	High jump

Niki Gavera (born 15 April 1967) is a Greek athlete. She competed in the women's high jump at the 1992 Summer Olympics.
