= Heike Henkel =

German high jumper (born 1964)

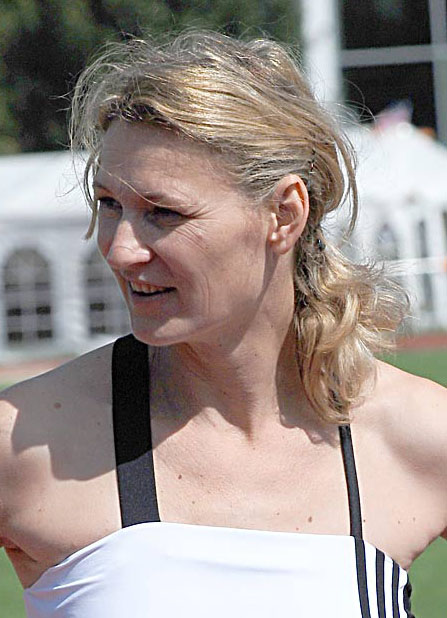
- Heike Henkel

Personal information
- Born: 5 May 1964 (age 62) Kiel, West Germany

Sport
- Sport: Track and field
Medal record
Representing Germany
Olympic Games
| Gold medal – first place | 1992 Barcelona | High jump |
World Championships
| Gold medal – first place | 1991 Tokyo | High jump |
World Indoor Championships
| Gold medal – first place | 1991 Sevilla | High jump |
| Silver medal – second place | 1993 Toronto | High jump |
| Bronze medal – third place | 1989 Budapest | High jump |
| Bronze medal – third place | 1995 Barcelona | High jump |
Representing West Germany
European Championships
| Gold medal – first place | 1990 Split | High jump |

Heike Henkel (German pronunciation: [ˈhaɪkə ˈhɛŋkl̩]; née Redetzky; born 5 May 1964) is a German former athlete competing in high jump. She was an Olympic, World and European champion. She won the high jump gold medal at the 1992 Summer Olympics in Barcelona.

== Biography ==
Having competed for West Germany at the Olympic Games in 1984, where as a 20-year-old she finished eleventh (with a jump of 1.85 meters), and 1988, where she failed to qualify for the final, she emerged as the world's leading female high jumper of the early 1990s. She won the gold medal at the 1990 European Athletics Championships in Split, and the 1991 World Athletics Championships in Tokyo with a then-German record of 2.05 metres. She then won gold at the 1992 Olympic Games in Barcelona with a jump of 2.02 metres. That year, Henkel improved the indoor world record to 2.07 meters at the German Indoor Championships in Karlsruhe and only dipped below 2 metres twice in all her competitions that year (clearing 1.98 metres on both occasions).

She became the first high jumper to become European Champion, World Champion, and Olympic Champion in three consecutive years (1990–1992). She also won World Indoor and European Indoor titles in titles and was a 20-time German champion.

She is one of only four female high jumpers in history to have won all five titles, the other three being Stefka Kostadinova, Mariya Lasitskene and Yaroslava Mahuchikh. In 2021, Lasitskene joined Henkel to became the fourth female high jumper in history (with Kostadinova, and Anna Chicherova) to win gold at both the Olympic Games and the World Championships.

== Personal life ==
Henkel was born in Kiel, Schleswig-Holstein. From 1989 to 2001, she was married to swimmer Rainer Henkel and interrupted her career twice to give birth to their sons Ravn and Morten, in 1994 and 1997.

On 30 April 2004 she married decathlete Paul Meier. Their daughter Marlene Meier is also an athlete and competed for Germany at the 2025 European Athletics Indoor Championships. She earned a degree in graphic design from the Cologne University of Applied Sciences.

== Competition record ==
| Year | Competition | Venue | Position | Notes |
Representing West Germany
| 1981 | European Junior Championships | Utrecht, Netherlands | 5th | 1.84 m |
| 1984 | Olympic Games | Los Angeles, United States | 11th | 1.85 m |
| 1986 | European Championships | Stuttgart, West Germany | 6th | 1.90 m |
| 1987 | European Indoor Championships | Liévin, France | 5th | 1.91 m |
| 1987 | World Indoor Championships | Indianapolis, United States | 6th | 1.91 m |
| 1987 | World Championships | Rome, Italy | 6th | 1.96 m |
| 1988 | European Indoor Championships | Budapest, Hungary | 2nd | 1.97 m |
| 1988 | Olympic Games | Seoul, South Korea | 13th (q) | 1.90 m |
| 1989 | World Indoor Championships | Budapest, Hungary | 3rd | 1.94 m |
| 1990 | European Indoor Championships | Glasgow, United Kingdom | 1st | 2.00 m |
| 1990 | European Championships | Split, Yugoslavia | 1st | 1.99 m |
Representing Germany
| 1991 | World Indoor Championships | Seville, Spain | 1st | 2.00 m |
| 1991 | World Championships | Tokyo, Japan | 1st | 2.05 m |
| 1992 | European Indoor Championships | Genoa, Italy | 1st | 2.02 m |
| 1992 | Olympic Games | Barcelona, Spain | 1st | 2.02 m |
| 1993 | World Indoor Championships | Toronto, Canada | 2nd | 2.02 m |
| 1993 | World Championships | Stuttgart, Germany | 11th (q) | 1.90 m |
| 1994 | European Championships | Helsinki, Finland | 11th | 1.85 m |
| 1995 | World Indoor Championships | Barcelona, Spain | 3rd | 1.99 m |
| 1995 | World Championships | Gothenburg, Sweden | 16th (q) | 1.93 m |
| 2000 | European Indoor Championships | Ghent, Belgium | 8th | 1.85 m |

Note: Henkel was forced to withdraw from the 1993 World Championship final due to injury, having cleared 1.90 m in the qualifying round.

== See also ==
- Female two metres club

Awards
| Preceded by (Jamaica) Merlene Ottey | Women's Track & Field Athlete of the Year; 1991 | Succeeded by (Germany) Heike Drechsler |
| Preceded by (Germany) Katrin Krabbe | German Sportswoman of the Year; 1992 | Succeeded by (Germany) Franziska van Almsick |
Sporting positions
| Preceded by (Soviet Union) Yelena Yelesina | Women's High Jump Best Year Performance; 1991 | Succeeded by (Bulgaria) Stefka Kostadinova |
