= 1988 European Athletics Indoor Championships – Women's high jump =

The women's high jump event at the 1988 European Athletics Indoor Championships was held on 6 March.

== Results ==
Rank	Name	Nationality	1.75	1.80	1.85	1.88	1.91	1.94	1.97	2.00	2.04	2.07	Result	Notes
1st place, gold medalist(s)	Stefka Kostadinova	Bulgaria	–	o	o	–	o	o	o	o	xxo	xxx	2.04	CR
2nd place, silver medalist(s)	Heike Henkel	West Germany	–	o	o	o	o	o	o	xxx			1.97	
3rd place, bronze medalist(s)	Larisa Kositsyna	Soviet Union	–	o	o	o	o	o	o	xxx			1.97	
4	Lyudmila Avdeyenko	Soviet Union	–	xo	o	o	o	xo	xxx				1.94	
5	Emilia Dragieva	Bulgaria	o	o	o	o	o	xxx					1.91	
6	Gabriele Günz	East Germany	o	xo	o	xo	xo	xxr					1.91	
7	Andrea Mátay	Hungary	o	o	o	xo	xxx						1.88	
7	Maryse Éwanjé-Épée	France	–	o	o	xo	xxx						1.88	
9	Debbie McDowell	Great Britain	o	o	o	xxx							1.85	
10	Madely Beaugendre	France	o	xo	o	–	xxx						1.85	
11	Jolanta Komsa	Poland	o	o	xo	xxx							1.85	
12	Niki Bakoyianni	Greece	–	xo	xo	xxx							1.85	
13	Diana Davies	Great Britain	–	o	xxx								1.80	
13	Hanne Haugland	Norway	–	o	xxx								1.80	
13	Katalin Sterk	Hungary	o	o	xxx								1.80	
16	Beáta Viroszt	Hungary	o	xo	xxx								1.80	
	Sigrid Kirchmann	Austria	–	xxx									NM	
