= Athletics at the 1980 Summer Olympics – Women's high jump =

Women's high jump at the Games of the XXII Olympiad
- Venues: Lenin Stadium
- Dates: 25–26 July
- Competitors: 20 from 12 nations
- Winning height: 1.97

Medalists
1st place, gold medalist(s)		Sara Simeoni; Italy
2nd place, silver medalist(s)		Urszula Kielan; Poland
3rd place, bronze medalist(s)		Jutta Kirst; East Germany

The Women's High Jump event at the 1980 Summer Olympics in Moscow, Soviet Union had an entry list of 20 competitors. The final was held on Saturday 1980-07-26. Sara Simeoni took gold in the event, Urszula Kielan won silver, and Jutta Kirst won bronze.

== Medalists ==
Gold	Sara Simeoni; Italy
Silver	Urszula Kielan; Poland
Bronze	Jutta Kirst; East Germany

== Results ==
=== Qualification ===
- Held on Friday July 25, 1980

Rank	Group	Name	Nationality	1.70	1.75	1.80	1.85	1.88	Result	Notes
1	A	Rosemarie Ackermann	East Germany	–	o	o	o	o	1.88	Q
1	A	Urszula Kielan	Poland	–	o	o	o	o	1.88	Q
1	A	Andrea Mátay	Hungary	–	o	o	o	o	1.88	Q
1	A	Marina Sysoyeva	Soviet Union	–	o	o	o	o	1.88	Q
5	A	Louise Miller	Great Britain	–	o	o	xo	o	1.88	Q
5	B	Chris Soetewey	Belgium	–	o	xo	o	o	1.88	Q
7	A	Tamara Bykova	Soviet Union	–	o	o	o	xo	1.88	Q
7	A	Jutta Kirst	East Germany	–	o	o	o	xo	1.88	Q
7	A	Sara Simeoni	Italy	–	o	o	o	xo	1.88	Q
10	B	Christine Stanton	Australia	o	o	o	o	xo	1.88	Q
11	B	Cornelia Popa	Romania	–	xo	o	xo	xo	1.88	Q
12	A	Andrea Reichstein	East Germany	–	o	o	o	xxo	1.88	Q
13	A	Elżbieta Krawczuk	Poland	–	o	o	o	xxx	1.85	
14	B	Danuta Bułkowska	Poland	o	o	o	o	xxx	1.85	
15	B	Susanne Lorentzon	Sweden	o	o	o	xo	xxx	1.85	
16	B	Yordanka Blagoeva	Bulgaria	–	o	o	xxx		1.80	
16	B	Marina Serkova	Soviet Union	–	o	o	xxx		1.80	
18	B	Ann-Ewa Karlsson	Sweden	o	xo	o	xxx		1.80	
19	B	Lidija Benedetič-Lapajne	Yugoslavia	–	o	xo	xxx		1.80	
	B	Dia Toutingi	Syria	xxx					NM	

=== Final ===
- Held on Saturday July 26, 1980

Rank	Name	Nationality	1.75	1.80	1.85	1.88	1.91	1.94	1.97	2.02	Result	Notes
1st place, gold medalist(s)	Sara Simeoni	Italy	–	o	o	–	o	o	xo	xxx	1.97	OR
2nd place, silver medalist(s)	Urszula Kielan	Poland	–	o	–	o	o	o	xxx		1.94	
3rd place, bronze medalist(s)	Jutta Kirst	East Germany	o	o	xo	o	xxo	xo	xxx		1.94	
4	Rosemarie Ackermann	East Germany	o	o	o	o	o	xxx			1.91	
5	Marina Sysoyeva	Soviet Union	–	o	o	o	xo	xxx			1.91	
6	Andrea Reichstein	East Germany	o	o	o	o	xo	xxx			1.91	
6	Christine Stanton	Australia	o	o	o	o	xo	xxx			1.91	
8	Cornelia Popa	Romania	–	o	o	o	xxx				1.88	
9	Tamara Bykova	Soviet Union	–	o	o	xo	xxx				1.88	
10	Andrea Mátay	Hungary	–	–	o	xxx					1.85	
11	Louise Miller	Great Britain	xo	o	o	xxx					1.85	
12	Chris Soetewey	Belgium	o	o	xxx						1.80	

== See also ==
- 1976 Women's Olympic High Jump (Montreal)
- 1978 Women's European Championships High Jump (Prague)
- 1982 Women's European Championships High Jump (Athens)
- 1983 Women's World Championships High Jump (Helsinki)
- 1984 Women's Olympic High Jump (Los Angeles)
- 1984 Women's Friendship Games High Jump (Prague)
- 1986 Women's European Championships High Jump (Stuttgart)
- 1987 Women's World Championships High Jump (Rome)
