= 1987 European Athletics Indoor Championships – Women's high jump =

The women's high jump event at the 1987 European Athletics Indoor Championships was held on 22 February.

== Results ==
Rank	Name	Nationality	1.75	1.80	1.85	1.88	1.91	1.94	1.97	2.00	Result	Notes
1st place, gold medalist(s)	Stefka Kostadinova	Bulgaria	–	o	o	–	o	o	o	xxx	1.97	
2nd place, silver medalist(s)	Tamara Bykova	Soviet Union	–	–	xo	o	o	o	xxx		1.94	
3rd place, bronze medalist(s)	Susanne Beyer	East Germany	–	o	o	o	o	xxx			1.91	
3rd place, bronze medalist(s)	Elżbieta Trylińska	Poland	–	o	o	o	o	xxx			1.91	
5	Heike Redetzky	West Germany	–	o	o	o	xo	xxx			1.91	
6	Janet Boyle	Great Britain	o	xo	xo	o	xxo	xxx			1.91	
7	Danuta Bułkowska	Poland	–	o	o	o	xxx				1.88	
7	Emilia Dragieva	Bulgaria	–	o	o	o	xxx				1.88	
7	Katalin Sterk	Hungary	o	o	o	o	xxx				1.88	
10	Jana Brenkusová	Czechoslovakia									1.88	
11	Hanne Haugland	Norway									1.88	=NR
12	Ringa Ropo	Finland									1.85	
12	Svetlana Isaeva	Bulgaria									1.85	
14	Diana Davies	Great Britain									1.85	
14	Chris Soetewey	Belgium									1.85	
16	Sigrid Kirchmann	Austria									1.85	
17	Christina Nordström	Sweden									1.80	
	Madely Beaugendre	France									DNS	
