= 1989 IAAF World Indoor Championships – Women's high jump =

The women's high jump event at the 1989 IAAF World Indoor Championships was held at the Budapest Sportcsarnok in Budapest on 4 and 5 March.

== Medallists ==
Gold	Silver	Bronze
Stefka Kostadinova; Bulgaria (BUL)	Tamara Bykova; Soviet Union (URS)	Heike Redetzky; West Germany (FRG)

== Results ==
=== Qualification ===
Qualification: 1.84 metres (Q) or the best 12 (q) qualified for the final

Rank	Name	Nationality	Result	Notes
1	Stefka Kostadinova	Bulgaria	1.84	Q
1	Megumi Sato	Japan	1.84	Q
1	Kim Hee-sun	South Korea	1.84	Q
1	Maryse Ewanjé-Epée	France	1.84	Q
1	Hanne Haugland	Norway	1.84	Q
1	Yolanda Henry	United States	1.84	Q
1	Gail Kapernick	Australia	1.84	Q
1	Jan Chesbro-Wohlschlag	United States	1.84	Q
1	Madely Beaugendre	France	1.84	Q
1	Alina Astafei	Romania	1.84	Q
1	Dimitrina Miloucheva	Bulgaria	1.84	Q
1	Tamara Bykova	Soviet Union	1.84	Q
1	Olga Turchak	Soviet Union	1.84	Q
14	Biljana Petrović	Yugoslavia	1.84	Q
15	Krisztina Solti	Hungary	1.84	Q
16	Natalia Jonckheere	Belgium	1.84	Q
17	Su Chun-yueh	Chinese Taipei	1.84	Q, NR
17	Heike Redetzky	West Germany	1.84	Q
19	Cristina Fink	Mexico	1.84	Q
20	Niki Bakoyianni	Greece	1.79	

=== Final ===
Rank	Name	Nationality	1.80	1.85	1.88	1.91	1.94	1.97	2.00	2.02	Result	Notes
1st place, gold medalist(s)	Stefka Kostadinova	Bulgaria	o	o	o	o	o	o	o	o	2.02	
2nd place, silver medalist(s)	Tamara Bykova	Soviet Union	o	o	o	o	xo	xo	xxo		2.00	
3rd place, bronze medalist(s)	Heike Redetzky	West Germany	o	o	o	o	o	xxx			1.94	
4	Biljana Petrović	Yugoslavia	o	o	o	o	xo	xx			1.94	NR
5	Jan Chesbro-Wohlschlag	United States	o	o	o	o	xxx				1.91	
6	Gail Kapernick	Australia	o	o	xo	o	xxx				1.91	PB
7	Madely Beaugendre	France	xxo	o	xo	o	xxx				1.91	
8	Olga Turchak	Soviet Union	o	o	o	xo	xx				1.91	
9	Yolanda Henry	United States	xo	xo	xo	xo	xxx				1.91	
10	Alina Astafei	Romania	o	o	o	xxo					1.91	
11	Hanne Haugland	Norway	o	xxo	o	xx					1.88	
12	Natalia Jonckheere	Belgium	xo	xo	xo	xx					1.88	
13	Megumi Sato	Japan	o	o	x						1.85	
13	Dimitrina Miloucheva	Bulgaria		o	xx						1.85	
13	Maryse Ewanjé-Epée	France	o	o	x						1.85	
16	Krisztina Solti	Hungary	xo	o	xx						1.85	
17	Kim Hee-sun	South Korea	o	xxo	xx						1.85	
18	Cristina Fink	Mexico									1.80	
	Su Chun-yueh	Chinese Taipei									NM	
