= 1982 European Athletics Championships – Women's high jump =

1982 athletic event

Women's high jump at the European Athletics Championships

These are the official results of the Women's High Jump event at the 1982 European Championships in Athens, Greece, held at the Olympic Stadium "Spiros Louis" on 7 and 8 September 1982.

== Medalists ==
Gold	Ulrike Meyfarth; West Germany
Silver	Tamara Bykova; Soviet Union
Bronze	Sara Simeoni; Italy

== Results ==
=== Final ===
8 September

Rank	Name	Nationality	Result	Notes
1st place, gold medalist(s)	Ulrike Meyfarth	West Germany	2.02	WR
2nd place, silver medalist(s)	Tamara Bykova	Soviet Union	1.97	
3rd place, bronze medalist(s)	Sara Simeoni	Italy	1.97	
4	Gaby Meier	Switzerland	1.94	
5	Jutta Kirst	East Germany	1.94	
6	Andrea Bienias	East Germany	1.91	
6	Lyudmila Zhecheva	Bulgaria	1.91	
8	Katalin Sterk	Hungary	1.91	
9	Emese Béla	Hungary	1.88	
10	Maryse Éwanjé-Épée	France	1.88	
11	Barbara Simmonds	United Kingdom	1.88	
12	Susanne Lorentzon	Sweden	1.88	

=== Qualification ===
7 September

Rank	Name	Nationality	Result	Notes
	Emese Béla	Hungary	1.88	Q
	Lyudmila Zhecheva	Bulgaria	1.88	Q
	Maryse Éwanjé-Épée	France	1.88	Q
	Susanne Lorentzon	Sweden	1.88	Q
	Sara Simeoni	Italy	1.88	Q
	Gaby Meier	Switzerland	1.88	Q
	Tamara Bykova	Soviet Union	1.88	Q
	Katalin Sterk	Hungary	1.88	Q
	Ulrike Meyfarth	West Germany	1.88	Q
	Barbara Simmonds	United Kingdom	1.88	Q
	Andrea Bienias	East Germany	1.88	Q
	Jutta Kirst	East Germany	1.88	Q
	Christine Soetewey	Belgium	1.85	
	Astrid Tveit	Norway	1.85	
	Sandra Dini	Italy	1.85	
	Brigitte Holzapfel	West Germany	1.85	
	Lidija Benedetič	Yugoslavia	1.85	
	Disa Gísladóttir	Iceland	1.80	
	Alexandra Batatoli	Greece	1.70	

== Participation ==
According to an unofficial count, 19 athletes from 15 countries participated in the event.

- Belgium (1)
- Bulgaria (1)
- East Germany (2)
- France (1)
- Greece (1)
- Hungary (2)
- Iceland (1)
- Italy (2)
- Norway (1)
- Soviet Union (1)
- Sweden (1)
- Switzerland (1)
- United Kingdom (1)
- West Germany (2)
- Yugoslavia (1)

== See also ==
- 1978 Women's European Championships High Jump (Prague)
- 1980 Women's Olympic High Jump (Moscow)
- 1983 Women's World Championships High Jump (Helsinki)
- 1984 Women's Olympic High Jump (Los Angeles)
- 1986 Women's European Championships High Jump (Stuttgart)
- 1987 Women's World Championships High Jump (Rome)
- 1988 Women's Olympic High Jump (Seoul)
