= 1986 European Athletics Championships – Women's high jump =

Women's high jump at the European Athletics Championships

These are the official results of the Women's high jump event at the 1986 European Championships in Stuttgart, West Germany, held at Neckarstadion on 27 and 28 August 1986.

== Medalists ==
Gold	Stefka Kostadinova; Bulgaria
Silver	Svetlana Isaeva; Bulgaria
Bronze	Olga Turchak; Soviet Union

== Results ==
=== Qualification ===
27 August

Rank	Name	Nationality	Result	Notes
	Stefka Kostadinova	Bulgaria	1.91	Q
	Svetlana Isaeva	Bulgaria	1.89	Q
	Heike Redetzky	West Germany	1.89	Q
	Sigrid Kirchmann	Austria	1.89	Q
	Diana Davies	Great Britain	1.89	Q
	Elżbieta Trylińska	Poland	1.89	Q
	Danuta Bułkowska	Poland	1.89	Q
	Larisa Kositsyna	Soviet Union	1.89	Q
	Olga Juha	Hungary	1.89	Q
	Susanne Helm	East Germany	1.89	Q
	Andrea Bienias	East Germany	1.89	Q
	Olga Turchak	Soviet Union	1.89	Q
	Brigitte Rougeron	France	1.86	
	Katalin Sterk	Hungary	1.86	
	Sara Simeoni	Italy	1.86	
	Tamara Bykova	Soviet Union	1.86	
	Christina Nordström	Sweden	1.86	
	Madely Beaugendre	France	1.86	
	Janet Boyle	Great Britain	1.83	
	Susanne Lorentzon	Sweden	1.80	
	Maryse Éwanjé-Épée	France	1.80	
	Sharon McPeake	Great Britain	1.76	

=== Final ===
28 August

Rank	Name	Nationality	1.75	1.79	1.83	1.87	1.90	1.93	1.96	1.98	2.00	2.04	Result	Notes
1st place, gold medalist(s)	Stefka Kostadinova	Bulgaria	–	–	o	o	o	o	xo	–	xxo	xxx	2.00	
2nd place, silver medalist(s)	Svetlana Isaeva	Bulgaria											1.93	
3rd place, bronze medalist(s)	Olga Turchak	Soviet Union											1.93	
4	Andrea Bienias	East Germany											1.90	
4	Susanne Helm	East Germany						xxx					1.90	
6	Heike Redetzky	West Germany	–	o	o	xxo	o	xxx					1.90	
7	Danuta Bułkowska	Poland											1.90	
8	Diana Davies	Great Britain											1.87	
9	Larisa Kositsyna	Soviet Union											1.83	
9	Olga Juha	Hungary											1.83	
11	Sigrid Kirchmann	Austria	–	o	xxx								1.79	
	Elżbieta Trylińska	Poland											NM	

== Participation ==
According to an unofficial count, 22 athletes from 11 countries participated in the event.

- Austria (1)
- Bulgaria (2)
- East Germany (2)
- France (3)
- Hungary (2)
- Italy (1)
- Poland (2)
- Soviet Union (3)
- Sweden (2)
- Great Britain (3)
- West Germany (1)

== See also ==
- 1980 Women's Olympic High Jump (Moscow)
- 1982 Women's European Championships High Jump (Athens)
- 1983 Women's World Championships High Jump (Helsinki)
- 1984 Women's Olympic High Jump (Los Angeles)
- 1987 Women's World Championships High Jump (Rome)
- 1988 Women's Olympic High Jump (Seoul)
- 1990 Women's European Championships High Jump (Split)
