= 1986 European Athletics Indoor Championships – Women's high jump =

The women's high jump event at the 1986 European Athletics Indoor Championships was held on 23 February.

== Results ==
Rank	Name	Nationality	1.75	1.80	1.85	1.90	1.94	1.97	2.00	Result	Notes
1st place, gold medalist(s)	Andrea Bienias	East Germany	–	o	o	o	xo	xo	xxx	1.97	
2nd place, silver medalist(s)	Gabriele Günz	East Germany	–	o	o	o	o	xxx		1.94	
3rd place, bronze medalist(s)	Larisa Kositsyna	Soviet Union	–	o	o	xo	xo	xxx		1.94	
4	Diana Davies	Great Britain	–	o	o	o	xxx			1.90	
5	Maryse Éwanjé-Épée	France	–	xo	o	o	xxx			1.90	
5	Alessandra Fossati	Italy	o	o	xo	o	xxx			1.90	
7	Svetlana Isaeva	Bulgaria	o	o	o	xxx				1.85	
8	Susanne Lorentzon	Sweden	o	xo	o	xxx				1.85	
9	Urszula Kielan	Poland	–	o	xo	xxx				1.85	
9	Covandonga Mateos	Spain	o	o	xo	xxx				1.85	
11	Samra Tanović	Yugoslavia	o	o	xxx					1.80	
11	Sigrid Kirchmann	Austria	–	o	xxx					1.80	
