= 1987 World Championships in Athletics – Women's high jump =

Video on YouTube Official video

These are the official results of the Women's High Jump event at the 1987 IAAF World Championships in Rome, Italy. There were a total number of 24 participating athletes, with two qualifying groups and the final held on Sunday August 30, 1987.

== Summary ==
Stefka Kostadinova came into the competition as the world record holder at 2.08m and favorite, but it was not going to be uncontested. Soviet Tamara Bykova was the defending champion and the woman Kostadinova replaced as world record holder, her Bulgarian teammate, Lyudmila Andonova was also a finalist, though she was untested following a 2-year doping suspension.

By 2.02m the rest of the competition had topped out, the last being Susanne Beyer clearing 1.99m, Bykova and Kostadinova still having a clean round. Jumping first, Bykova continued clean at 2.04m, but Kostadinova took three tries to stay alive in the competition, putting Bykova in the driver's seat. After Bykova missed a second time at 2.06m, Kostadinova cleared, taking the lead. Bykova passed to take a heroic attempt to equal the world record, 3 cm over her personal best, her only chance for the win. Bykova missed and the medals were settled.

Having nothing to gain from equalling her own world record, Kostadinova passed to 2.09 m (6 ft 10 1/4 in). On her second attempt, she went over. Kostadinova's world record has stood until July 2024.

== Medalists ==
| Gold | Stefka Kostadinova; Bulgaria (BUL) |
| Silver | Tamara Bykova; Soviet Union (URS) |
| Bronze | Susanne Beyer; East Germany (GDR) |

== Schedule ==
- All times are Central European Time (UTC+1)

Qualification Round
| Group A | Group B |
|---|---|
| 29.08.1987 – ??:??h | 29.08.1987 – ??:??h |
Final Round
30.08.1987 – 16:30h

== Abbreviations ==
- All results shown are in metres

| Q | automatic qualification |
| q | qualification by rank |
| DNS | did not start |
| NM | no mark |
| WR | world record |
| AR | area record |
| NR | national record |
| PB | personal best |
| SB | season best |

== Records ==
Standing records prior to the 1987 World Athletics Championships
| World Record | Stefka Kostadinova (BUL) | 2.08 m | May 31, 1986 | Sofia, Bulgaria |
| Event Record | Tamara Bykova (URS) | 2.01 m | August 9, 1983 | Helsinki, Finland |
Broken records during the 1987 World Athletics Championships
| World Record | Stefka Kostadinova (BUL) | 2.09 m | August 30, 1987 | Rome, Italy |
| Event Record | Stefka Kostadinova (BUL) | 2.09 m | August 30, 1987 | Rome, Italy |

== Results ==
=== Qualifying round ===
- Held on Saturday 1987-08-29

| Rank | Group | Name | Nationality | 1.80 | 1.85 | 1.88 | 1.91 | Result | Notes |
|---|---|---|---|---|---|---|---|---|---|
| 1 | A | Heike Redetzky | West Germany | | | | | 1.91 | q |
| 1 | A | Lyudmila Avdeyenko | Soviet Union | | | | | 1.91 | q |
| 1 | A | Coleen Sommer | United States | | | | | 1.91 | q |
| 1 | A | Silvia Costa | Cuba | | | | | 1.91 | q |
| 1 | A | Stefka Kostadinova | Bulgaria | | | | | 1.91 | q |
| 1 | A | Madely Beaugendre | France | | | | | 1.91 | q |
| 7 | A | Amra Temim | Yugoslavia | | | | | 1.88 | |
| 7 | A | Ni Xiuling | China | | | | | 1.88 | |
| 7 | A | Kim Hee-sun | South Korea | | | | | 1.88 | |
| 7 | A | Galina Astafei | Romania | | | | | 1.88 | |
| 11 | A | Alessandra Bonfiglioli | Italy | | | | | 1.85 | |
| | A | Sigrid Kirchmann | Austria | | | | | NM | |
| 1 | A | Louise Ritter | United States | | | | | 1.91 | q |
| 1 | A | Susanne Beyer | East Germany | | | | | 1.91 | q |
| 1 | A | Lyudmila Andonova | Bulgaria | | | | | 1.91 | q |
| 1 | A | Svetlana Isaeva-Leseva | Bulgaria | | | | | 1.91 | q |
| 1 | A | Tamara Bykova | Soviet Union | | | | | 1.91 | q |
| 1 | A | Larisa Kositsyna | Soviet Union | | | | | 1.91 | q |
| 7 | A | Megumi Sato | Japan | | | | | 1.88 | |
| 7 | A | Christine Stanton | Australia | | | | | 1.88 | |
| 9 | A | Phyllis Bluntson | United States | | | | | 1.85 | |
| 9 | A | Hanne Haugland | Norway | | | | | 1.85 | |
| 11 | A | Disa Gísladóttir | Iceland | | | | | 1.80 | |
| 11 | A | Orlane Maria dos Santos | Brazil | | | | | 1.80 | |

=== Final ===
| Rank | Name | Nationality | 1.80 | 1.85 | 1.90 | 1.93 | 1.96 | 1.99 | 2.02 | 2.04 | 2.06 | 2.08 | 2.09 | Result | Notes |
|---|---|---|---|---|---|---|---|---|---|---|---|---|---|---|---|
| 1st place, gold medalist(s) | Stefka Kostadinova | Bulgaria | – | o | o | – | o | o | o | xxo | xo | – | xo | 2.09 | WR |
| 2nd place, silver medalist(s) | Tamara Bykova | Soviet Union | – | o | o | o | o | o | o | o | xx– | x | | 2.04 | |
| 3rd place, bronze medalist(s) | Susanne Beyer | East Germany | o | o | o | o | o | xo | xxx | | | | | 1.99 | |
| 4 | Silvia Costa | Cuba | – | o | o | o | o | xx- | x | | | | | 1.96 | |
| 5 | Larisa Kositsyna | Soviet Union | – | o | o | xxo | o | xxx | | | | | | 1.96 | |
| 6 | Heike Redetzky | West Germany | – | o | o | o | xo | xxx | | | | | | 1.96 | |
| 7 | Svetlana Isaeva-Leseva | Bulgaria | – | o | o | o | xxx | | | | | | | 1.93 | |
| 8 | Lyudmila Avdeyenko | Soviet Union | – | xo | o | o | xxx | | | | | | | 1.93 | |
| 8 | Louise Ritter | United States | – | o | xo | o | xxx | | | | | | | 1.93 | |
| 10 | Madely Beaugendre | France | o | o | o | xo | xxx | | | | | | | 1.93 | |
| 11 | Coleen Sommer | United States | – | o | xxo | xxx | | | | | | | | 1.93 | |
| 12 | Lyudmila Andonova | Bulgaria | o | o | xxx | | | | | | | | | 1.85 | |

== See also ==
- National champions high jump (women)
- 1984 Women's Olympic High Jump (Los Angeles)
- 1984 Women's Friendship Games High Jump (Prague)
- 1986 Women's European Championships High Jump (Stuttgart)
- 1988 Women's Olympic High Jump (Seoul)
- 1990 Women's European Championships High Jump (Split)
- 1991 Women's World Championships High Jump (Tokyo)
