= Hochsprung mit Musik =

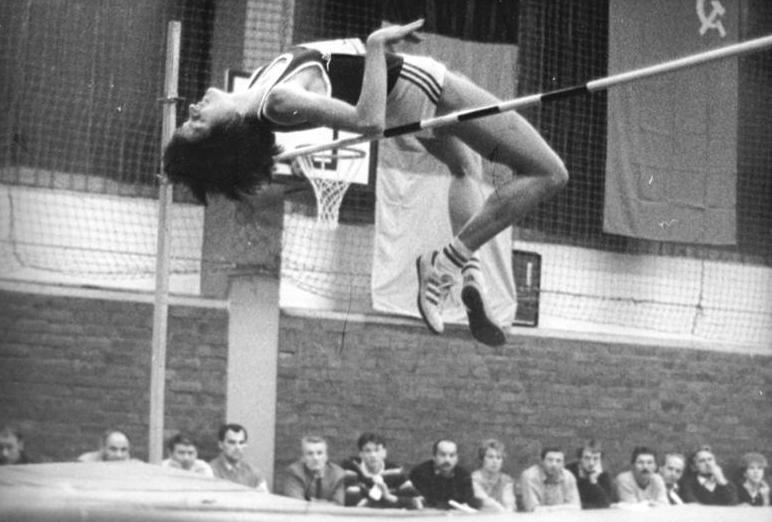
- Susanne Beyer en route to winning the 1987 high jump meeting
- Date: Early February
- Location: Arnstadt, Germany
- Event type: High jump
- Established: 1977
- Website: Hochsprung mit Musik

The Hochsprung mit Musik (English: High Jump with Music) is an annual indoor high jump meeting which takes place in February in Arnstadt, Germany.

First held in 1977, the meeting began as a competition between mainly East German athletes. Following the Re-unification of Germany in 1990, the competition became international and attracted athletes such as Olympic and World champion Charles Austin and Olympic silver medallist Alina Astafei. Both the world record holders (Javier Sotomayor and Stefka Kostadinova) have taken part in, and won, the meeting.

The Hochsprung mit Musik gets its name from the fact that music is played in the Sporthalle am Jahn-sportpark while athletes take their jump. It is used as a way of both building suspense and mirroring the steady rhythm needed by athletes to achieve a high jump.

The competition received greater exposure from the 2000s onwards as the winning athletes' jumps were of a significant height. This was exemplified by Kajsa Bergqvist's winning jump in 2006 of 2.08 metres – an indoor world record for the event and second only to Kostadinova's current world record of 2.09 m. Blanka Vlašić's win in 2010 with 2.06 m was the joint third highest indoor jump. A number of other indoor jumps by female athletes remain within the top 30 highest of all time, and jumps by male athletes frequently make the year's indoor best lists.

On February 8, 2014, the event took place for the 38th and final time after no successor was found for the outgoing assembly director, Hubertus Triebel.

== Past winners ==
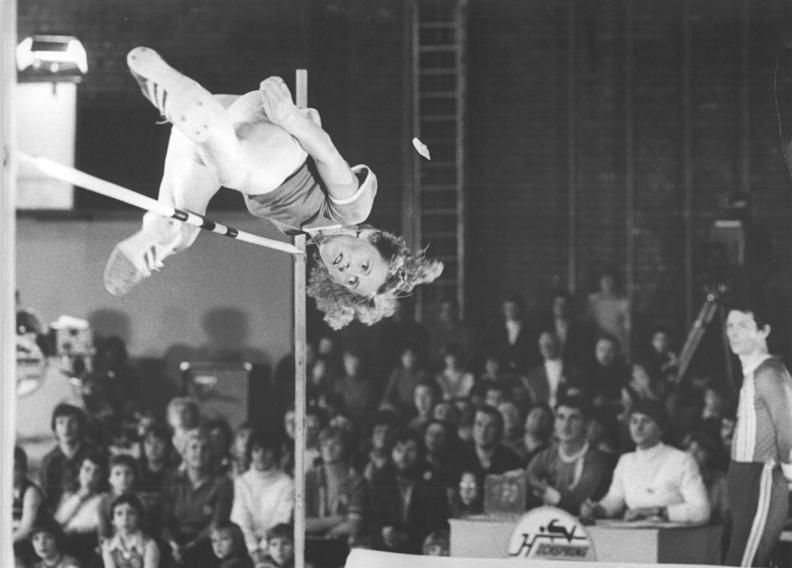
Rosemarie Ackermann won the women's title in 1980.

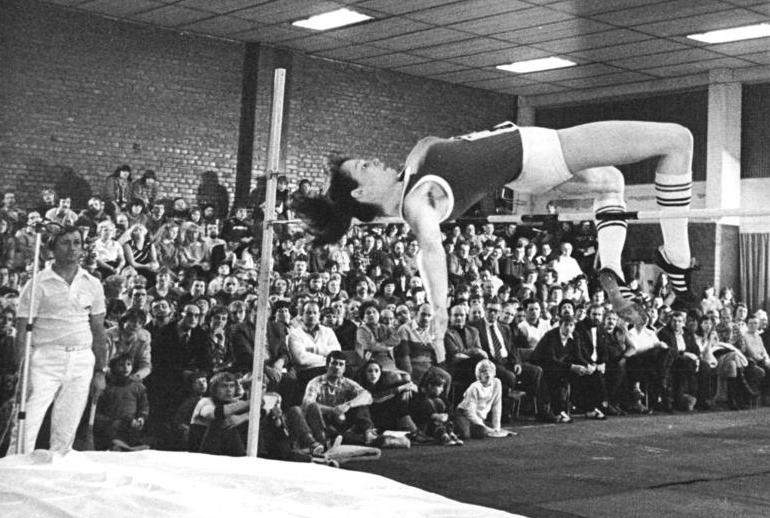
Andrea Bienias (above) and Rolf Beilschmidt (below) each won the competition three times.

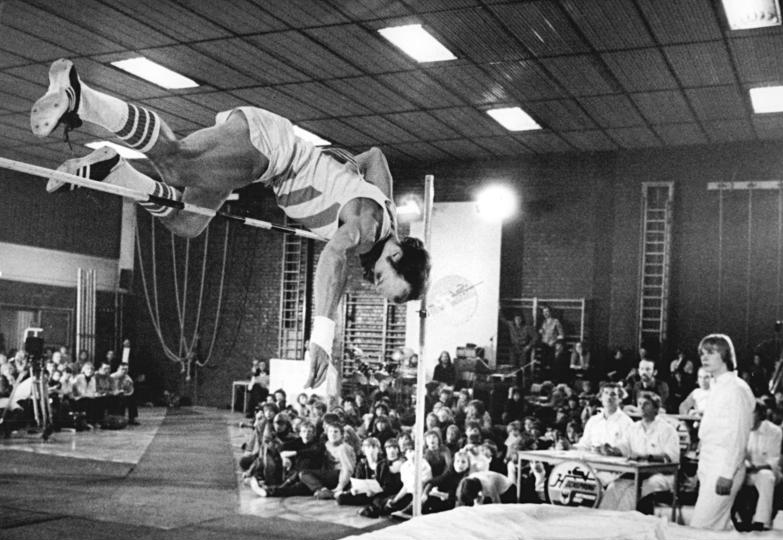

Key: Meeting record

Year	Men's winner	Mark (m)	Women's winner	Mark (m)
1977	Henry Lauterbach (GDR)	2.15	Martina Baumbach (GDR)	1.70
1978	Rolf Beilschmidt (GDR)	2.18	Almut Berg (GDR)	1.75
1979	Henry Lauterbach (GDR)	2.26	Kristine Nitzsche (GDR)	1.86
1980	Henry Lauterbach (GDR)	2.23	Rosemarie Ackermann (GDR)	1.94
1981	Rolf Beilschmidt (GDR)	2.24	Andrea Bienias (GDR)	1.87
1982	Rolf Beilschmidt (GDR)	2.20	Andrea Bienias (GDR)	1.90
1983	Carsten Siebert (GDR)	2.20	Susanne Helm (GDR)	1.87
1984	Gerd Wessig (GDR)	2.27	Heike Grabe (GDR)	1.88
1985	Georgi Gadiev (BUL)	2.22	Susanne Helm (GDR)	1.95
1986	Gerd Wessig (GDR)	2.28	Andrea Bienias (GDR)	1.97
1987	Mathias Grebenstein (GDR)	2.24	Susanne Beyer (GDR)	2.00
1988	Gerd Wessig (GDR)	2.28	Kerstin Kraeft (GDR)	1.86
1989	Gerd Wessig (GDR)	2.24	Britta Vörös (GDR)	1.84
1990	Carlo Thränhardt (FRG)	2.30	Angela Barylla (GDR)	1.85
1991	Sorin Matei (ROU)	2.30	Heike Henkel (GER)	1.99
1992	Sorin Matei (ROU)	2.34	Heike Henkel (GER)	1.98
1993	Charles Austin (USA)	2.35	Heike Henkel (GER)	2.00
1994	Ralf Sonn (GER)	2.31	Alina Astafei (ROU)	1.97
1995	Sorin Matei (ROU)	2.31	Heike Henkel (GER)	1.95
1996	Javier Sotomayor (CUB)	2.36	Alina Astafei (ROU)	2.02
1996	Javier Sotomayor (CUB)	2.36	Stefka Kostadinova (BUL)	2.02
1997	Wolfgang Kreissig (GER)	2.30	Stefka Kostadinova (BUL)	1.96
1998	Charles Austin (USA)	2.30	Amy Acuff (USA)	1.93
1999	Tomáš Janků (CZE)	2.31	Monica Iagăr (ROU)	1.96
2000	Vyacheslav Voronin (RUS)	2.34	Vita Styopina (UKR)	1.94
2001	Andriy Sokolovsky (UKR)	2.35	Vita Palamar (UKR)	1.96
2002	Pyotr Brayko (RUS)	2.31	Marina Kuptsova (RUS)	2.00
2003	Stefan Holm (SWE)	2.36	Marina Kuptsova (RUS)	2.02
2004	Stefan Holm (SWE)	2.36	Anna Chicherova (RUS)	2.04
2005	Jaroslav Rybakov (RUS)	2.37	Anna Chicherova (RUS)	2.00
2006	Jaroslav Rybakov (RUS)	2.37	Kajsa Bergqvist (SWE)	2.08 WR
2007	Jaroslav Rybakov (RUS)	2.38	Anna Chicherova (RUS)	1.98
2008	Andrey Silnov (RUS)	2.37	Blanka Vlašić (CRO)	2.03
2009	Ivan Ukhov (RUS)	2.36	Ariane Friedrich (GER)	2.02
2010	Ivan Ukhov (RUS)	2.35	Blanka Vlašić (CRO)	2.06
2011	Ivan Ukhov (RUS)	2.34	Svetlana Shkolina (RUS)	1.95
2012	Aleksey Dmitrik (RUS)	2.30	Anna Chicherova (RUS)	2.06
2013	Aleksey Dmitrik (RUS)	2.36	Tia Hellebaut (BEL)	1.96
2014	Ivan Ukhov (RUS)	2.40	Kamila Lićwinko (POL)	2.00

== See also ==
- Internationales Hochsprung-Meeting Eberstadt
- Women's high jump world record progression
