= 1983 World Championships in Athletics – Women's high jump =

These are the official results of the Women's High Jump event at the 1983 IAAF World Championships in Helsinki, Finland. There were a total number of 33 participating athletes, with two qualifying groups and the final held on Tuesday August 9, 1983.

== Medalists ==
Gold	Tamara Bykova; Soviet Union (URS)
Silver	Ulrike Meyfarth; West Germany (FRG)
Bronze	Louise Ritter; United States (USA)

== Schedule ==
- All times are Eastern European Time (UTC+2)

Qualification Round
Group A	Group B
07.08.1983 – ??:??h	07.08.1983 – ??:??h
Final Round
09.08.1983 – ??:??h

== Records ==
Standing records prior to the 1983 World Athletics Championships
World Record	Ulrike Meyfarth (FRG)	2.02 m	September 8, 1982	Athens, Greece
Event Record	New event			

== Results ==
=== Qualifying round ===
- Held on Qualification Sunday 1983-08-07

Rank	Group	Name	Nationality	1.50	1.70	1.75	1.80	1.84	1.87	1.90	Result	Notes
1	A	Kerstin Brandt	East Germany								1.90	Q
1	A	Coleen Sommer	United States								1.90	Q
1	A	Tamara Bykova	Soviet Union								1.90	Q
4	A	Susanne Helm	East Germany								1.90	Q
5	A	Christine Soetewey	Belgium								1.87	q
6	A	Minna Vehmasto	Finland								1.87	q
6	A	Katalin Sterk	Hungary								1.87	q
8	A	Zheng Dazhen	China								1.87	q
9	A	Sara Simeoni	Italy	–	–	o	o	o	xr		1.84	
10	A	Gillian Evans	Great Britain								1.84	
11	A	Gaby Meier-Lindenthal	Switzerland								1.84	
11	A	Brigitte Reid	Canada								1.84	
13	A	Disa Gísladóttir	Iceland								1.80	
13	A	Megumi Sato	Japan								1.80	
15	A	Christine Stanton	Australia								1.80	
16	A	Iona Smith	Antigua and Barbuda								1.50	
1	B	Ulrike Meyfarth	West Germany								1.90	Q
2	B	Louise Ritter	United States								1.90	Q
3	B	Andrea Bienias	East Germany								1.90	Q
4	B	Debbie Brill	Canada								1.90	Q
5	B	Olga Juha	Hungary								1.87	q
6	B	Larisa Kositsyna	Soviet Union								1.87	q
7	B	Maryse Ewanjé-Epée	France								1.87	q
8	B	Vanessa Browne	Australia								1.87	q
8	B	Silvia Costa	Cuba								1.87	q
8	B	Yang Wenqin	China								1.87	q
11	B	Niculina Vasile	Romania								1.84	
12	B	Emese Bela	Hungary								1.80	
13	B	Susanne Lorentzon	Sweden								1.80	
14	B	Lidija Lapajne	Yugoslavia								1.80	
15	B	Hisayo Fukumitsu	Japan								1.75	
16	B	Kawther Akremi	Tunisia								1.70	
17	B	Klodeta Gjini	Albania								1.70	

=== Final ===
Rank	Name	Nationality	1.75	1.80	1.84	1.88	1.92	1.95	1.97	1.99	2.01	2.03	Result	Notes
1st place, gold medalist(s)	Tamara Bykova	Soviet Union	–	o	o	o	o	o	o	xo	o	xxx	2.01	
2nd place, silver medalist(s)	Ulrike Meyfarth	West Germany	–	o	o	o	o	xo	xo	o	x–	xx	1.99	
3rd place, bronze medalist(s)	Louise Ritter	United States	–	o	o	o	xo	xo	xxx				1.95	
4	Coleen Sommer	United States	–	o	o	o	xo	xxo	xxx				1.95	
5	Kerstin Brandt	East Germany	–	o	xo	xxo	xo	xxx					1.95	
6	Debbie Brill	Canada	–	o	o	o	xxx						1.88	
7	Susanne Helm	East Germany	–	o	o	xo	xxx						1.88	
8	Olga Juha	Hungary	o	o	xo	xo	xxx						1.88	
9	Vanessa Browne	Australia	o	o	xxo	xxo	xxx						1.88	
10	Silvia Costa	Cuba	–	o	o	xxx							1.84	
11	Andrea Bienias	East Germany	–	o	o	xxx							1.84	
12	Maryse Ewanjé-Epée	France	–	xo	o	xxx							1.84	
12	Katalin Sterk	Hungary	o	xo	o	xxx							1.84	
12	Minna Vehmasto	Finland	o	xo	o	xxx							1.84	
15	Christine Soetewey	Belgium	xo	o	xo	xxx							1.84	
16	Yang Wenqin	China	o	xxo	xxo	xxx							1.84	
17	Larisa Kositsyna	Soviet Union	–	o	xxx								1.80	
18	Zheng Dazhen	China	o	xo	xxx								1.80	

== See also ==
- National champions high jump (women)
- 1980 Women's Olympic High Jump (Moscow)
- 1982 Women's European Championships High Jump (Athens)
- 1984 Women's Olympic High Jump (Los Angeles)
- 1984 Women's Friendship Games High Jump (Prague)
- 1986 Women's European Championships High Jump (Stuttgart)
