= 1983 European Athletics Indoor Championships – Women's high jump =

Sports competition

The women's high jump event at the 1983 European Athletics Indoor Championships was held on 6 March.

== Results ==
Rank	Name	Nationality	Result	Notes
1st place, gold medalist(s)	Tamara Bykova	Soviet Union	2.03	WB
2nd place, silver medalist(s)	Larisa Kositsyna	Soviet Union	1.94	
3rd place, bronze medalist(s)	Maryse Éwanjé-Épée	France	1.92	
4	Emese Béla	Hungary	1.90	
5	Sylvie Prenveille	France	1.87	
6	Chris Soetewey	Belgium	1.84	
7	Susanne Lorentzon	Sweden	1.84	
8	Lidija Lapajne	Yugoslavia	1.84	
9	Ella Wijnants	Netherlands	1.80	
10	Brigid Corrigan	Ireland	1.75	
