= Athletics at the 1988 Summer Olympics – Women's high jump =

Women's high jump at the Games of the XXIV Olympiad
- Venue: Olympic Stadium
- Date: September 29 (qualifications); September 30 (final)
- Competitors: 24 from 15 nations
- Winning height: 2.03 OR

Medalists
1st place, gold medalist(s)		Louise Ritter; United States
2nd place, silver medalist(s)		Stefka Kostadinova; Bulgaria
3rd place, bronze medalist(s)		Tamara Bykova; Soviet Union

The Women's High Jump Competition at the 1988 Summer Olympics in Seoul, South Korea had an entry list of 24 competitors, with two qualifying groups (24 jumpers) before the final (12) took place on Friday September 30, 1988.

== Records ==
These were the standing World and Olympic records (in metres) prior to the 1988 Summer Olympics.

World record	2.09	(Bulgaria) Stefka Kostadinova	Rome (ITA)	August 30, 1987
Olympic record	2.02	(West Germany) Ulrike Meyfarth	Los Angeles (USA)	August 10, 1984

The following Olympic record was set during this competition.

Date	Event	Athlete	Height	OR	WR
September 30, 1988	Final	Louise Ritter (USA)	2.03m	OR	

== Results ==
=== Qualifying ===
Rank	Group	Name	Nationality	1.70	1.75	1.80	1.84	1.87	1.90	1.92	Result	Notes
1	A	Kim Hee-sun	South Korea	–	o	o	o	o	o	o	1.92	Q
1	B	Megumi Sato	Japan	–	–	o	o	o	o	o	1.92	Q
1	B	Tamara Bykova	Soviet Union	o	o	o	o	o	o	o	1.92	Q
4	A	Janet Boyle	Great Britain	–	o	o	o	o	xo	o	1.92	Q
4	A	Olga Turchak	Soviet Union	–	–	o	o	o	xo	o	1.92	Q
4	B	Galina Astafei	Romania	–	o	o	xo	o	o	o	1.92	Q
7	A	Maryse Ewanjé-Epée	France	–	o	o	xo	xo	xo	o	1.92	Q
8	A	Stefka Kostadinova	Bulgaria	–	–	o	o	–	o	xo	1.92	Q
8	B	Lyudmila Andonova	Bulgaria	–	–	o	o	o	o	xo	1.92	Q
8	B	Diana Davies	Great Britain	–	–	o	o	o	o	xo	1.92	Q
11	B	Louise Ritter	United States	–	–	–	o	xo	o	xxo	1.92	Q
11	B	Christine Stanton	Australia	–	–	xo	o	o	o	xxo	1.92	Q
13	A	Heike Redetzky	West Germany	–	–	o	–	o	o	xxx	1.90	
14	A	Vanessa Browne	Australia	–	o	o	xo	xxo	xo	xxx	1.90	
15	A	Jin Ling	China	–	o	o	o	o	xxo	xxx	1.90	
16	B	Jo Jennings	Great Britain	–	o	o	xo	xo	xxo	xxx	1.90	
17	B	Liudmyla Avdieienko	Soviet Union	–	–	o	o	o	xxx		1.87	
18	B	Coleen Sommer	United States	–	–	o	o	xo	xxx		1.87	
19	A	Patricia King	United States	–	o	o	o	xxx			1.84	
20	B	Madely Beaugendre	France	–	o	xo	o	xxx			1.84	
21	A	Cristina Fink	Mexico	–	o	o	xxo	xxx			1.84	
22	A	Biljana Petrović	Yugoslavia	o	xo	o	xxx				1.80	
23	B	Su Chun-yueh	Chinese Taipei	o	o	xo	xxx				1.80	
24	A	Lucienne N'Da	Ivory Coast	o	xxo	xxx					1.75	

=== Final ===
Rank	Name	Nationality	1.75	1.80	1.85	1.90	1.93	1.96	1.99	2.01	2.03	2.03	Result	Notes
1st place, gold medalist(s)	Louise Ritter	United States	–	o	o	o	o	o	o	o	xxx	o	2.03	OR
2nd place, silver medalist(s)	Stefka Kostadinova	Bulgaria	–	o	o	o	o	o	o	o	xxx	x	2.01	
3rd place, bronze medalist(s)	Tamara Bykova	Soviet Union	–	o	o	o	o	xo	xxo	xxx			1.99	
4	Olga Turchak	Soviet Union	–	o	o	xo	o	o	xxx				1.96	
5	Galina Astafei	Romania	o	o	o	o	o	xxx					1.93	
5	Lyudmila Andonova	Bulgaria	–	o	o	o	o	xxx					1.93	
7	Christine Stanton	Australia	–	o	o	o	xo	xxx					1.93	
8	Diana Davies	Great Britain	–	o	o	o	xxx						1.90	
8	Kim Hui-seon	South Korea	–	o	o	o	xxx						1.90	
10	Maryse Ewanjé-Epée	France	–	o	o	xo	xxx						1.90	
11	Megumi Sato	Japan	–	o	o	xxo	xxx						1.90	
12	Janet Boyle	Great Britain	–	o	xo	xxo	xxx						1.90	

== See also ==
- National champions high jump (women)
- 1984 Women's Olympic High Jump (Los Angeles)
- 1984 Women's Friendship Games High Jump (Prague)
- 1986 Women's European Championships High Jump (Stuttgart)
- 1987 Women's World Championships High Jump (Rome)
- 1990 Women's European Championships High Jump (Split)
- 1991 Women's World Championships High Jump (Tokyo)
- 1992 Women's Olympic High Jump (Barcelona)
