= Diana Davies (athlete) =

British high jumper

Diana Davies née Elliott
Personal information
- Nationality: British (English)
- Born: 7 May 1961 (age 64) Catworth, Cambridgeshire, England

Sport
- Sport: Athletics
- Event: high jump
- Club: Leicester Coritanian AC

Diana Clare Davies (née Elliott; born 7 May 1961) is a retired female high jumper from Great Britain, Her personal best of 1.95 metres set on 26 June 1982, at a meet in Oslo, Norway, stood as the UK national record until 2014. She competed at two Olympic Games, reaching the final on both occasions. In Los Angeles 1984, she finished in 9th place (1.88 m), while in Seoul 1988, she finished 8th (1.90m).

== Biography ==
As a 17-year-old, Elliott finished second behind Carol Mathers in the high jump event at the 1978 WAAA Championships with a jump of 1.76 metres. Elliott would also be runner-up at the 1980 AAAs Indoors and the 1981 AAAs Outdoors.

Her breakthrough year came in 1982 when she broke the UK records, both indoors and outdoors. Indoors she broke Ann-Marie Cording's record of 1.91 m with a clearance of 1.94 to finish fifth at the European Indoor Championships in Milan. She then set a new outdoor mark of 1.95 m in Oslo, to add one centimetre to Louise Miller's previous record. The indoor record would survive for 15 years. Debbie Marti (1991) and Jo Jennings (1993) both equalled it, before Marti cleared 1.95 in 1997. This remained the record until Katarina Johnson-Thompson cleared 1.96 m in 2014. The outdoor record stood for 32 years. It was equalled by both Susan Jones (2001) and Jessica Ennis (2007), before Isobel Pooley broke it with a clearance of 1.96 m in August 2014. She represented England in the high jump event, at the 1982 Commonwealth Games in Brisbane, Australia.

Elliott finally became the British high jump champion after winning the British WAAA Championships title at the 1984 WAAA Championships. In the same year, she also won the AAAs Indoor and UK Championship. At her first Olympic Games in Los Angeles, she cleared 1.90 in the qualification round, before finishing equal ninth in the final with 1.88.

In 1986, now Diana Davies, she again won all three national titles and finished fourth at two major Championships. At the European Indoor Championships in Madrid she was fourth with 1.90 m. Then representing England at the 1986 Commonwealth Games in Edinburgh, Scotland, in one of the highest quality Commonwealth high jump competitions, she again found 1.90 m not enough for a medal, losing out on countback to the Northern Irish pair, Sharon McPeake and Janet Boyle. The winner was Australia's Christine Stanton with 1.92 m. At the European Championships in Stuttgart, both McPeake and Boyle failed to reach the final, leaving Davies as the only UK finalist, placing eighth with 1.87 m.

In 1987, she finished a fine fifth at the World Indoor Championships in Indianapolis, with 1.91 m.

Davies qualified for her second Olympic Games in 1988. At the games in Seoul, she again reached the final. Having cleared 1.92 m in qualification she cleared 1.90 m for equal eighth. With fellow UK jumper Janet Boyle also reaching the final (12th), 1988 remains the last Olympic high jump final to feature two UK women. Davies is also the last British women to reach two Olympic high jump finals. The only UK finalist since being Debbie Marti in 1992.

Davies won her fourth AAAs Outdoor title in 1989, earning selection for England, at the 1990 Commonwealth Games in Auckland, New Zealand, which were held in January. In Auckland she finished ninth, only managing to clear 1.80 m. This would be her last major international competition.

After several low key years, Davies won her first national medal in six years at the 1995 AAAs National Championships, finishing second to Lea Haggett on countback, both having cleared 1.85 m.

She now works in Woolden Hill primary school in Leicester.

== National titles ==
- 4 Times AAAs National Champion: 1984, 85, 86, 89 (2nd in 1978, 81, 95)
- 2 Times AAAs National Indoor Champion: 1984, 86 (2nd in 1980, 82, 87)
- 4 Times UK National Champion: 1984, 86, 87, 88 (2nd in 1982)

== International competitions ==
Year	Competition	Venue	Position	Notes
Representing Great Britain / England
1982	European Indoor Championships	Milan, Italy	5th	1.94 m
1982	Commonwealth Games	Brisbane, Australia	6th	1.80 m
1984	Olympic Games	Los Angeles, United States	9th	1.88 m (1.90)
1985	World Indoor Games	Paris, France	13th	1.80 m
1985	European Cup	Moscow, Soviet Union	7th	1.85 m
1986	European Indoor Championships	Madrid, Spain	4th	1.90 m
1986	Commonwealth Games	Edinburgh, United Kingdom	4th	1.90 m
1986	European Championships	Stuttgart, Germany	8th	1.87 m (1.89)
1987	European Indoor Championships	Lievin, France	14th	1.85 m
1987	World Indoor Championships	Indianapolis, United States	5th	1.91 m
1988	European Indoor Championships	Budapest, Hungary	13th	1.80 m
1988	Olympic Games	Seoul, South Korea	=8th	1.90 m (1.92)
1990	Commonwealth Games	Auckland, New Zealand	=9th	1.80 m

- Results in brackets is the height achieved in qualifying round.
