= 1987 IAAF World Indoor Championships – Women's high jump =

The women's high jump event at the 1987 IAAF World Indoor Championships was held at the Hoosier Dome in Indianapolis on 8 March. There was no qualification round, only a final round.

== Results ==
Rank	Name	Nationality	1.80	1.85	1.88	1.91	1.94	1.97	2.00	2.02	2.05	2.09	Result	Notes
1st place, gold medalist(s)	Stefka Kostadinova	Bulgaria								o	xo	xxx	2.05	WR, CR
2nd place, silver medalist(s)	Susanne Helm	East Germany								o	r		2.02	NR
3rd place, bronze medalist(s)	Emilia Dragieva	Bulgaria											2.00	
4	Tamara Bykova	Soviet Union											1.94	
5	Diana Davies	Great Britain											1.91	
6	Heike Redetzky	West Germany											1.91	
7	Katrena Johnson	United States											1.91	
8	Olga Turchak	Soviet Union											1.91	
9	Katalin Sterk	Hungary											1.88	
9	Rita Graves	United States											1.88	
11	Megumi Sato	Japan											1.85	
11	Urszula Kielan	Poland											1.85	
13	Elżbieta Trylińska	Poland											1.80	
	Debbie Brill	Canada											DNS	
