= Sigrid Kirchmann =

Austrian high jumper

Personal information
- Born: March 29, 1966 (age 60) Bad Ischl, Austria
- Height: 1.81 m (5 ft 11 in)
- Weight: 64 kg (141 lb)
Medal record
Women's Athletics
Representing Austria
World Championships
Bronze medal – third place	1993 Stuttgart	High jump
European Indoor Championships
Bronze medal – third place	1994 Paris	High jump

Sigrid Kirchmann (born March 29, 1966) is a former high jumper from Austria, best known for winning Austria's first ever medal at the World Championships in Athletics. She did so in 1993, finishing third behind two Cubans. Also competing in the pentathlon, Kirchmann represented her native country in the women's high jump at the 1992 Summer Olympics.

== International competitions ==
Year	Competition	Venue	Position	Notes
Representing Austria
1983	European Junior Championships	Schwechat, Austria	7th	1.85 m
1985	Universiade	Kobe, Japan	11th	1.83 m
1986	European Indoor Championships	Madrid, Spain	11th	1.80 m
1986	European Championships	Stuttgart, West Germany	11th	1.79 m
1987	European Indoor Championships	Liévin, France	16th	1.85 m
1987	World Championships	Rome, Italy	–	NM
1988	European Indoor Championships	Budapest, Hungary	–	NM
1990	European Championships	Split, Yugoslavia	4th	1.89 m
1991	World Championships	Tokyo, Japan	26th (q)	1.75 m
1992	Olympic Games	Barcelona, Spain	5th	1.94 m
1993	Universiade	Buffalo, United States	6th	1.91 m
1993	World Championships	Stuttgart, Germany	3rd	1.97 m
1994	European Indoor Championships	Paris, France	3rd	1.94 m
1994	European Championships	Helsinki, Finland	10th	1.90 m
1995	World Indoor Championships	Barcelona, Spain	8th	1.93 m
1998	European Championships	Budapest, Hungary	4th	1.92 m
2000	European Indoor Championships	Ghent, Belgium	17th (q)	1.80 m
