= 1994 European Athletics Indoor Championships – Women's high jump =

The women's high jump event at the 1994 European Athletics Indoor Championships was held in Palais Omnisports de Paris-Bercy on 11 and 12 March.

== Medalists ==
Gold	Silver	Bronze
Stefka Kostadinova; Bulgaria	Desislava Aleksandrova; Bulgaria	Sigrid Kirchmann; Austria

== Results ==
=== Qualification ===
Qualification performance: 1.89 (Q) or at least 12 best performers (q) advanced to the final.

Rank	Athlete	Nationality	1.75	1.80	1.85	1.87	1.89	Result	Notes
1	Desislava Aleksandrova	Bulgaria	o	o	o	o	o	1.89	Q
1	Tatsiana Sheuchyk	Belarus	–	o	o	o	o	1.89	Q
1	Yelena Rodina	Russia	–	o	o	o	o	1.89	Q
4	Stefka Kostadinova	Bulgaria	–	–	o	xo	o	1.89	Q
4	Hanne Haugland	Norway	–	o	o	xo	o	1.89	Q
4	Iryna Mykhalchenko	Ukraine	o	o	o	xo	o	1.89	Q
7	Zuzana Kováčiková	Czech Republic	o	o	o	xxo	o	1.89	Q
8	Inna Gliznuta	Moldova	o	o	o	o	xo	1.89	Q
8	Marion Hellmann	Germany	–	o	o	o	xo	1.89	Q
8	Sigrid Kirchmann	Austria	–	o	o	o	xo	1.89	Q
11	Britta Bilač	Slovenia	–	o	o	o	xxo	1.89	Q
12	Maryse Maury	France	–	o	o	o	xxo	1.89	Q
13	Niki Bakoyianni	Greece	o	o	o	xo	xxx	1.87	
13	Yelena Topchina	Russia	–	o	o	xo	xxx	1.87	
15	Manuela Aigner	Germany	o	xo	o	xxo	xxx	1.87	
16	Valentīna Gotovska	Latvia	–	o	xo	xxx		1.85	
17	Sabrina De Leeuw	Belgium	o	xo	xo	xxx		1.85	
18	Sieglinde Cadusch	Switzerland	o	o	xxo	xxx		1.85	
18	Emelie Färdigh	Sweden	o	o	xxo	xxx		1.85	
20	Claudia Ellinger-Stiefel	Switzerland	o	xxo	xxx			1.80	
20	Maria Lindholm	Sweden	o	xxo	xxx			1.80	
20	Gülsün Durak	Turkey	o	xxo	xxx			1.80	
	Laura Sharpe	Ireland	xxx					NM	
	Galina Astafei	Romania						DNS	
	Heike Balck	Germany						DNS	

=== Final ===
Rank	Name	Nationality	1.80	1.85	1.90	1.93	1.96	1.98	2.00	Result	Notes
1st place, gold medalist(s)	Stefka Kostadinova	Bulgaria	–	xo	o	o	xo	xo	xxx	1.98	
2nd place, silver medalist(s)	Desislava Aleksandrova	Bulgaria	o	o	o	o	o	xx–	x	1.96	AJR
3rd place, bronze medalist(s)	Sigrid Kirchmann	Austria	–	o	xo	o	o	xxx		1.96	NR
4	Tatsiana Sheuchyk	Belarus	–	o	xxo	o	xo	xxx		1.96	
5	Yelena Rodina	Russia	–	o	o	o	xxx			1.93	
6	Hanne Haugland	Norway	o	o	xo	o	xxx			1.93	
7	Britta Bilač	Slovenia	o	o	o	xxo	xxx			1.93	
8	Inna Gliznuta	Moldova	o	o	o	xxx				1.90	
9	Iryna Mykhalchenko	Ukraine	xo	o	o	xxx				1.90	
10	Marion Hellmann	Germany	o	o	xo	xxx				1.90	
11	Maryse Maury	France	o	o	xxx					1.85	
12	Zuzana Kováčiková	Czech Republic	o	xxx						1.80	
