= Emilia Dragieva =

Bulgarian former track and field athlete

Medal record

Women's athletics

Representing Bulgaria

World Indoor Championships
Bronze medal – third place	1987 Indianapolis	High jump

Emilia Dragieva (Bulgarian: Емилия Драгиева, née Petkanova (Петканова); born 11 January 1965) is a Bulgarian former track and field athlete who specialised in the high jump. Her personal best was 2.00 m (6 ft 6 1/2 in), which she set while winning her sole international medal – a bronze at the 1987 IAAF World Indoor Championships.

== Career ==
Dragieva emerged during a period of very high quality Bulgarian women high jumpers. At the 1986 Bulgarian Athletics Championships she placed third with a mark of 1.85 m (6 ft 3/4 in) behind Stefka Kostadinova and Svetlana Isayeva – at this meet Kostadinova equalled the then-women's high jump world record of 2.07 m (6 ft 9 1/4 in) (matching the feat of yet another Bulgarian Lyudmila Andonova). Dragieva improved her own best to 1.93 m (6 ft 3 3/4 in) in Stara Zagora.

Dragieva made her international debut at a major tournament at the 1987 European Athletics Indoor Championships and she placed seventh with her best jump of 1.88 m (6 ft 2 in). She reached the peak of her career shortly after at the 1987 IAAF World Indoor Championships. She cleared 2.00 m (6 ft 6 1/2 in) in the final to take the bronze medal behind fellow Bulgarian Kostadinova and Germany's Susanne Beyer. This performance ranked her third in the world indoors that year. Her jump was also the best ever indoors by a European under-23 athlete. This record lasted until 2002, when Marina Kuptsova improved it by three centimetres.

Despite the promise shown in the 1987 season, she only major one further appearance for Bulgaria at a high-profile event, coming fifth at the 1988 European Athletics Indoor Championships with a mark of 1.91 m (6 ft 3 in). Her career best of two metres marked her as the best jumper on a height basis – at 1.68 m (5 ft 6 in) tall her personal best was 32 centimetres greater than her height. Greek jumper Niki Bakoyianni improved this differential by a centimetre in 1996, clearing a height 33 centimetres greater than her height.

After retiring from competition she remained involved in the sport and was the venue co-ordinator for the 2015 European Team Championships events that were held in Stara Zagora.

== International competitions ==
Year	Competition	Venue	Position	Event	Notes
1987	European Indoor Championships	Liévin, France	7th	High jump	1.88 m
1987	World Indoor Championships	Indianapolis, United States	3rd	High jump	2.00 m
1988	European Indoor Championships	Budapest, Hungary	5th	High jump	1.91 m
