= Éwanjé-Épée =

Éwanjé-Épée is a French language surname. Notable people with the surname include:

- Maryse Éwanjé-Épée (born 1964), French high jumper
- Monique Éwanjé-Épée (born 1967), French hurdler
