= 1987 IAAF Grand Prix Final =

International track and field competition

- Host city: Brussels, Belgium
- Events: 17
- Dates: 11 September
- Main venue: King Baudouin Stadium

The 1987 IAAF Grand Prix Final was the third edition of the season-ending competition for the IAAF Grand Prix track and field circuit, organised by the International Association of Athletics Federations. It was held on 11 September at the King Baudouin Stadium in Brussels, Belgium. Tonie Campbell (110 metres hurdles) and Merlene Ottey (100 metres) were the overall points winners of the tournament.

== Medal summary ==
=== Men ===
Event	Gold		Silver		Bronze	
200 metres	Carl Lewis (USA)	20.31	Thomas Jefferson (USA)	20.43	James Butler (USA)	20.58
400 metres	Danny Everett (USA)	45.28	Innocent Egbunike (NGR)	45.34	Mike Franks (USA)	45.45
1500 metres	Abdi Bile (SOM)	3:31.80	Jim Spivey (USA)	3:36.87	Markus Hacksteiner (SUI)	3:37.91
5000 metres	Arturo Barrios (MEX)	13:28.34	Sydney Maree (USA)	13:29.73	Paul Williams (CAN)	13:31.75
110 m hurdles	Tonie Campbell (USA)	13.35	Greg Foster (USA)	13.36	Mark McKoy (CAN)	13.42
Pole vault	Sergey Bubka (URS)	5.80 m	Earl Bell (USA)	5.70 m	Thierry Vigneron (FRA)	5.60 m
Long jump	Mike Powell (USA)	8.20 m	Robert Emmiyan (URS)	8.14 m	Larry Myricks (USA)	8.06 m
Discus throw	Alois Hannecker (FRG)	63.84 m	Luis Delís (CUB)	62.02 m	Romas Ubartas (URS)	61.76 m
Javelin throw	Viktor Yevsyukov (URS)	84.02 m	Tom Petranoff (USA)	83.24 m	Jan Železný (TCH)	79.26 m

=== Women ===
Event	Gold		Silver		Bronze	
100 metres	Merlene Ottey (JAM)	11.09	Juliet Cuthbert (JAM)	11.19	Anelia Nuneva (BUL)	11.27
800 metres	Ana Fidelia Quirot (CUB)	1:58.80	Slobodanka Čolović (YUG)	2:00.18	Shireen Bailey (GBR)	2:00.27
One mile	Doina Melinte (ROM)	4:24.05	Elly van Hulst (NED)	4:25.13	Paula Ivan (ROM)	4:27.62
3000 metres	Yelena Romanova (URS)	8:41.15	Maricica Puică (ROM)	8:42.30	Liz Lynch (GBR)	8:42.93
400 m hurdles	Sabine Busch (GDR)	54.28	Debbie Flintoff-King (AUS)	54.56	Sandra Farmer (JAM)	55.30
High jump	Stefka Kostadinova (BUL)	1.99 m	Svetlana Isaeva (BUL)	1.97 m	Tamara Bykova (URS)	1.97 m
Long jump	Jackie Joyner-Kersee (USA)	7.07 m	Galina Chistyakova (URS)	6.92 m	Helga Radtke (GDR)	6.84 m
Shot put	Natalya Lisovskaya (URS)	20.57 m	Heike Hartwig (GDR)	19.93 m	Helena Fibingerová (TCH)	19.68 m

== Points leaders ==
=== Men ===
Event	Gold		Silver		Bronze	
Overall	Tonie Campbell (USA)	63	Greg Foster (USA)	59	Sergey Bubka (URS)	58
200 metres	Thomas Jefferson (USA)	53	Calvin Smith (USA)	52	Robson da Silva (BRA)	43
400 metres	Innocent Egbunike (NGR)	55	Danny Everett (USA)	40	Derek Redmond (GBR)	38
1500 metres	Abdi Bile (SOM)	52	Jim Spivey (USA)	34	Mike Hillardt (AUS)	34
5000 metres	Arturo Barrios (MEX)	46	Sydney Maree (USA)	32	Doug Padilla (USA)	31
110 m hurdles	Tonie Campbell (USA)	63	Greg Foster (USA)	59	Mark McKoy (CAN)	46
Pole vault	Sergey Bubka (URS)	58	Thierry Vigneron (FRA)	55	Earl Bell (USA)	46.5
Long jump	Larry Myricks (USA)	57	Robert Emmiyan (URS)	50	Mike Powell (USA)	41
Discus throw	Romas Ubartas (URS)	50	Imrich Bugár (TCH)	46	Bradley Cooper (BAH)	41
Javelin throw	Tom Petranoff (USA)	51	Mick Hill (GBR)	49	Viktor Yevsyukov (URS)	43

=== Women ===
Event	Gold		Silver		Bronze	
Overall	Merlene Ottey (JAM)	63	Doina Melinte (ROM)	63	Stefka Kostadinova (BUL)	61
100 metres	Merlene Ottey (JAM)	63	Anelia Nuneva (BUL)	55	Angela Bailey (CAN)	41
800 metres	Ana Fidelia Quirot (CUB)	58	Doina Melinte (ROM)	44	Kirsty Wade (GBR)	39
One mile	Elly van Hulst (NED)	36	Paula Ivan (ROM)	28	Doina Melinte (ROM)	27
3000 metres	Maricica Puică (ROM)	39	Mary Knisely (USA)	33	Liz Lynch (GBR)	27
400 m hurdles	Debbie Flintoff-King (AUS)	55	Sandra Farmer (JAM)	50	Judi Brown-King (USA)	37
High jump	Stefka Kostadinova (BUL)	61	Louise Ritter (USA)	53	Svetlana Isaeva (BUL)	44
Long jump	Vali Ionescu (ROM)	45	Lyudmila Ninova (BUL)	42	Jennifer Inniss (USA)	40
Shot put	Helena Fibingerová (TCH)	55	Natalya Lisovskaya (URS)	51	Ramona Pagel (USA)	29
