= Susanne Beyer (high jumper) =

German high jumper

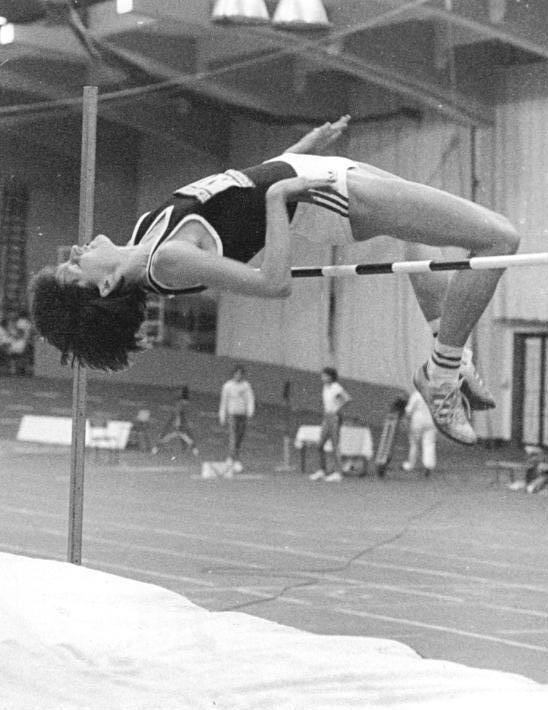

Personal information
- Born: 24 June 1961 (age 65) Suhl, East Germany

Sport
- Sport: Track and field
Medal record
Representing East Germany
World Championships
Bronze medal – third place	1987 Rome	High jump
World Indoor Championships
Silver medal – second place	1987 Indianapolis	High jump
European Indoor Championships
Silver medal – second place	1985 Piraeus	High jump
Bronze medal – third place	1987 Lievin	High jump

Susanne Beyer, (née Helm, born 24 June 1961) is a retired East German high jumper. She won a bronze medal at the 1987 World Championships.

== Biography ==
Born Susanne Helm in Suhl, she finished seventh at the 1983 World Championships and fourth at the 1986 European Championships. She began the 1987 season well with a win at the Hochsprung mit Musik meeting, taking the title with a leap of 2.00 m. She maintained her form indoors and won the silver medal at the 1987 World Indoor Championships with a lifetime best of 2.02 metres. Her season peaked with a bronze medal at the 1987 World Championships, scoring a lifetime outdoor best of 1.99 metres. At the European Indoor Championships she won the silver in 1985 and a bronze in 1987.

She represented the sports team SC Dynamo Berlin and became East German champion in 1983, 1985 and 1987.

Her outdoor personal best jump of 1.99 metres ranks her eighth among German high jumpers, behind Ariane Friedrich (2.06), Heike Henkel (2.05), Ulrike Meyfarth (2.03), Heike Balck (2.01), Alina Astafei (2.01), Rosemarie Ackermann (2.00) and Daniela Rath (2.00) and joint with Kerstin Brandt. Her indoor best of 2.02 m, ranks her fourth on the German all-time indoor list, behind Henkel (2.07), Friedrich (2.05) and Astafei (2.04).

== International competitions ==
Year	Competition	Venue	Position	Notes
Representing East Germany
1983	World Championships	Helsinki, Finland	7th	1.88 m
1984	Friendship Games	Prague, Czechoslovakia	8th	1.85 m
1985	European Indoor Championships	Piraeus, Greece	2nd	1.94 m
1985	World Cup	Canberra, Australia	3rd	1.97 m
1986	Goodwill Games	Moscow, Soviet Union	5th	1.96 m
1986	European Championships	Stuttgart, Germany	4th	1.90 m
1987	European Indoor Championships	Lievin, France	3rd	1.91 m
1987	World Indoor Championships	Indianapolis, United States	2nd	2.02 m
1987	World Championships	Rome, Italy	3rd	1.99 m

== See also ==
- Female two metres club
