= Susanne Lorentzon =

Swedish high jumper

Medal record

Women's athletics

Representing Sweden

IAAF World Indoor Games
Silver medal – second place	1985 Paris	High jump

Barbro Marie Susanne Lorentzon-Borg (born 11 June 1961) is a Swedish former track and field athlete who specialised in the high jump. She held the Swedish record for the high jump from 22 June 1980 to 20 April 1997, when her lifetime best of 1.94 m (6 ft 4 1/4 in) was beaten by Kajsa Bergqvist.

She was born in Västerås to Inga-Britt Lorentzon (a 1960 Olympian for Sweden in the high jump) and Inge Lorentzon, a national men's sprint champion. Susanne followed in her mother's footsteps while her sister, Annika, took up sprinting like her father. She made her international debut at the 1977 European Athletics Junior Championships, coming 13th overall. Still a teenager, she matched the achievements of her mother by winning the Swedish high jump title in 1979 and was then selected to compete for her country at the 1980 Summer Olympics. On her Olympic debut she cleared a height of 1.85 m (6 ft 3/4 in) in qualifying but did not progress to the final.

Lorentzon attended the University of Texas at El Paso where she competed for the UTEP Miners track and field team, finishing runner-up in the high jump at the 1982 AIAW Indoor Track and Field Championships.

Lorentzon was a finalist at the European Athletics Indoor Championships in 1982 and 1983 and placed twelfth at the 1982 European Athletics Championships. She was chosen as Sweden's representative at the inaugural 1983 World Championships in Athletics, but again failed to make a global final. She was dominant nationally, however, winning all indoor and outdoor titles between 1981 and 1986 (bar the 1982 indoor title).

The peak of her career was the 1985 season. She cleared a Swedish record of 1.94 m (6 ft 4 1/4 in) to take the silver at the 1985 IAAF World Indoor Games and matched that mark outdoors. She also placed fourth at the 1985 European Athletics Indoor Championships – her highest finish at that competition. She jumped for Sweden at European level indoors and out in the 1986 season, but did not reach the same heights. Her last individual international medal came at the Nordic Indoor Athletics Championships that year, jumping 1.87 m (6 ft 1 1/2 in) for the gold ahead of Finland's Niina Vihanto.

== International competitions ==
Year	Competition	Venue	Position	Event	Notes
1977	European Junior Championships	Donetsk, Soviet Union	13th	High jump	1.75 m
1980	Olympic Games	Moscow, Soviet Union	15th (q)	High jump	1.85 m
1981	European Indoor Championships	Grenoble, France	7th	High jump	1.85 m
1982	European Championships	Athens, Greece	12th	High jump	1.88 m
1983	European Indoor Championships	Budapest, Hungary	7th	High jump	1.84 m
1983	World Championships	Helsinki, Finland	13th (q)	High jump	1.80 m
1985	World Indoor Games	Paris, France	2nd	High jump	1.94 m NR
1985	European Indoor Championships	Piraeus, Greece	4th	High jump	1.90 m
1986	European Indoor Championships	Madrid, Spain	8th	High jump	1.85 m
1986	Nordic Indoor Championships	Lidingö, Sweden	1st	High jump	1.87 m
1986	European Championships	Stuttgart, West Germany	20th (q)	High jump	1.80 m

== National titles ==
- Swedish Athletics Championships
  - High jump: 1979, 1981, 1982, 1983, 1984, 1985, 1986
- Swedish Indoor Championships
  - High jump: 1981, 1983, 1984, 1985, 1986

Competing as a guest, she was also the 1980 and 1984 winner at the Finnish Indoor Championships, and the 1981 winner at the Norwegian Indoor Championships.

== See also ==
- List of high jump national champions (women)
