= Athletics at the 1984 Summer Olympics – Women's high jump =

Women's high jump at the Games of the XXIII Olympiad
- Venues: Los Angeles Memorial Coliseum
- Dates: 9–10 August
- Competitors: 29 from 17 nations
- Winning height: 2.02 OR

Medalists
1st place, gold medalist(s)		Ulrike Meyfarth; West Germany
2nd place, silver medalist(s)		Sara Simeoni; Italy
3rd place, bronze medalist(s)		Joni Huntley; United States

These are the official results of the Women's High Jump event at the 1984 Summer Olympics in Los Angeles, California. The final was held on Friday August 10, 1984.

== Medalists ==
Gold	Ulrike Meyfarth; West Germany
Silver	Sara Simeoni; Italy
Bronze	Joni Huntley; United States

== Abbreviations ==
- All results shown are in metres

Q	automatic qualification
q	qualification by rank
DNS	did not start
NM	no mark
OR	olympic record
WR	world record
AR	area record
NR	national record
PB	personal best
SB	season best

== Records ==
Standing records prior to the 1984 Summer Olympics
World Record	Lyudmila Andonova (BUL)	2.07 m	July 20, 1984	Berlin, East Germany
Olympic Record	Sara Simeoni (ITA)	1.97 m	July 26, 1980	Moscow, Soviet Union
Broken records during the 1984 Summer Olympics
Olympic Record	Ulrike Meyfarth (FRG)	2.00 m	August 9, 1984	Los Angeles, United States
Olympic Record	Ulrike Meyfarth (FRG)	2.02 m	August 9, 1984	Los Angeles, United States

== Results ==
=== Qualification ===
- Held on Thursday August 9, 1984

Rank	Group	Name	Nationality	1.70	1.75	1.80	1.84	1.87	1.90	Result	Notes
1	A	Maryse Ewanjé-Epée	France	–	–	o	o	o	o	1.90	Q
1	A	Heike Redetzky	West Germany	o	o	o	o	o	o	1.90	Q
1	A	Christine Stanton	Australia	–	–	o	o	o	o	1.90	Q
1	B	Ulrike Meyfarth	West Germany	–	o	o	o	o	o	1.90	Q
1	B	Sara Simeoni	Italy	–	–	o	o	o	o	1.90	Q
6	B	Pam Spencer	United States	–	o	o	o	xo	o	1.90	Q
7	B	Joni Huntley	United States	–	o	xo	xo	o	o	1.90	Q
8	B	Diana Elliott	Great Britain	–	o	o	o	o	xo	1.90	Q
9	A	Debbie Brill	Canada	–	–	o	xo	o	xo	1.90	Q
9	A	Yang Wenqin	China	–	–	o	xo	o	xo	1.90	Q
11	A	Louise Ritter	United States	–	–	o	o	xxo	xo	1.90	Q
11	B	Vanessa Browne	Australia	–	o	o	xo	xo	xo	1.90	Q
13	A	Niculina Vasile	Romania	–	o	o	o	o	xxo	1.90	Q
13	B	Zheng Dazhen	China	–	o	o	o	o	xxo	1.90	Q
15	A	Brigitte Holzapfel	West Germany	o	o	o	o	xo	xxo	1.90	Q
16	A	Lidija Lapajne	Yugoslavia	–	o	o	o	xo	xxx	1.87	
17	B	Hisayo Fukumitsu	Japan	o	o	o	xo	xo	xxx	1.87	
18	A	Megumi Sato	Japan	o	o	o	xo	xxx		1.84	
19	A	Judy Simpson	Great Britain	–	o	o	xxo	xxx		1.84	
20	A	Brigitte Rougeron	France	–	xo	o	xxo	xxx		1.84	
21	B	Ge Ping	China	–	xo	xxo	xxo	xxx		1.84	
22	A	Laura Agront	Puerto Rico	o	o	o	xxx			1.80	
22	B	Chris Soetewey	Belgium	–	o	o	xxx			1.80	
24	A	Disa Gísladóttir	Iceland	–	o	xo	xxx			1.80	
24	B	Liliana Arigoni	Argentina	–	o	xo	xxx			1.80	
26	B	Isabel Mozún	Spain	o	o	xxx				1.75	
27	B	Brigitte Reid	Canada	o	xxx					1.70	
27	B	Constance Senghor	Senegal	o	xxx					1.70	
29	A	Liu Yen-chiu	Chinese Taipei	xo	xxx					1.70	
	B	Marjon Wijnsma	Netherlands							DNS	

=== Final ===
- Held on August 10, 1984

Rank	Name	Nationality	1.75	1.80	1.85	1.88	1.91	1.94	1.97	2.00	2.02	2.07	Result	Notes
1st place, gold medalist(s)	Ulrike Meyfarth	West Germany	–	o	o	o	o	o	xo	o	o	xxx	2.02	OR
2nd place, silver medalist(s)	Sara Simeoni	Italy	–	o	o	–	o	o	xo	o	xxx		2.00	
3rd place, bronze medalist(s)	Joni Huntley	United States	–	o	xo	o	o	xo	xo	xxx			1.97	
4	Maryse Ewanjé-Epée	France	–	o	o	o	o	o	xxx				1.94	
5	Debbie Brill	Canada	–	o	o	o	xxo	o	xxx				1.94	
6	Vanessa Browne	Australia	o	o	xxo	xo	o	xo	xxx				1.94	
7	Zheng Dazhen	China	–	o	o	o	o	xxx					1.91	
8	Louise Ritter	United States	–	o	xo	xo	o	xxx					1.91	
9	Diana Elliott	Great Britain	–	o	o	o	xxx						1.88	
9	Yang Wenqin	China	–	o	o	o	xxx						1.88	
11	Heike Redetzky	West Germany	–	o	o	xxx							1.85	
11	Pam Spencer	United States	–	–	o	–	xxx						1.85	
11	Christine Stanton	Australia	–	o	o	xxx							1.85	
11	Niculina Vasile	Romania	–	o	o	–	xxx						1.85	
11	Brigitte Holzapfel	West Germany	o	o	o	xxx							1.85	

== See also ==
- 1982 Women's European Championships High Jump (Athens)
- 1983 Women's World Championships High Jump (Helsinki)
- 1984 Women's Friendship Games High Jump (Prague)
- 1986 Women's European Championships High Jump (Stuttgart)
- 1987 Women's World Championships High Jump (Rome)
