= Liu Yen-chiu =

Taiwanese high jumper

Personal information
- Full name: 劉燕秋, Pinyin: Liú Yàn-qiū
- Nationality: Taiwanese
- Born: 1 March 1962 (age 64)

Sport
- Sport: Athletics
- Event: High jump

Liu Yen-chiu (born 1 March 1962) is a Taiwanese athlete. She competed in the women's high jump at the 1984 Summer Olympics.
