= Coleen Sommer =

American high jumper (born 1960)

Personal information
- Born: Coleen Rienstra; June 6, 1960 (age 66) Los Angeles, California, U.S.
Medal record
Women's athletics
Representing the United States
Pan American Games
Gold medal – first place	1983 Caracas	High jump
Gold medal – first place	1987 Indianapolis	High jump

Coleen Sommer (born June 6, 1960, in Los Angeles) is a retired high jumper from the United States, who was born as Coleen Rienstra. She represented her native country at the 1988 Summer Olympics in Seoul, South Korea. She set her personal best at 2.00 metres indoors on 1982-02-14 in Ottawa.

Sommer competed for the Arizona State Sun Devils track and field team.

== Achievements ==
Year	Competition	Venue	Position	Notes
1983	Pan American Games	Caracas, Venezuela	1st	1.91 m
1983	World Championships	Helsinki, Finland	4th	1.95 m
1985	World Cup	Canberra, Australia	7th	1.80 m
1987	Pan American Games	Indianapolis, United States	1st	1.96 m
1987	World Championships	Rome, Italy	11th	1.93 m
1988	Olympic Games	Seoul, South Korea	18th (q)	1.87 m

Sporting positions
Preceded by (Canada) Debbie Brill	USA National High Jump Champion; 1980	Succeeded by (United States) Pam Spencer
Preceded by (United States) Louise Ritter	USA National High Jump Champion; 1987	Succeeded by (United States) Jan Wohlschlag
