= Tonie Campbell =

American hurdler (born 1960)

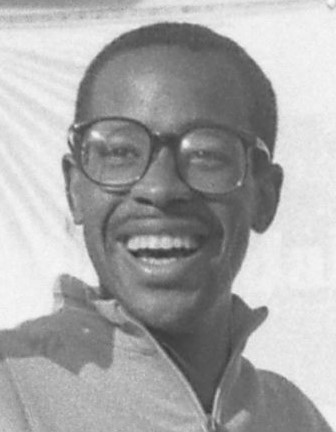
- Campbell in 1984

Personal information
- Born: June 14, 1960 (age 66)
Medal record
Men's athletics
Representing the United States
Olympic Games
Bronze medal – third place	1988 Seoul	110 m Hurdles
World Indoor Championships
Gold medal – first place	1987 Indianapolis	60 m Hurdles

Anthony Eugene Campbell (born June 14, 1960) is an American former hurdler. He is the 1988 Olympic bronze medallist in the 110m Hurdles, the 1987 World Indoor champion in the 60m hurdles, and won the 1985 World Cup title in the 110m hurdles. A three-time winner of the 110 metres hurdles at the IAAF Grand Prix Final, he also won the 1987 Overall Grand Prix title, with fellow hurdler Greg Foster second and pole vaulter Sergey Bubka third.

== Career ==
Born in Los Angeles, California, Campbell attended the University of Southern California. He was the 1982 NCAA Indoor Champion for 60 yard hurdles. While a sophomore at USC, he qualified for the 1980 U.S. Olympic team, but was prevented from competing in the 1980 Summer Olympics by the American-led boycott. Campbell was the youngest member of a movement that considered circumventing the U.S. boycott by competing under the International Olympic Committee flag, in an effort to make a statement that politics and sports should not be mixed. However, threats by U.S. officials to revoke athletes' passports and visas caused the effort to fold. Campbell noted that he would have moved forward with the effort if the group had decided to move forward: "For my age and who I was at the time, that would have been the right thing for me to do. In the event that we were banned from coming back to the U.S., I think I would have survived. I've been around the world enough to see some incredibly wonderful places where I could have been very comfortable."

Campbell won the British AAA Championships title in the 110 metres hurdles event at the 1983 AAA Championships.

Campbell qualified and participated in the 1984 Summer Olympics in Los Angeles, California, taking 5th in the 110m Hurdles; and again in for the 1988 Seoul Games, where he won the bronze medal.

Campbell was one of the most consistent high hurdlers of the 80s. In Track and Field News magazine's world merit rankings, he was ranked in the top ten for eleven consecutive years (1980–90) with his highest placement being number two (in 1987). He married the English hurdler Michelle Edwards. Their daughter Taylor Campbell lives in England and has also competed as a hurdler.

He coached former American footballer David Wilson in the triple jump prior to the 2016 US Olympic Trials.

== International competitions ==
Year	Competition	Venue	Position	Event	Notes
Representing United States
1980	Liberty Bell Classic	Philadelphia, United States	2nd	110 m hurdles	13.68
1984	Olympic Games	Los Angeles, United States	5th	110 m hurdles	13.55
1985	Grand Prix Final	Rome, Italy	1st	110 m hurdles	13.27
1985	World Cup	Canberra, Australia	1st	110 m hurdles	13.35
1987	World Indoor Championships	Indianapolis, United States	1st	60 m hurdles	7.51
1987	Grand Prix Final	Brussels, Belgium	1st	110 m hurdles	13.35
1988	Olympic Games	Seoul, South Korea	3rd	110 m hurdles	13.38
1989	World Indoor Championships	Budapest, Hungary	6th	60 m hurdles	7.86
1989	Grand Prix Final	Monte Carlo, Monaco	1st (tied)	110 m hurdles	13.22
1990	Goodwill Games	Seattle, United States	DISQ	110 m hurdles	—
