= Megumi Sato (athlete) =

Japanese high jumper

Personal information
- Born: 13 September 1966 (age 59) Niigata, Niigata Prefecture, Japan

Sport
- Sport: Track and field
Medal record
Representing Japan
Asian Games
Gold medal – first place	1986 Seoul	High jump
Gold medal – first place	1990 Beijing	High jump
Asian Championships
Bronze medal – third place	1981 Tokyo	High jump
Summer Universiade
Bronze medal – third place	1987 Zagreb	High jump

Megumi Sato (佐藤 恵, Satō Megumi; born 13 September 1966) is a retired Japanese high jumper. Her personal best jump was 1.95 metres, achieved in May 1987 in Fukuoka.

At the Olympic Games she finished eleventh in 1988 and seventh in 1992. She won the bronze medal at the 1987 Summer Universiade and 1990 Goodwill Games. On the regional level she won the 1986 and 1990 Asian Games, the latter in a new championship record of 1.94 metres. In addition she won the bronze medals at the 1981 Asian Championships.

== International competitions ==
Representing Japan
Year	Competition	Venue	Position	Event	Notes
1983	World Championships	Helsinki, Finland	27th (q)	high jump	1.80 m
1984	Olympic Games	Los Angeles, United States	18th (q)	high jump	1.84 m
1986	Asian Games	Seoul, South Korea	1st	high jump	1.89 m
1987	World Indoor Championships	Indianapolis, United States	11th	high jump	1.85 m
1987	Universiade	Zagreb, Yugoslavia	3rd	high jump	1.88 m
1987	World Championships	Rome, Italy	16th (q)	high jump	1.88 m
1988	Olympic Games	Seoul, South Korea	11th	high jump	1.90 m
1989	World Indoor Championships	Budapest, Hungary	13th	high jump	1.85 m
1990	Goodwill Games	Seattle, United States	3rd	high jump	1.89 m
1990	Asian Games	Beijing, China	1st	high jump	1.94 m
1991	World Indoor Championships	Seville, Spain	16th (q)	high jump	1.84 m
1991	World Championships	Tokyo, Japan	19th (q)	high jump	1.83 m
1992	Olympic Games	Barcelona, Spain	7th	high jump	1.91 m
1992	World Cup	Havana, Cuba	6th	high jump	1.75 m
1993	World Championships	Stuttgart, Germany	34th (q)	high jump	1.75 m

Notes:

- Results with a (q) indicate overall position in qualifying round.
