= Olga Juha =

Hungarian high jumper

Olga Juha (born 22 March 1962) is a retired Hungarian high jumper. Her personal best jump was 1.97 metres, achieved in August 1983 in London. She became Hungarian champion in 1984 and 1987.

== Achievements ==
Year	Competition	Venue	Position	Event	Notes
Representing Hungary
1983	World Championships	Helsinki, Finland	8th	High jump	
1986	European Championships	Stuttgart, West Germany	9th	High jump	
