= Elżbieta Trylińska =

Polish high jumper

Elżbieta Krawczuk-Trylińska
Personal information
- Born: 5 October 1960 Białystok, Poland
- Died: 13 December 2017 (aged 57) France
- Education: Warsaw School of Economics
- Height: 1.77 m (5 ft 10 in)
- Weight: 57 kg (126 lb)

Sport
- Sport: Athletics
- Event: High jump
- Club: MKS-AZS Białystok; Juvenia Białystok; AZS-AWF Warszawa
- Coached by: Weronika Mormol; Leszek Szmuchrowski; Jerzy Fidusiewicz
Medal record
Women's athletics
Representing Poland
European Indoor Championships
Silver medal – second place	1981 Grenoble	High jump
Bronze medal – third place	1987 Lievin	High jump

Elżbieta Anna Krawczuk-Trylińska (5 October 1960 – 13 December 2017) was a Polish athlete who specialised in the high jump. She won silver and bronze medals at the 1981 European Indoor Championships and 1987 European Indoor Championships respectively. She also represented her country at the 1980 Summer Olympics, narrowly missing the final.

Her personal best was 1.94 metres both indoors (Grenoble 1981) and outdoors (Warsaw 1986).

== International competitions ==
Year	Competition	Venue	Position	Notes
Representing Poland
1977	European Indoor Championships	San Sebastián, Spain	13th	1.75 m
1979	European Indoor Championships	Vienna, Austria	7th	1.80 m
1979	Universiade	Mexico City, Mexico	5th	1.90 m
1980	European Indoor Championships	Sindelfingen, West Germany	8th	1.84 m
1980	Olympic Games	Moscow, Soviet Union	13th (q)	1.85 m
1981	European Indoor Championships	Grenoble, France	2nd	1.94 m
1981	Universiade	Bucharest, Romania	10th	1.88 m
1986	European Championships	Stuttgart, West Germany	2nd (q)	1.89 m^{1}
1987	European Indoor Championships	Liévin, France	3rd	1.91 m
1987	World Indoor Championships	Indianapolis, United States	13th	1.80 m

^{1}No mark in the final
