= Krisztina Solti =

Hungarian high jumper

Krisztina Solti (born 28 April 1968) is a retired Hungarian high jumper.

She finished sixteenth at the 1989 World Indoor Championships. She also competed at the 1993 World Championships without reaching the final. She became Hungarian champion in 1993.

Her personal best jump was 1.92 metres, achieved in August 1993 in Budapest.
