= Louise Ritter =

American high jumper (born 1958)

Personal information
- Full name: Dorothy Louise Ritter
- Born: February 18, 1958 (age 68) Dallas, Texas, U.S.
- Height: 5 ft 10 in (178 cm)

Sport
- Country: United States
- Sport: Athletics
- Event: High jump
Medal record
Women's athletics
Representing the United States
Olympic Games
Gold medal – first place	1988 Seoul	High jump
World Championships
Bronze medal – third place	1983 Helsinki	High jump
Pan American Games
Gold medal – first place	1979 San Juan	High jump

Dorothy Louise Ritter (born February 18, 1958) is an American former track and field athlete who won the gold medal in the high jump at the 1988 Olympic Games.

== Biography ==
Ritter qualified for the 1980 U.S. Olympic team but was unable to compete due to the 1980 Summer Olympics boycott. She did, however, receive one of 461 Congressional Gold Medals created especially for the spurned athletes.

Ritter won the gold medal in the women's high jump at the 1988 Summer Olympics held in Seoul, South Korea. In doing so she upset Stefka Kostadinova, the reigning world champion and world record-holder in the event.

A graduate from Red Oak High School, she now has a street named after her in her former home town of Red Oak, Texas.

She graduated from Texas Woman's University in 1988 where she starred for U.S. Olympic coach Dr. Bert Lyle.

Ritter was inducted into the Texas Track and Field Coaches Hall of Fame, Class of 2012, and the USTFCCCA Collegiate Athlete Hall of Fame in 2024.

== Achievements ==
- 4 Times US National Champion (1978, 1983, 1985, 1986)
- 3 Times won US Olympic Trials (1980, 1984, 1988)

Note: During the 1980s, the US Championships and US Olympic trials were separate events.

Year	Competition	Venue	Position	Notes
Representing United States
1977	World Cup	Düsseldorf, Germany	4th	1.83 m
1979	Pan American Games	San Juan, Puerto Rico	1st	1.93 m
1979	World Cup	Montreal, Canada	5th	1.87 m
1983	World Championships	Helsinki, Finland	3rd	1.95 m
1984	Olympic Games	Los Angeles, United States	8th	1.91 m
1986	Goodwill Games	Moscow, Soviet Union	8th	1.89 m
1987	World Championships	Rome, Italy	8th	1.93 m
1988	Olympic Games	Seoul, South Korea	1st	2.03 m

Sporting positions
Preceded by (United States) Joni Huntley	USA National High Jump Champion; 1978	Succeeded by (Canada) Debbie Brill
Preceded by (Canada) Debbie Brill	USA National High Jump Champion; 1983	Succeeded by (United States) Pam Spencer
Preceded by (United States) Pam Spencer	USA National High Jump Champion; 1985 — 1986	Succeeded by (United States) Coleen Sommer
