= Olga Turchak =

Kazakhstani high jumper

Personal information
- Born: 5 March 1967 (age 59) Almaty, Soviet Union

Sport
- Sport: Track and field
Medal record
Representing Soviet Union
European Championships
Bronze medal – third place	1986 Stuttgart	High jump
European Junior Championships
Silver medal – second place	1985 Cottbuss	High jump

Olga Turchak (Russian: Опъга Турчак; born 5 March 1967) is a retired female high jumper born in Almaty, Kazakhstan.

== Biography ==
Turchak set her personal best on 7 July 1986, jumping 2.01 metres at a meet in Moscow, a mark that stood as the World Junior Record for 33 years, until being broken twice in a row by Yaroslava Mahuchikh in the 2019 World Championships.

She competed at two Olympic Games, reaching the final on both occasions. In Seoul 1988, she finished in fourth place with 1.96 m, while in Barcelona 1992, she finished thirteenth with 1.83m, having cleared 1.92 m in the qualifying round. Turchak set the Youth World Best Performance on 7 September 1984 in Donetsk, with a jump of 1.96 metres.

== International competitions ==
- All results regarding high jump

Year	Competition	Venue	Position	Notes
Representing Soviet Union / Unified Team
1985	World Indoor Games	Paris, France	9th	1.85 m
1985	European Junior Championships	Cottbus, East Germany	2nd	1.91 m
1986	European Championships	Stuttgart, West Germany	3rd	1.93 m
1987	World Indoor Championships	Indianapolis, United States	8th	1.91 m
1988	Olympic Games	Seoul, South Korea	4th	1.96 m
1989	World Indoor Championships	Budapest, Hungary	8th	1.91 m
1990	European Championships	Split, Yugoslavia	10th	1.85 m (1.88)
1992	Olympic Games	Barcelona, Spain	13th	1.83 m (1.92)

== See also ==
- List of world youth bests in athletics
- List of world junior records in athletics
