= Kim Hee-sun (athlete) =

South Korean high jumper

Personal information
- Nationality: South Korean
- Born: 20 April 1963 (age 63) Daegu, South Korea

Sport
- Sport: Athletics
- Event: High jump
Medal record
Women's athletics
Representing South Korea
Asian Games
Silver medal – second place	1990 Beijing	High jump
Bronze medal – third place	1986 Seoul	High jump
Asian Championships
Silver medal – second place	1987 Singapore	High jump
Silver medal – second place	1989 New Delhi	High jump
Bronze medal – third place	1983 Kuwait City	High jump

Kim Hee-sun (born 20 April 1963) is a South Korean athlete. She competed in the women's high jump at the 1988 Summer Olympics.
