= Liudmyla Avdieienko =

Belarusian high jumper (born 1963)

Personal information
- Nationality: Belarusian
- Born: 14 November 1963 (age 62) Salihorsk, Soviet Union

Sport
- Sport: Athletics
- Event: High jump
Medal record
Representing Soviet Union
Summer Universiade
Silver medal – second place	1985 Kobe	High jump

Liudmyla Stepanivna Avdieienko (née Petrus, born 14 November 1963) is a Belarusian athlete. She competed in the women's high jump at the 1988 Summer Olympics, representing the Soviet Union.
