= Susanne Beyer =

Susanne Beyer may refer to:

- Susanne Beyer (high jumper)
- Susanne Beyer (journalist)
