= Gabriele Günz =

East German high jumper

Gabriele Günz, née Niebling (born 8 September 1961 in Eisenach) is a retired East German high jumper.

== Biography ==
She won the silver medal at the 1986 European Indoor Championships. and finished sixth at the 1988 European Indoor Championships. She represented the sports club SC DHfK Leipzig, and became East German champion in 1988.

Her personal best jump was 1.97 metres, achieved in June 1987 in Halle. She had 2.01 metres on the indoor track, from January 1988 in Stuttgart.

== See also ==
- Female two metres club
