= Athletics at the Friendship Games – Women's high jump =

The women's high jump event at the Friendship Games was held on 17 August 1984 at the Evžen Rošický Stadium in Prague, Czechoslovakia.

== Results ==
Rank	Name	Nationality	Result	Notes
1st place, gold medalist(s)	Lyudmila Andonova	Bulgaria	1.96	
2nd place, silver medalist(s)	Lyudmila Butuzova	Soviet Union	1.96	
3rd place, bronze medalist(s)	Tamara Bykova	Soviet Union	1.96	
4	Stefka Kostadinova	Bulgaria	1.93	
5	Jolanta Komsa	Poland	1.93	
6	Danuta Bułkowska	Poland	1.90	
7	Andrea Bienias	East Germany	1.90	
8	Susanne Helm	East Germany	1.85	
?	Silvia Costa	Cuba	?.??	

== See also ==
- Athletics at the 1984 Summer Olympics – Women's high jump
