= Lyudmila Andonova =

Bulgarian high jumper

Personal information
- Born: 6 May 1960 (age 66) Novocherkassk, Soviet Union

Sport
- Sport: Track and field
Medal record
Representing Bulgaria
Summer Universiade
| Silver medal – second place | 1981 Bucharest | High jump |

Lyudmila Grudeva Andonova (Bulgarian: Людмила Андонова, née Zhecheva; born 6 May 1960) is a retired high jumper from Bulgaria. In 1984, she broke the World Record with a clearance of 2.07 metres. She competed at the 1988 Olympic Games in Seoul and the 1992 Olympic Games in Barcelona. She was named the Bulgarian Sportsperson of the Year in 1984. She was also named the BTA Best Balkan Athlete of the Year in 1984.

== Biography ==
She set the women's world record in the high jump event on July 20, 1984 in East Berlin, jumping 2.07 metres.

In 1985 she was suspended for doping with amphetamine.

Andonova competed at the 1988 Summer Olympics in Seoul, South Korea, finishing in fifth place (1.93 m) alongside Romania's Galina Astafei. She was born in Novocherkassk, Soviet Union, and married to Bulgarian decathlete Atanas Andonov.

== International competitions ==
- All results regarding high jump

| Year | Competition | Venue | Position | Notes |
Representing Bulgaria
| 1981 | Balkan Games | Sarajevo, Yugoslavia | 1st | 1.95 m |
| 1981 | Summer Universiade | Bucharest, Romania | 2nd | 1.94 m |
| 1982 | European Indoor Championships | Milan, Italy | 12th | 1.85 m |
| 1982 | European Championships | Athens, Greece | 6th | 1.91 m |
| 1984 | Balkan Games | Athens, Greece | 1st | 1.97 m |
| 1984 | Friendship Games | Prague, Czechoslovakia | 1st | 1.96 m |
| 1987 | World Championships | Rome, Italy | 12th | 1.85 m (1.91) |
| 1988 | Olympic Games | Seoul, South Korea | 5th | 1.93 m |
| 1992 | European Indoor Championships | Genoa, Italy | 15th | 1.85 m |
| 1992 | Olympic Games | Barcelona, Spain | 25th (q) | 1.88 m |
Result in parentheses indicates height achieved in qualifying round.

== See also ==
- Female two metres club

Records
| Preceded by (Soviet Union) Tamara Bykova | Women's High Jump World Record Holder; July 20, 1984 — June 1, 1986 | Succeeded by (Bulgaria) Stefka Kostadinova |
Sporting positions
| Preceded by (Soviet Union) Tamara Bykova | Women's High Jump Best Year Performance; 1984 | Succeeded by (Bulgaria) Stefka Kostadinova |
| Preceded by (Bulgaria) Yordanka Blagoeva | Women's Bulgarian National Champion; 1981 — 1982 | Succeeded by (Bulgaria) Silvia Koeva |
| Preceded by (Bulgaria) Silvia Koeva | Women's Bulgarian National Champion; 1984 | Succeeded by (Bulgaria) Stefka Kostadinova |
| Preceded by (Bulgaria) Stefka Kostadinova | Women's Bulgarian National Champion; 1992 | Succeeded by (Bulgaria) Eleonora Milusheva |
