= Larisa Kositsyna =

Soviet high jumper

Larisa Kositsyna (born 14 December 1963) is a retired Soviet high jumper. She both competed in the 1983 and in the 1987 World Championships in Athletics - Women's high jump.

Her personal best jump was 2.00 metres, achieved in July 1988 in Chelyabinsk.

== Achievements ==
Year	Competition	Venue	Position	Notes
1981	European Junior Championships	Utrecht, Netherlands	3rd	
1983	European Indoor Championships	Budapest, Hungary	2nd	
1983	World Championships	Helsinki, Finland	17th	
1986	European Indoor Championships	Madrid, Spain	3rd	
1986	European Championships	Stuttgart, West Germany	10th	
1987	World Championships	Rome, Italy	5th	
1988	European Indoor Championships	Budapest, Hungary	3rd	
