= Katalin Sterk =

Hungarian high jumper

Katalin Sterk (born 30 September 1961 in Tatabánya) is a retired Hungarian high jumper. Her personal best jump was 1.98 metres, achieved in August 1986 in Budapest. She became Hungarian champion in 1980, 1982, 1986 and 1988.

== Achievements ==
Year	Competition	Venue	Position	Event	Notes
Representing Hungary
1982	European Indoor Championships	Milan, Italy	3rd	High jump	
1982	European Championships	Athens, Greece	8th	High jump	
1983	World Championships	Helsinki, Finland	12th	High jump	
1987	World Indoor Championships	Indianapolis, United States	9th	High jump	
1987	European Indoor Championships	Liévin, France	7th	High jump	
1988	European Indoor Championships	Budapest, Hungary	13th	High jump	
