= Maryse Éwanjé-Épée =

French high jumper (born 1964)

Maryse Éwanjé-Epée
Personal information
- Nationality: French
- Born: September 4, 1964 (age 61) Poitiers, France
- Height: 1.81 m (5 ft 11 in)

Sport
- Country: France
- Sport: Athletics
- Event: High jump
Medal record
European Indoor Championships
Silver medal – second place	1984 Gothenburg	High jump
Bronze medal – third place	1983 Budapest	High jump
Bronze medal – third place	1989 The Hague	High jump
Summer Universiade
Bronze medal – third place	1983 Edmonton	High jump
Jeux de la Francophonie
Gold medal – first place	1989 Rabat	High jump
Mediterranean Games
Gold medal – first place	1983 Casablanca	High jump

Maryse Éwanjé-Épée (born September 4, 1964, in Poitiers, France) is a retired high jumper from France.

She represented France in the high jump at the 1984 and 1988 Summer Olympics. She set a French national outdoor record of 1.96 m in 1985. Ewanje-Épée also held the NCAA high jump record from 1985 to 1996 with 1.96 m.

== Athletics career ==
Maryse Éwanjé-Épée set her outdoor personal best on July 21, 1985, jumping 1.96 metres at the French National Athletics Championships in Colombes, France. That was a French national outdoor record that remained unmatched for the next 22 years. Melanie Melfort equalled it by jumping 1.96 metres on August 11, 2007. Éwanjé-Épée's indoor personal best was 1.95 metres, set in 1984.

Éwanjé-Épée won three high jump medals (one silver and two bronzes) at the European Indoor Championships, one high jump bronze medal at the Summer Universiade and one high jump gold medal each at the Jeux de la Francophonie and the Mediterranean Games. She competed for France in the high jump in two consecutive Summer Olympics in 1984 and 1988. She finished 4th and 10th in the Olympic high jump final of 1984 and 1988 respectively. She could not take part in the 1992 and 1996 Summer Olympics because of her failure to clear the minimum Olympic qualifying height by a mere centimetre for both of these Olympics. She won eight indoor high jump and eight outdoor high jump French National Athletics Championships titles at the senior level from 1982 to 1996.

Éwanjé-Épée also attended the University of Arizona, in Tucson (United States) and she still holds the heptathlon record since that time. She held the NCAA high jump record from 1985 to 1996 with 1.96 meters. In 1985, Arizona went 1–2–3 in the NCAA Championships with Katrena Johnson in first place, Maryse Éwanjé-Épée in second, and Camille Harding in third.

== Later career ==
After her retirement from high jumping competition in 1996, Ewanjé-Épée transitioned into media and sports activities. In the early 2000s, she began working as a radio anchor, consultant and sport journalist for a famous French radio, RMC. She slowly became a regular contributor and joined the Super Moscato Show in 2008 where she was known for her oustpoken personality and strong opinions on sports. She remained a major figure of RMC for almost two decades before leaving in 2023.

In parallel to her radio career, she developed media and production projects through her company Ya Foye which is known for its produced sports content in the mid-2000s.

After quitting RMC, Ewanjé-épée joined France TV, where she is currently contributing to athletic coverage on television, particularly track and field.

Maryse Ewanjé-épée is also the author of three books related to sports: Négriers du foot, an investigation on the Edel affair, looking into the exploitation of young Africans in soccer; Révolte ! Les rebelles du sport, which explores female athletes who have challenged sport norms and rules; and Jesse, la fabuleuse histoire de Jesse Owens (2016), a biography of the American Olympic champion Jesse Owens.

Alongside of her media and writing career, she is still involved in athletics by being a track and field coach and the president of the Groupe Athlétique de Noisy-le-Grand (G.A.N.G.), a French track and field club.

== Personal life ==
Éwanjé-Épée's father, Charles Éwanjé-Épée, is a Camerounian guitarist-singer-songwriter. Her mother, Geneviève Pujol, had a Spanish Catalan grandfather. Maryse Éwanjé-Épée has three sisters and no brothers; her younger sister, Monique Éwanjé-Épée, competed for France in the 60m hurdles and 100m hurdles.

Maryse Éwanjé-Épée married Marc Maury in 1988. They have three daughters (Mélissa, Tanya, Maïa) and one son (Mikka). She and Marc Maury divorced in 2007.

Éwanjé-Épée speaks French, English and Spanish fluently.

== Results in international competitions ==
- Note: Only the position and height in the final are indicated, unless otherwise stated. (q) means the athlete did not qualify for the final, with the overall position and height in the qualification round indicated.

Year	Competition	Venue	Position	Notes
1982	European Indoor Championships	Milan, Italy	10th	1.88 m
1983	European Indoor Championships	Budapest, Hungary	3rd	1.92 m
1983	Universiade	Edmonton, Canada	3rd	1.92 m
1983	World Championships	Helsinki, Finland	12th	1.84 m
1983	Mediterranean Games	Casablanca, Morocco	1st	1.89 m
1984	European Indoor Championships	Gothenburg, Sweden	2nd	1.95 m
1984	Olympic Games	Los Angeles, United States	4th	1.94 m
1985	European Indoor Championships	Piraeus, Greece	8th	1.80 m
1986	European Indoor Championships	Madrid, Spain	5th	1.90 m
1988	Olympic Games	Seoul, South Korea	10th	1.90 m
1989	European Indoor Championships	The Hague, Netherlands	3rd	1.91 m
1989	World Indoor Championships	Budapest, Hungary	13th	1.85m
1989	Jeux de la Francophonie	Rabat, Morocco	1st	1.88 m
1989	Universiade	Duisburg, West Germany	7th	1.80 m
1990	European Indoor Championships	Glasgow, Scotland	10th	1.84 m
1990	European Championships	Split, Yugoslavia	18th (q)	1.75 m

Records
Preceded by Brigitte Rougeron	Women's French National Champion; 1982–1985	Succeeded by Brigitte Rougeron
Preceded by Madely Beaugendre	Women's French National Champion; 1988	Succeeded by Madely Beaugendre
Preceded by Sandrine Fricot	Women's French National Champion; 1993	Succeeded by Sandrine Fricot
Preceded by Sandrine Fricot	Women's French National Champion; 1995–1996	Succeeded by Marie Collonvillé
