= Lidija Benedetič-Lapajne =

Slovene athlete

Personal information
- Nationality: Slovenian
- Born: 1 April 1959 (age 66) Jesenice, Yugoslavia

Sport
- Sport: Athletics
- Event: High jump

Lidija Benedetič-Lapajne (born 1 April 1959) is a Slovenian retired athlete. She competed in the women's high jump at the 1980 Summer Olympics and the 1984 Summer Olympics, representing Yugoslavia. She set six Yugoslav national records over the course of her career.

Personal bests:

- High Jump (outdoor): 1.92 m, Worrstadt, Germany, 6 June 1985
- High Jump (indoor): 1.88 m, Vienna, Austria, 31 Jan 1985

== Achievements ==
Year	Competition	Venue	Position	Notes
Representing Yugoslavia
1977	European Junior Championships	Donetsk, Ukraine	8	1.78 m
1978	European Indoor Championships	Milan, Italy	13	1.80 m
1979	European Indoor Championships	Vienna, Austria	8	1.80 m
1980	Olympic Games	Moscow, Russia	Q2 9	1.80 m
1981	European Indoor Championships	Grenoble, France	13	1.75 m
1982	European Athletics Championships	Athens, Greece	Q1 8	1.85 m
1983	European Indoor Championships	Budapest, Hungary	8	1.84 m
1983	Balkan Athletics Championships	Izmir, Turkey	1	1.90 m
1983	Mediterranean Games	Casablanca, Morocco	3	1.86 m
1983	World Athletics Championships	Helsinki, Finland	Q2 14	1.80 m
