= Tamara Bykova =

Russian track and field athlete (born 1958)

Personal information
- Native name: Тамара Владимировна Быкова
- Full name: Tamara Vladimirovna Bykova
- Nationality: Russian
- Born: December 21, 1958 (age 67) Azov, Rostov Oblast, Russian SFSR, Soviet Union
- Height: 180 cm (5 ft 11 in)
- Weight: 59 kg (130 lb)

Sport
- Country: Soviet Union (1980–1991)
- Sport: Athletics
- Event: High jump

Achievements and titles
- Personal best: 2.05 m (1984)
Medal record
Women's athletics
Representing the Soviet Union
Olympic Games
Bronze medal – third place	1988 Seoul	High jump
World Championships
Gold medal – first place	1983 Helsinki	High Jump
Silver medal – second place	1987 Rome	High Jump
World Indoor Championships
Silver medal – second place	1989 Budapest	High jump
Silver medal – second place	1991 Seville	High jump
European Championships
Silver medal – second place	1982 Athens	High jump
European Indoor Championships
Gold medal – first place	1983 Budapest	High jump
Silver medal – second place	1987 Liévin	High jump
Universiade
Gold medal – first place	1983 Edmonton	High Jump
Bronze medal – third place	1981 Bucharest	High Jump

Tamara Vladimirovna Bykova (Russian: Тамара Владимировна Быкова; born December 21, 1958) is a Russian former track and field athlete who represented the Soviet Union and competed in the high jump. She is the 1983 World Champion, the 1987 World Championship silver medallist, the 1988 Olympic bronze medallist, and is a former world record holder, with clearances of 2.03 and 2.04 metres in 1983 and 2.05 metres in 1984. She also won silver medals at the 1982 European Championships, the 1989 and 1991 World Indoor Championships, and three times at the World Cup (1981, 1985 and 1989).

== Career ==
Bykova was born in Azov, Rostov, Russia and first came to international attention at the 1980 Olympic Games in Moscow, where she finished ninth in the final with 1.88 meters. Six weeks later she won the Soviet championship with a jump 1.97 meters. At the 1981 World Cup in Rome, she cleared 1.96 m to finish second to West Germany's Ulrike Meyfarth, who set a new world record with a jump of 2.02 meters. At the 1982 European championship in Athens, Bykova cleared 1.97 m to again finish second to Meyfarth. Then at the 1983 European Indoor Championship in Budapest, she cleared 2.03 meters to win the gold medal and set a new world indoor record.

At the 1983 World Championships in Helsinki, Bykova and Meyfarth were the only to jumpers to clear 1.99 meters, but only Bykova could manage the next height of 2.01 meters, to become the inaugural world champion. The next meeting between the two came one month later at the European Cup in Crystal Palace in London. This time Meyfarth set a new world record by jumping over 2.03 meters, but only a few minutes later the Russian jumped over the same height to equal the world record, however she had needed one more attempt than the German and had to settle yet again for second place. Only four days later the two met again, this time in Pisa. This time though, Bykova came out on top with a new world record of 2.04 meters.

In June 1984, Bykova once again broke the world record with a clearance of 2.05 metres. This height would remain her lifetime best. The record would stand for only a month, as Bulgaria's Lyudmila Andonova cleared 2.07 metres in July. Bykova was prevented from competing at the 1984 Olympic Games in Los Angeles due to the Soviet boycott.

In 1987, Bykova won a silver medal at the World Championships in Rome, with a clearance of 2.04 metres. The winner was Stefka Kostadinova of Bulgaria, with a new world record of 2.09 metres. At the 1988 Olympic Games in Seoul, Bykova won the bronze medal with 1.99 metres, behind the American gold medal winner Louise Ritter and the silver medallist Kostadinova.

Bykova received a three-month ban when she tested positive for the drug ephedrine at the Goodwill Games in 1990, and missed the European Championships held later that year.

== International competitions ==
Year	Competition	Venue	Position	Notes
Representing Soviet Union
1980	Olympic Games	Moscow, Soviet Union	9th	1.88 m
1981	Universiade	Bucharest, Romania	3rd	1.94 m
1981	World Cup	Rome, Italy	2nd	1.96 m
1982	European Indoor Championships	Milan, Italy	6th	1.91 m
1982	European Championships	Athens, Greece	2nd	1.97 m
1983	European Indoor Championships	Budapest, Hungary	1st	2.03 m
1983	Universiade	Edmonton, Canada	1st	1.98 m
1983	World Championships	Helsinki, Finland	1st	2.01 m
1984	Friendship Games	Prague, Czechoslovakia	3rd	1.96 m
1985	Grand Prix Final	Rome, Italy	3rd	1.89 m
1985	World Cup	Canberra, Australia	2nd	1.97 m
1986	Goodwill Games	Moscow, Soviet Union	4th	1.96 m
1986	European Championships	Stuttgart, Germany	16th (q)	1.86 m
1987	European Indoor Championships	Liévin, France	2nd	1.94 m
1987	World Indoor Championships	Indianapolis, United States	4th	1.94 m
1987	World Championships	Rome, Italy	2nd	2.04 m
1987	Grand Prix Final	Brussels, Belgium	3rd	1.97 m
1988	Olympic Games	Seoul, South Korea	3rd	1.99 m
1989	World Indoor Championships	Budapest, Hungary	2nd	2.02 m
1989	World Cup	Barcelona, Spain	2nd	1.97 m
1990	Goodwill Games	Seattle, United States	DQ (2nd)	~~1.92 m~~
1991	World Indoor Championships	Seville, Spain	2nd	1.97 m
1991	World Championships	Tokyo, Japan	7th	1.93 m

== See also ==
- List of sportspeople sanctioned for doping offences

Records
Preceded by (West Germany) Ulrike Meyfarth	Women's High Jump World Record Holder; August 25, 1983 – July 20, 1984	Succeeded by (Bulgaria) Lyudmila Andonova
Sporting positions
Preceded by (West Germany) Ulrike Meyfarth	Women's High Jump Best Year Performance; 1983	Succeeded by (Bulgaria) Lyudmila Andonova
