= Christine Stanton =

Australian high jumper

Christine Frances "Chris" Stanton (née Annison, born 12 December 1959) is a retired high jumper from Australia. She set her personal best on 26 January 1985, jumping 1.96 metres at a meet in Adelaide, South Australia. An eight-time national champion in the women's high jump, she competed for her native country at three consecutive Olympic Games, in Moscow 1980, Los Angeles 1984 and Seoul 1988.

She was born in Perth, Western Australia.

== National titles ==
- 8 times Australian high jump champion: 1976–77, 1980–81, 1983, 1985–87

== International competitions ==
Year	Competition	Venue	Position	Notes
Representing Australia
1977	Pacific Conference Games	Canberra, Australia	3rd	1.80 m
1977	World Cup	Düsseldorf, West Germany	6th	1.75 m
1980	Olympic Games	Moscow, Soviet Union	6th	1.91 m
1981	Pacific Conference Games	Christchurch, New Zealand	3rd	1.83 m
1981	World Cup	Rome, Italy	4th	1.86 m
1982	Commonwealth Games	Brisbane, Australia	2nd	1.88 m
1983	World Championships	Helsinki, Finland	29th (q)	1.80 m
1984	Olympic Games	Los Angeles, United States	11th	1.85 m (1.90 m)
1985	World Cup	Canberra, Australia	5th	1.88 m
1986	Commonwealth Games	Edinburgh, Scotland	1st	1.92 m
1987	World Championships	Rome, Italy	17th (q)	1.88 m
1988	Olympic Games	Seoul, South Korea	7th	1.93 m

Notes:

- Results with a q, indicate overall position in qualifying round.
- Results in brackets, indicate superior height achieved in qualifying round.
