= 1986 European Athletics Indoor Championships =

- Dates: 22–23 February 1986
- Host city: Madrid; Spain
- Venue: Palacio de Deportes
- Events: 22
- Participation: 309 athletes from 27 nations

The 1986 European Athletics Indoor Championships were held at the Palacio de los Deportes in Madrid, Spain, on 22 and 23 February 1986. The track used at the stadium at the time was 164 metres long.

== Medal summary ==
=== Men ===
Event	Gold		Silver		Bronze	
60 metres	Ronald Desruelles (BEL)	6.61	Steffen Bringmann (GDR)	6.64	Bruno Marie-Rose (FRA)	6.65
200 metres	Linford Christie (GBR)	21.10	Aleksandr Yevgenyev (URS)	21.18	Nikolay Razgonov (URS)	21.48
400 metres	Thomas Schönlebe (GDR)	46.98	José Alonso (ESP)	47.12	Mathias Schersing (GDR)	47.59
800 metres	Peter Braun (FRG)	1:48.96	Colomán Trabado (ESP)	1:49.12	Thierry Tonnelier (FRA)	1:49.51
1500 metres	José Luis González (ESP)	3:44.55	José Luis Carreira (ESP)	3:45.07	Han Kulker (NED)	3:46.46
3000 metres	Dietmar Millonig (AUT)	7:59.08	Stefano Mei (ITA)	7:59.12	João Campos (POR)	7:59.15
60 metres hurdles	Javier Moracho (ESP)	7.67	Daniele Fontecchio (ITA)	7.70	Holger Pohland (GDR)	7.71
High jump	Dietmar Mögenburg (FRG)	2.34	Carlo Thränhardt (FRG)	2.31	Eddy Annys (BEL); Geoff Parsons (GBR)	2.28
Pole vault	Atanas Tarev (BUL)	5.70	Marian Kolasa (POL)	5.70	Philippe Collet (FRA)	5.65
Long jump	Robert Emmiyan (URS)	8.32 CR	László Szalma (HUN)	8.24 NR	Jan Leitner (TCH)	8.17
Triple jump	Māris Bružiks (URS)	17.54 CR	Vladimir Plekhanov (URS)	17.21	Béla Bakosi (HUN)	16.93
Shot put	Werner Günthör (SUI)	21.51	Sergey Smirnov (URS)	20.36	Marco Montelatici (ITA)	20.11

=== Women ===
Event	Gold		Silver		Bronze	
60 metres	Nelli Fiere-Cooman (NED)	7.00 CR	Marlies Göhr (GDR)	7.08	Silke Gladisch (GDR)	7.14
200 metres	Marita Koch (GDR)	22.58	Ewa Kasprzyk (POL)	22.96	Kirsten Emmelmann (GDR)	23.28
400 metres	Sabine Busch (GDR)	51.40	Petra Müller (GDR)	51.59	Ann-Louise Skoglund (SWE)	52.40
800 metres	Sigrun Ludwigs (GDR)	1:59.89	Cristeana Matei (ROM)	2:01.54	Slobodanka Čolović (YUG)	2:03.28
1500 metres	Svetlana Kitova (URS)	4:14.25	Tatyana Lebonda (URS)	4:14.29	Mitica Junghiatu (ROM)	4:15.00
3000 metres	Ines Bibernell (GDR)	8:52.52	Yvonne Murray (GBR)	9:01.31	Regina Chistyakova (URS)	9:01.72
60 metres hurdles	Cornelia Oschkenat (GDR)	7.79	Anne Piquereau (FRA)	7.89	Kerstin Knabe (GDR)	7.90
High jump	Andrea Bienias (GDR)	1.97	Gabriele Günz (GDR)	1.94	Larisa Kositsyna (URS)	1.94
Long jump	Heike Drechsler (GDR)	7.18 CR	Helga Radtke (GDR)	6.94	Yelena Kokonova (URS)	6.90
Shot put	Claudia Losch (FRG)	20.48	Heidi Krieger (GDR)	20.21	Mihaela Loghin (ROM)	19.07

== Medal table ==
Rank	Nation	Gold	Silver	Bronze	Total
1	East Germany (GDR)	8	6	5	19
2	Soviet Union (URS)	3	4	4	11
3	West Germany (FRG)	3	1	0	4
4	Spain (ESP)	2	3	0	5
5	Great Britain (GBR)	1	1	1	3
6	Belgium (BEL)	1	0	1	2
6	Netherlands (NED)	1	0	1	2
8	Austria (AUT)	1	0	0	1
8	Bulgaria (BUL)	1	0	0	1
8	Switzerland (SUI)	1	0	0	1
11	Italy (ITA)	0	2	1	3
12	Poland (POL)	0	2	0	2
13	France (FRA)	0	1	3	4
14	Romania (ROU)	0	1	2	3
15	Hungary (HUN)	0	1	1	2
16	Czechoslovakia (TCH)	0	0	1	1
16	Portugal (POR)	0	0	1	1
16	Sweden (SWE)	0	0	1	1
16	Yugoslavia (YUG)	0	0	1	1
Totals (19 entries)		22	22	23	67

== Participating nations ==
- Austria (15)
- Belgium (2)
- Bulgaria (15)
- Cyprus (3)
- Czechoslovakia (20)
- Denmark (2)
- East Germany (23)
- Finland (9)
- France (25)
- Gibraltar (1)
- Great Britain (19)
- Greece (5)
- Hungary (5)
- Iceland (1)
- Ireland (3)
- Italy (19)
- Netherlands (4)
- Poland (16)
- Portugal (8)
- Romania (9)
- Soviet Union (21)
- Spain (37)
- Sweden (8)
- Switzerland (4)
- Turkey (1)
- West Germany (29)
- Yugoslavia (5)

== See also ==
- 1986 in athletics (track and field)
