= Alina Astafei =

Romanian-German track and field athlete

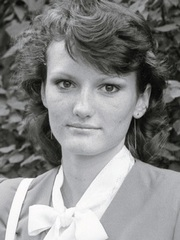
- Astafei in 1992

Personal information
- Nationality: Romanian, German
- Born: 7 June 1969 (age 57) Bucharest, Romania
- Height: 1.82 m (6 ft 0 in)
- Weight: 59 kg (130 lb)

Sport
- Sport: Track and field
- Event: High jump
- Club: USC Mainz (–1997); MTG Mannheim (1998–)
- Coached by: Constantin Dumitrescu

Achievements and titles
- Personal best: 2.04 m (1995)
Medal record
Representing Germany
World Championships
Silver medal – second place	1995 Gothenburg	High jump
European Championships
Bronze medal – third place	1998 Budapest	High jump
World Indoor Championships
Gold medal – first place	1995 Barcelona	High jump
European Indoor Championships
Gold medal – first place	1996 Stockholm	High jump
Silver medal – second place	1998 Valencia	High jump
Representing Romania
Olympic Games
Silver medal – second place	1992 Barcelona	High jump
European Indoor Championships
Gold medal – first place	1989 The Hague	High jump
Bronze medal – third place	1992 Genoa	High jump
Universiade
Gold medal – first place	1989 Duisburg	High jump
- Updated on 19 May 2012

Alina Astafei (known before 1995 as Galina Astafei; born 7 June 1969) is a Romanian-German track and field athlete who attained German citizenship in 1995. She was one of the world's leading high jumpers in the 1990s. Representing Romania, she became the 1992 Olympic silver medallist, while representing Germany, she won a silver medal at the 1995 World Championship and the 1995 world indoor title.

== Career ==
Astafei won the 1987 European Junior title and cleared 2.00 metres to win the 1988 World Junior title. At the 1988 Seoul Olympics, she finished equal fifth in the final with 1.93 metres. Her biggest success for her native Romania was winning the silver medal at the 1992 Olympic Games in Barcelona, Spain, where she cleared 2.00 m.

On 9 January 1995, Astafei left the Romania track and field association and attained German citizenship on 1 March 1995. She won the 1995 World indoor title in Barcelona with a clearance of 2.01 m, before going on to clear 1.99 m to win the silver medal at the 1995 World Championships in Gothenburg, behind Stefka Kostadinova. At her third Olympic Games in 1996, she finished equal fifth with 1.96 m. Her outdoor personal best of 2.01 metres was set in 1995, while she set her indoor best of 2.04 m, earlier the same year.

She became German champion in 1995, 1996, 1998 and 2001 as well as German indoor champion in 1995, 1996, 1997 and 1998. She represented the clubs USC Mainz and MTG Mannheim.

== Achievements ==
In this list, the results through 1994 are for when Astafei represented Romania.

- 1986, Junior World championship: 2nd place (1.90 m)
- 1987, Junior European championship: 1st place (1.88 m)
- 1988, Olympic Games: 5th place (1.93m); Junior World championship: 1st place (2.00 m)
- 1989, World Cup final: 3rd place (1.94 m); Europa Cup final: 1st place (2.00 m)
- 1992, Olympic Games: 2nd place (2.00 m); World Cup final: 2nd place (1.91 m)
- 1993, World championship: 4th place (1.94 m); Europa Cup final: 1st place (2.00 m)
- 1995, World championship: 2nd place (1.99 m); Europa Cup final: 1st place (2.00 m)
- 1996, Olympic Games : 5th place (1.96m); Europa Cup final: 1st place (1.98 m)
- 1997, World championship: 3rd place (1.95 m)
- 1998, European championship: 3rd place (1.95 m); World Cup final: 6th place (1.90 m); Europa Cup final: 2nd place (1.95 m)
- 2001, Europa Cup final: 1st place (1.89 m)

== Personal life ==
Astafei's father is the former Romanian pole vaulter Petre Astafei Sr. Her brother Petre Jr. was a rugby player; he died aged 22 during the 1989 Romanian Revolution. Astafei was married to the Romanian national volleyball player Alin Stavariu, but they divorced before 1995. On 1 March 1995 she obtained German citizenship and later changed her name from Galina to Alina. In Germany she married high jumper Wolfgang Kreißig. She has four children, three with Kreißig and one from the previous marriage.

== See also ==
- Female two metres club
