= 1987 European Athletics Indoor Championships =

- Dates: 21–22 February
- Host city: Liévin; France
- Venue: Stade Couvert Régional
- Events: 24
- Participation: 344 athletes from 26 nations

The 1987 European Athletics Indoor Championships were held at Stade Couvert Régional in Liévin, France, on 21 and 22 February 1987.

== Medal summary ==
=== Men ===
Event	Gold		Silver		Bronze	
60 metres	Marian Woronin (POL)	6.51 CR	Pierfrancesco Pavoni (ITA)	6.58	František Ptáčník (TCH); Antonio Ullo (ITA)	6.61
200 metres	Bruno Marie-Rose (FRA)	20.36 WR-CR	Vladimir Krylov (URS)	20.53	John Regis (GBR)	20.54
400 metres	Todd Bennett (GBR)	46.81	Momchil Kharizanov (BUL)	46.89	Paul Harmsworth (GBR)	46.92
800 metres	Rob Druppers (NED)	1:48.12	Vladimir Graudyn (URS)	1:49.14	Ari Suhonen (FIN)	1:49.56
1500 metres	Han Kulker (NED)	3:44.79	Jens-Peter Herold (GDR)	3:45.36	Klaus-Peter Nabein (FRG)	3:45.84
3000 metres	José Luis González (ESP)	7:52.27	Dieter Baumann (FRG)	7:53.93	Pascal Thiébaut (FRA)	7:54.03
60 metres hurdles	Arto Bryggare (FIN)	7.59	Colin Jackson (GBR)	7.63	Nigel Walker (GBR)	7.65
5000 metres walk	Jozef Pribilinec (TCH)	19:08.44 CR	Ronald Weigel (GDR)	19:08.93	Roman Mrázek (TCH)	19:10.77
High jump	Patrik Sjöberg (SWE)	2.38 CR	Carlo Thränhardt (FRG)	2.36	Hennadiy Avdyeyenko (URS)	2.36
Pole vault	Thierry Vigneron (FRA)	5.85 =CR	Ferenc Salbert (FRA)	5.85	Marian Kolasa (POL)	5.80
Long jump	Robert Emmiyan (URS)	8.49 CR	Giovanni Evangelisti (ITA)	8.26	Christian Thomas (FRG)	8.12
Triple jump	Serge Hélan (FRA)	17.15	Khristo Markov (BUL)	17.12	Nikolay Musiyenko (URS)	17.00
Shot put	Ulf Timmermann (GDR)	22.19 CR	Werner Günthör (SUI)	21.53	Sergey Smirnov (URS)	20.97

=== Women ===
Event	Gold		Silver		Bronze	
60 metres	Nelli Fiere-Cooman (NED)	7.01	Anelia Nuneva (BUL)	7.06	Marlies Göhr (GDR)	7.12
200 metres	Kirsten Emmelmann (GDR)	23.10	Blanca Lacambra (ESP)	23.19	Marie-Christine Cazier (FRA)	23.40
400 metres	Mariya Pinigina (URS)	51.27	Gisela Kinzel (FRG)	52.29	Cristina Pérez (ESP)	52.63
800 metres	Christine Wachtel (GDR)	1:59.89	Sigrun Wodars (GDR)	2:00.59	Lyubov Kiryukhina (URS)	2:01.85
1500 metres	Sandra Gasser (SUI)	4:08.76	Svetlana Kitova (URS)	4:09.01	Ivana Walterová (TCH)	4:09.09
3000 metres	Yvonne Murray (GBR)	8:46.06 CR	Elly van Hulst (NED)	8:51.40	Brigitte Kraus (FRG)	8:53.01
60 metres hurdles	Yordanka Donkova (BUL)	7.79	Gloria Uibel (GDR)	7.89	Ginka Zagorcheva (BUL)	7.92
3000 metres walk	Natalya Dmitrochenko (URS)	12:57.29	Giuliana Salce (ITA)	12:59.11	Monica Gunnarsson (SWE)	13:06.46
High jump	Stefka Kostadinova (BUL)	1.97	Tamara Bykova (URS)	1.94	Susanne Beyer (GDR); Elżbieta Trylińska (POL)	1.91
Long jump	Heike Drechsler (GDR)	7.12	Galina Chistyakova (URS)	6.89	Yelena Belevskaya (URS)	6.76
Shot put	Natalya Akhrimenko (URS)	20.84	Heidi Krieger (GDR)	20.02	Heike Hartwig (GDR)	20.00

== Medal table ==
Rank	Nation	Gold	Silver	Bronze	Total
1	Soviet Union (URS)	4	5	4	13
2	East Germany (GDR)	4	5	3	12
3	France (FRA)	3	1	2	6
4	Netherlands (NED)	3	1	0	4
5	Bulgaria (BUL)	2	3	1	6
6	Great Britain (GBR)	2	1	2	5
7	Spain (ESP)	1	1	1	3
8	Switzerland (SUI)	1	1	0	2
9	Czechoslovakia (TCH)	1	0	3	4
10	Poland (POL)	1	0	2	3
11	Finland (FIN)	1	0	1	2
11	Sweden (SWE)	1	0	1	2
13	West Germany (FRG)	0	3	3	6
14	Italy (ITA)	0	3	1	4
Totals (14 entries)		24	24	24	72

== Participating nations ==
- Austria (7)
- Belgium (13)
- Bulgaria (18)
- Cyprus (1)
- Czechoslovakia (15)
- Denmark (1)
- East Germany (16)
- Finland (12)
- France (41)
- Great Britain (26)
- Greece (3)
- Hungary (8)
- Italy (25)
- Netherlands (12)
- Norway (3)
- Poland (13)
- Portugal (6)
- Romania (3)
- San Marino (1)
- Soviet Union (23)
- Spain (23)
- Sweden (14)
- Switzerland (11)
- Turkey (2)
- West Germany (38)
- Yugoslavia (9)

== See also ==
- 1987 in athletics (track and field)
