= Stefka Kostadinova =

Bulgarian high jumper

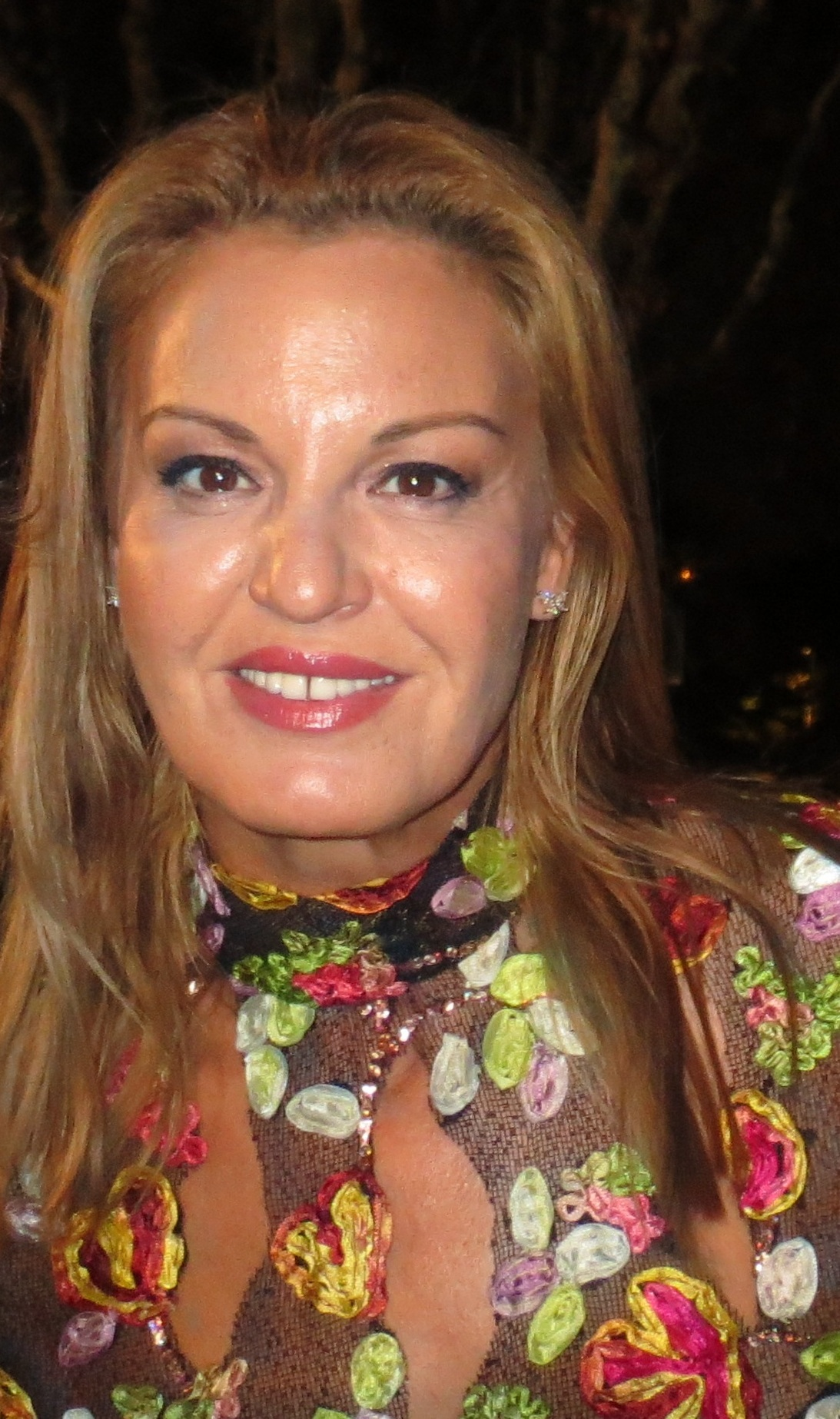

Personal information
- Native name: Стефка Георгиева Костадинова
- Full name: Stefka Georgieva Kostadinova
- Nationality: Bulgarian
- Born: 25 March 1965 (age 61) Plovdiv, Bulgaria
- Years active: 1985–1997
- Height: 1.80 m (5 ft 11 in)
- Weight: 60 kg (132 lb)

Sport
- Country: Bulgaria
- Sport: Athletics
- Event: High jump
- Turned pro: 1985
- Retired: 1997

Achievements and titles
- Olympic finals: 1st (Atlanta, 1996)
- Highest world ranking: 1st (Rome, 1987)
- Personal bests: High jump outdoor: 2.09 m indoor: 2.06 m
Medal record
Women's athletics
Representing Bulgaria
Olympic Games
Gold medal – first place	1996 Atlanta	High jump
Silver medal – second place	1988 Seoul	High jump
World Championships
Gold medal – first place	1987 Rome	High jump
Gold medal – first place	1995 Gothenburg	High jump
European Championships
Gold medal – first place	1986 Stuttgart	High jump
World Indoor Championships
Gold medal – first place	1985 Paris	High jump
Gold medal – first place	1987 Indianapolis	High jump
Gold medal – first place	1989 Budapest	High jump
Gold medal – first place	1993 Toronto	High jump
Gold medal – first place	1997 Paris	High jump
European Indoor Championships
Gold medal – first place	1985 Pireaus	High jump
Gold medal – first place	1987 Liévin	High jump
Gold medal – first place	1988 Budapest	High jump
Gold medal – first place	1994 Paris	High jump
Silver medal – second place	1992 Genoa	High jump
Goodwill Games
Gold medal – first place	1986 Moscow	High Jump
IAAF Grand Prix Final
Gold medal – first place	1985 Rome	High Jump
Gold medal – first place	1987 Brussels	High Jump
Gold medal – first place	1993 London	High Jump
Silver medal – second place	1991 Barcelona	High Jump
IAAF World Cup
Gold medal – first place	1985 Canberra	High Jump
European Cup
Gold medal – first place	1985 Moscow	High Jump
Gold medal – first place	1987 Prague	High Jump
Silver medal – second place	1995 Villeneuve d'Ascq	High Jump
Silver medal – second place	1996 Madrid	High Jump

Stefka Georgieva Kostadinova (Bulgarian: Стефка Георгиева Костадинова; born 25 March 1965) is a Bulgarian former athlete who competed in the high jump. Her world record of 2.09 metres stood since 1987 until being broken by Yaroslava Mahuchikh in 2024. She is the 1996 Olympic champion, a two-time World champion, and a five-time World Indoor champion. She has been the president of the Bulgarian Olympic Committee from 2005 to 2025.

== Early career ==
Born in Plovdiv, Kostadinova went to a specialist sports school, but was only introduced to high jump in a sixth grade (12–13-year-olds) athletics meet in Sofia, on a day she is quoted as saying she would never forget (on TransWorldSport interview in 2012).

== Career ==
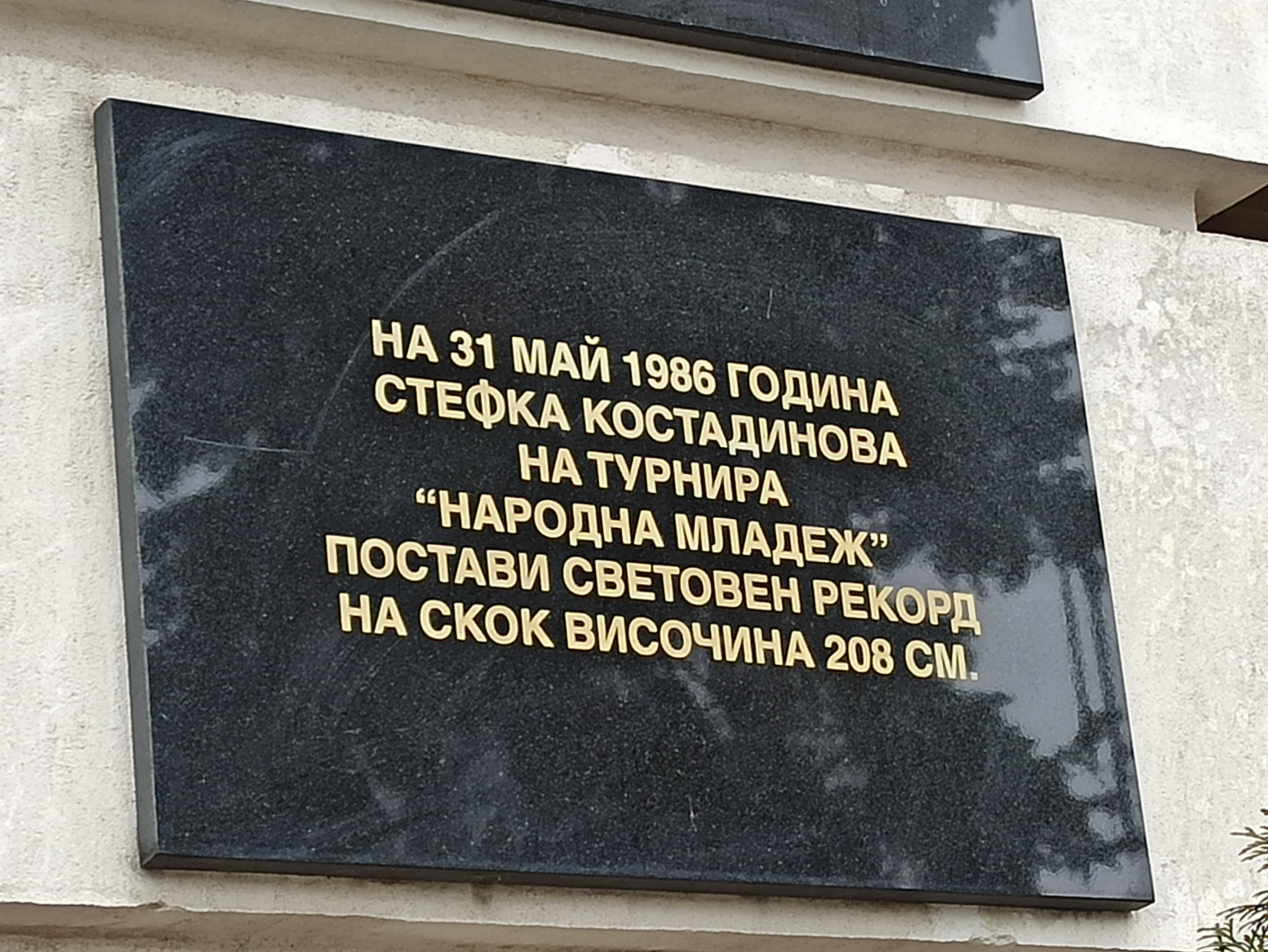
A plaque on Vasil Levski National Stadium, Sofia, Bulgaria, commemorating Kostadinova's world record of 2.08 m set on 31 May 1986

Kostadinova was reigning world record holder in the women's high jump until July 2024. She set a world record of 2.09 m at the 1987 World Championships in Athletics in Rome. Altogether Kostadinova set seven world records - three outdoors and four indoors. She also holds the distinction of having jumped over 2.00 m 197 times.

Kostadinova won the gold medal in the 1996 Summer Olympics in Atlanta, setting an Olympic record of 2.05 m. She also won a silver medal at the 1988 Summer Olympics in Seoul. Kostadinova won the outdoor World Championships in 1987 and 1995. She won the World Indoor Championship five times between 1985 and 1997. Kostadinova also won gold in all European Championships in Athletics in which she competed. She was a European outdoor champion in Stuttgart in 1986 and a four-time European indoor champion in 1985, 1987, 1988, and 1994.

Kostadinova was voted the Bulgarian Sportsperson of the Year four times, in 1985, 1987, 1995 and 1996. She was also named the BTA Best Balkan Athlete of the Year five times, in 1985, 1987, 1995, 1996, and 1997.

== Personal life ==
In 1995 Kostadinova gave birth to her son, Nikolay, just several months before winning gold in the 1995 World Championships in Athletics. In 1999 she divorced her long-standing husband and coach, Nikolay Petrov. The same year she officially put an end to her athletic career, though she had actually not participated in any major sports competition since the World Indoors Championship in 1997. In 2007 Kostadinova married businessman Nikolai Popvasilev.

== Sports administration career ==
After retiring Kostadinova started a career in sports administration. She has served as vice president of the Bulgarian Athletic Federation, vice president of the Bulgarian Olympic Committee and was deputy sports minister of Bulgaria from 2003 through 2005.

On 11 November 2005, Kostadinova was elected president of the Bulgarian Olympic Committee. She replaced Ivan Slavkov, who was expelled by the International Olympic Committee for violating its standards in ethics.

== International competitions ==
Year	Competition	Venue	Position	Notes
Representing Bulgaria
1984	Friendship Games	Prague, Czechoslovakia	4th	1.93 m
1985	World Indoor Games	Paris, France	1st	1.97 m
1985	European Indoor Championships	Piraeus, Greece	1st	1.97 m
1985	World Cup	Canberra, Australia	1st	2.00 m
1986	Goodwill Games	Moscow, Soviet Union	1st	2.03 m
1986	European Championships	Stuttgart, Germany	1st	2.00 m
1987	European Indoor Championships	Liévin, France	1st	1.97 m
1987	World Indoor Championships	Indianapolis, United States	1st	2.05 m
1987	World Championships	Rome, Italy	1st	2.09 m WR
1988	European Indoor Championships	Budapest, Hungary	1st	2.04 m
1988	Olympic Games	Seoul, South Korea	2nd	2.01 m
1989	World Indoor Championships	Budapest, Hungary	1st	2.02 m
1991	World Championships	Tokyo, Japan	6th	1.93 m
1992	European Indoor Championships	Genoa, Italy	2nd	2.02 m
1992	Olympic Games	Barcelona, Spain	4th	1.94 m
1993	World Indoor Championships	Toronto, Canada	1st	2.02 m
1993	World Championships	Stuttgart, Germany	15th (q)	1.90 m
1994	European Indoor Championships	Paris, France	1st	1.98 m
1995	World Championships	Gothenburg, Sweden	1st	2.01 m
1996	Olympic Games	Atlanta, United States	1st	2.05 m
1997	World Indoor Championships	Paris, France	1st	2.02 m

== See also ==
- Bulgaria at the Olympics

Records
Preceded by (Bulgaria) Lyudmila Andonova	Women's High Jump World Record Holder; 1 June 1986 – 7 July 2024	Succeeded by (Ukraine) Yaroslava Mahuchikh
Sporting positions
Preceded by (Bulgaria) Ivan Slavkov	President of the Bulgarian Olympic Committee; 11 November 2005 –	Succeeded by Incumbent
Sporting positions
Preceded by (Bulgaria) Lyudmila Andonova	Women's High Jump Best Year Performance; 1985 – 1988	Succeeded by (Cuba) Silvia Costa
Preceded by (Germany) Heike Henkel	Women's High Jump Best Year Performance; 1992 – 1993	Succeeded by (Cuba) Silvia Costa (Ukraine) Inga Babakova (Slovenia) Britta Bilač
Preceded by (Ukraine) Inga Babakova	Women's High Jump Best Year Performance; 1996 – 1997	Succeeded by (Bulgaria) Venelina Veneva
Preceded by (Bulgaria) Lyudmila Andonova	Women's Bulgarian National Champion; 1985 — 1988	Succeeded by (Bulgaria) Rosanel Gogi
Preceded by (Bulgaria) Svetlana Leseva	Women's Bulgarian National Champion; 1991	Succeeded by (Bulgaria) Lyudmila Andonova
Preceded by (Bulgaria) Venelina Veneva	Women's Bulgarian National Champion; 1996	Succeeded by (Bulgaria) Khristina Kalcheva
