= Andrea Reichstein =

German high jumper

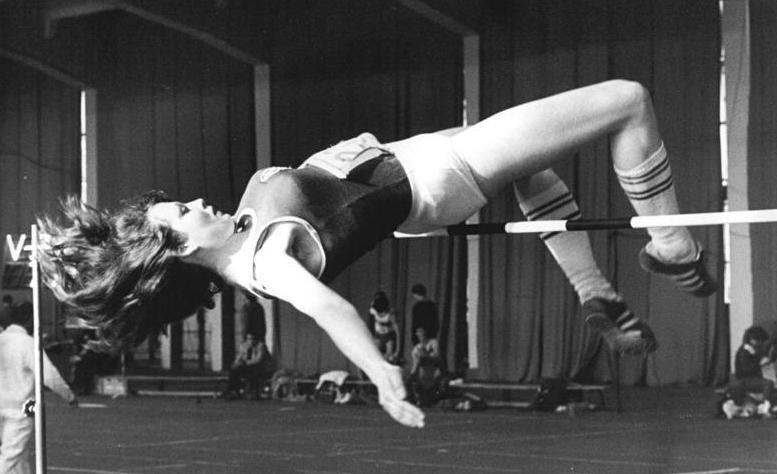
- Andrea Reichstein in 1986

Personal information
- Nationality: German
- Born: 11 November 1959 (age 66)

Sport
- Sport: Athletics
- Event: High jump

Andrea Reichstein or Andrea Bienias (born 11 November 1959) is a German athlete. She competed in the women's high jump at the 1980 Summer Olympics. She cleared 1m 91 cm and was placed sixth. She married the decathlete Gert Bienias in 1981. She was placed first in the European Athletics Indoor Championships in 1986.

She became East German champion in 1981, 1982, 1984 and 1986 and also won two silver and three bronze medals between 1977 and 1985. She also became East German indoor champion in 1986 and took four silvers and one bronze, 1969, 1970 and 1972. She competed for the sports club SC DHfK Leipzig.
