= Madely Beaugendre =

French high jumper (born 1965)

Personal information
- Nationality: France
- Born: 22 September 1965 (age 60) Pointe-à-Pitre

Sport
- Event: High Jump
- Club: Athlétic Club de Cannes

Madely Beaugendre (born 22 September 1965 in Pointe-a-Pitre, Guadeloupe) is a French athlete who specialises in the women's high jump. Beaugendre competed at the 1988 Summer Olympics.

== Biography ==
Madley won four French National Athletic titles in the High Jump: two in Outdoors in 1987 and 1989 and two Indoors in 1987 and 1988.

In 1988, she bettered the French Indoors record in the High Jump jumping 1.96m.

=== Palmarès ===
- French National Outdoors Athletic Championships :
  - winner of High Jump in 1987 and 1989
- French National Indoors Athletic Championships :
  - winner of High Jump in 1987 and 1988

=== Records ===
Records personnels
| Event | Performance | Location | Date |
|---|---|---|---|
| High jump | 1.94 m | | 1989 |
| High jump (Indoors) | 1.96 m | | 1988 |
