= Marina (given name) =

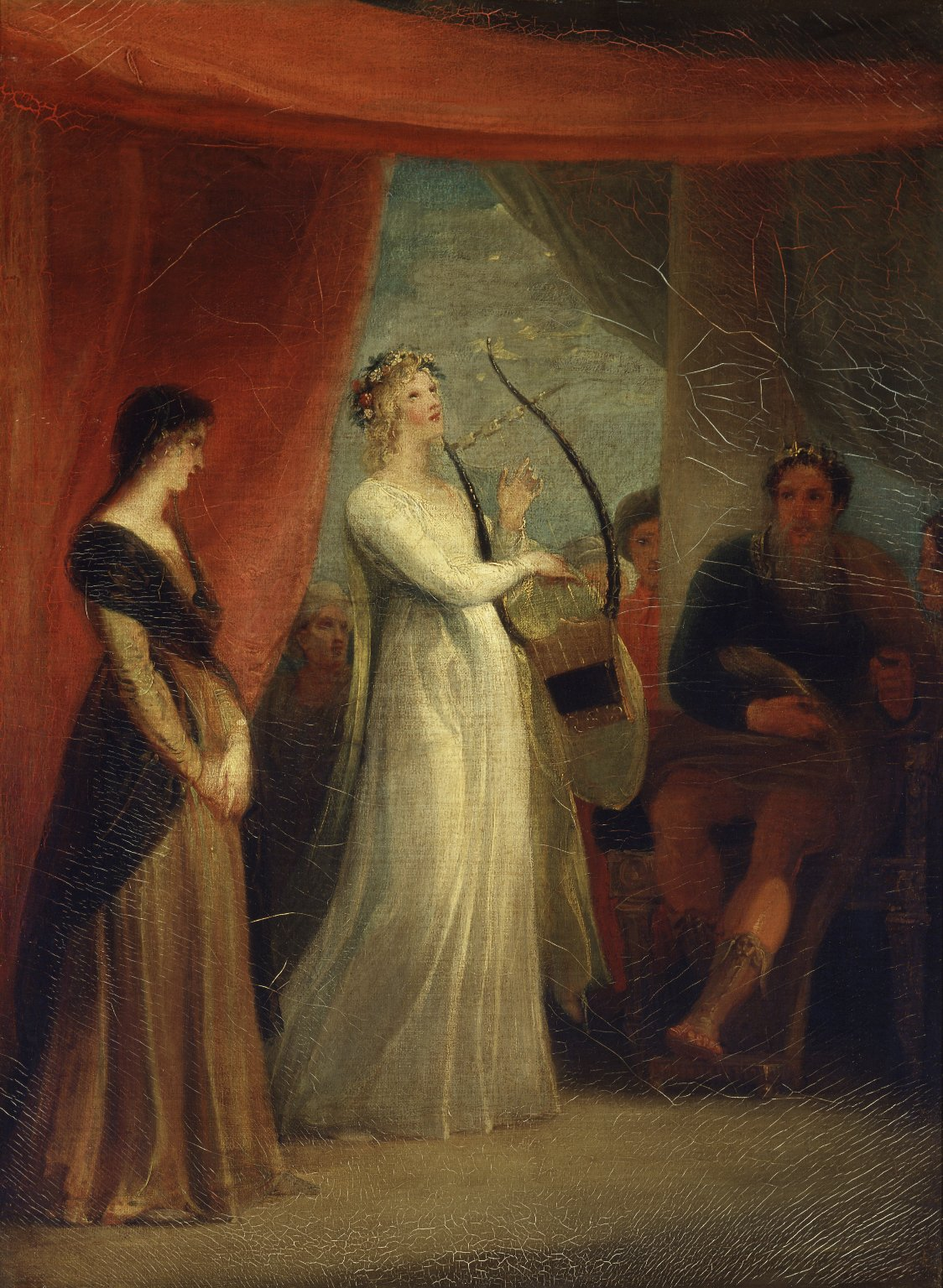
- Marina Singing Before Pericles, a scene from Act V, Scene 1 of William Shakespeare's Pericles, Prince of Tyre by Thomas Stothard, 1825.
- Pronunciation: /məˈriːnə/
- Gender: Female

Other names
- Related names: Marinus, Marius, Marnie

Marina is a feminine given name. It is the female version of the Roman family name Marinus, which is a form of the Latin name Marius. The meaning of Marius might be connected to Mars, the Roman god of war, or with the Latin word maris, meaning virile. It also later became associated with the Latin word marinus, meaning "of the sea".

== Religion ==
- Saint Marina (disambiguation), name of several Christian saints
- Marina de Escobar (1554–1633), Spanish Catholic mystic
- Marina de Guevara (1517–1559), Spanish nun
- Marina de la Caballería (died 1540), Spanish pioneer, settler, noblewoman
- Marina Hociotă (1896–1977), Romanian nun
- Marina of Omura (died 11 November 1634), one of the 16 Martyrs of Japan
- Marina Severa, Roman empress (364–370)
- Marina Tsvigun (born 1960), Ukrainian religious sect leader

== Arts and entertainments ==
- Marina (Japanese singer) (born 1987)
- Marina (Polish singer) (born 1989)
- Marina Abramović (born 1946), Serbian performance artist
- Marina Aleksandrova (born 1982), Russian actress
- Marina Alieva (born 1985), Russian singer
- Marina Allen, American musician
- Marina Amaral (born 1994), Brazilian artist
- Marina Apollonio (born 1940), Italian painter and optical artist
- Marina Arsenijevic (born 1970), Serbian-born American pianist and composer
- Marina Baura (born 1941), Venezuelan telenovela actress
- Marina Benedict (born 1960), American actress
- Marina Berti (1924–2002), Italian film actress
- Marina Blumenthal, Argentine actress
- Marina Busignani Reffi (1930–2006), Sammarinese painter, ceramist and politician
- Marina Camargo (born 1980), Brazilian visual artist
- Marina Cárdenas (1946–2014), Nicaraguan singer
- Marina Chiche (born 1981), French violinist
- Marina Cicogna (1934–2023), Italian film producer and photographer
- Marina Comas (born 1996), Spanish Catalan actress
- Marina Confalone (born 1951), Italian actress
- Marina Costa-Jackson (born 1987), American opera singer
- Marina de Gabaráin (c. 1917–1972), Spanish mezzo-soprano
- Marina de Tavira (born 1974), Mexican actress
- Marina de Van (born 1971), French film director
- Marina DeBris, Australian artist
- Marina Valerievna Demeshchenko, professionally known as polnalyubvi (born 2000), Russian musician
- Marina Devyatova (born 1983), Russian singer and interpreter of Russian traditional music
- Marina Diamandis (born 1985), known as "Marina" and formerly "Marina and the Diamonds", Welsh-Greek singer-songwriter
- Marina Djundyet (born 1986), Moldovan band member
- Marina Domashenko, Russian operatic mezzo-soprano
- Marina Dyuzheva (born 1955), Russian actress
- Marina Eglevsky, American ballet dancer
- Marina Anna Eich (born 1976), German film actress and producer
- Marina Elali (born 1982), Brazilian singer
- Marina Faust (born 1950), Austrian artist
- Marina Fernandez (actress) (born 1981), Croatian actress
- Marina Finlay (born 1961), Australian actress
- Marina Fiorato, Italian-English actress, film producer and author
- Marina Fiordaliso (born 1956), Italian singer
- Marina Foïs (born 1970), French actress
- Marina Franklin (born 1970), American comedian and actress
- Marina Gatell (born 1979), Spanish actress
- Marina Gera (born 1984), Hungarian actress
- Marina Giordana (born 1955), Italian actress
- Marina Goglidze-Mdivani (born 1936), Soviet and Canadian pianist
- Marina Golbahari (born 1989), Tajik-Afghan actress
- Marina Goldovskaya (1941–2022), Soviet and Russian-American documentary film maker
- Marina Golub (1957–2012), Russian actress
- Marina Gordon (1917–2013), American opera singer
- Marina Hands (born 1975), French actress
- Marina Hanser (born 1986), glass artist from Belgium
- Marina Hedman (born 1944), Swedish-Italian pornographic actress
- Marina Herlop (born 1992), Catalan experimental musician
- Marina Inoue (born 1985), Japanese singer and voice actress
- Marina Jacoby (born 1995), Nicaraguan beauty pageant titleholder
- Marina Joesoef (born 1959), Indonesian artist
- Marina Kapoor (born 1987), Peruvian singer, actress, and activist for the rights of transgender people
- Marina Karella (born 1940), Greek artist
- Marina Kawano (born 1990), Japanese singer
- Marina Kaye (born 1998), French singer
- Marina Kazankova (born 1981), Russian actress
- Marina Keegan (1989–2012), American author and playwright
- Marina Khan (born 1962), Pakistani TV actress
- Marina Khlebnikova (born 1965), Russian singer and actress
- Marina Kifferstein (born 1989), American violinist, composer, improviser, and educator
- Marina Kondratyeva (1934–2024), Russian ballet dancer
- Marina Konyashkina (born 1985), Russian actress
- Marina Koshetz (1912–2000), American opera singer
- Marina Kozlovskaya (1925–2019), Soviet and Russian painter
- Marina Kravets (born 1984), Russian actress
- Marina Krilovici (born 1942), German opera singer
- Marina Kulik (born 1956), Dutch painter
- Marina Kuroki (born 1988), Japanese actress and gravure idol
- Marina Kuznetsova (1925–1996), Soviet actress
- Marina Ladynina (1908–2003), Soviet film and theatre actress
- Marina Latorre (born 1925), Chilean writer, journalist and gallerist
- Marina Lazarević (born 1980), Serbian actress
- Marina Lee (1902–1976), Swedish ballet dancer and spy
- Marina Leonardi (born 1970), Italian pianist and composer
- Marina Lima (born 1955), Brazilian singer and songwriter
- Marina Lizorkina (born 1983), Russian singer and former member of girl group Serebro
- Marina Loshak (born 1955), Russian art manager
- Marina Machete (born 1995), Portuguese model
- Marina Malfatti (1933–2016), Italian actress
- Marina Massironi (born 1963), Italian actress
- Marina Maximilian Blumin (born 1987), Israeli singer-songwriter and actress
- Marina Mazepa (born 1997), Ukrainian actress, model, dancer, and contortionist
- Marina Medvetskaya, Georgian prima ballerina
- Marina Nadiradze (born 1978), Georgian pianist
- Marina Nemet (1960–2010), Croatian actress
- Marina Neyolova (born 1947), Soviet actress
- Marina Niava (born 1985), Ivorian film director and producer
- Marina Núñez (born 1966), Spanish artist
- Marina Núñez del Prado (1910–1995), Bolivian sculptor
- Marina Ōno (born 1972), Japanese voice actress
- Marina Orschel (born 1937), German actress and beauty queen
- Marina Orsini (born 1967), Canadian actress
- Marina Osman (born 1965), Belarusian classical and jazz concert pianist
- Marina Papaelia (born c. 1931), Egyptian model
- Marina Perazić (born 1958), Croatian pop-rock singer
- Marina Pérez (born 1984), Spanish model
- Marina Perzy (born 1955), Italian television personality and actress
- Marina Petrova (born 1939), Serbian actress
- Zera (born 2002), professionally known as Marina Pezerović, Serbian singer and rapper
- Marina Piccinini (born 1963), Italian-American flautist
- Marina Pierro (born 1960), Italian actress
- Marina Pombar (born 1947), American sculptor
- Marina Poplavskaya (born 1977), Russian opera singer
- Marina Prior (born 1963), Australian singer and actress
- Marina Rebeka (born 1980), Latvian operatic soprano
- Marina Rei (born 1969), Italian singer-songwriter
- Marina Ribatski (born 1984), Brazilian singer
- Marina Rice Bader, Canadian-American writer, director, and film producer
- Marina Ried (1921–1989), German actress
- Marina Ripa Di Meana (1941–2018), Italian writer, actress, director, stylist and TV personality
- Marina Rollman (born 1988), Swiss comedian
- Marina Rosenfeld, American musician and artist
- Marina Rossell (born 1954), Spanish singer
- Marina Roy, Canadian visual artist and educator
- Marina Ruy Barbosa (born 1995), Brazilian actress
- Marina Ryndzyunskaya (1877–1946), Russian sculptor
- Marina Sagona (born 1967), Italian-American artist
- Marina Salandy-Brown, Trinidadian broadcaster, journalist and cultural activist
- Marina San José (born 1983), Spanish actress
- Marina Sargenti (born 1947), American director, writer and producer
- Marina Satti (born 1986), Greek singer, songwriter, actress and music producer
- Marina Savashynskaya Dunbar, American artist
- Marina Scalafiotti (born 1965), Italian pianist and teacher
- Marina Schiptjenko (born 1965), Swedish electronic pop group member
- Marina Scriabina (1911–1998), Russian artist
- Marina Semyonova (1908–2010), Soviet ballerina
- Marina Sena (born 1996), Brazilian singer-songwriter
- Marina Shimanskaya (born 1955), Russian actress, stage director, pedagogue and drama teacher
- Marina Shiraishi (born 1986), Japanese singer
- Marina Simanovskaya (1978–2002), Russian rapper
- Marina Sirtis (born 1955), British-American actress
- Marina Skugareva (born 1962), Ukrainian artist
- Marina Squerciati (born 1984), American actress
- Marina Strocchi (born 1961), Australian artist
- Marina Suma (born 1959), Italian actress
- Marina Summers (born 1996), Filipino drag performer
- Marina Svetlova (1922–2009), French and American ballerina
- Marina Tadić (born 1983), Serbian pop-folk singer and actress
- Marina Tamayo (1919–2005), Mexican actress
- Marina Tchebourkina (born 1965), French-Russian concert organist and musicologist
- Marina Torres (1901–1967), Spanish actress
- Marina Tsintikidou (born 1971), Greek fashion model and TV presenter
- Marina Tsvetaeva (1892–1941), Russian poet and writer, frequently referred to by her first name
- Marina Tucaković (1953–2021), Serbian lyricist
- Marina Uspenskaya (1925–2007), Russian painter
- Marina Verenikina (born 1978), Russian musician
- Marina Viotti (born 1986), Swiss-French singer
- Marina Marta Vlad (born 1949), Romanian composer
- Marina Vlady (1938–2026), French actress
- Marina von Ditmar (1914–2014), Russian-born German film actress
- Marina Warner (born 1946), English writer, historian and mythographer
- Marina Watanabe (born 1970), Japanese singer and actress
- Marina Willer, Brazilian-born British graphic designer and filmmaker
- Marina Yakhlakova (born 1991), Russian pianist
- Marina Zenovich, American filmmaker
- Marina Zudina (born 1965), Soviet and Russian actress
- Marina Zurkow (born 1962), American artist

== Politics and journalism ==
- Princess Marina, Duchess of Kent (1906–1968), member of the British Royal family, formerly a Greek princess
- Marina Ahmad, British Labour Party politician and trade unionist
- Marina Albiol (born 1982), Spanish politician
- Marina Arismendi (born 1949), Uruguayan politician
- Marina Barampama, Burundian politician
- Marina Bragante (born 1979), Brazilian politician
- Marina Elvira Calderone (born 1965), Italian politician
- Marina Carobbio Guscetti (born 1966), Swiss politician
- Marina Confait, Seychellois foreign affairs secretary
- Marina de Navasal (1922–2016), Chilean journalist, television presenter, and radio announcer
- Marina del Pilar Ávila Olmeda (born 1985), Mexican politician
- Marina Dolgopolova (born 1960), Belarusian diplomat
- Marina Ferrari (born 1973), French politician
- Marina Galanou (died 2021), Greek LGBT activist
- Marina Garay Cabada (born 1953), Mexican politician
- Marina Geli (born 1958), Spanish politician
- Marina Ginestà (1919–2014), French-born Spanish journalist
- Marina Gonçalves (born 1988), Portuguese politician
- Marina Helou (born 1987), Brazilian politician
- Marina Huerta Rosales (born 1934), Chilean politician
- Marina Hyde (born 1974), British journalist
- Marina Ibrahim, Malaysian politician
- Marina JHC (born 1990), Brazilian politician
- Marina Kalashnikova (died 2013), Russian journalist
- Marina Kaljurand (born 1962), Estonian diplomat
- Marina Kandumbu (born 1971), Namibian politician
- Marina Kim (born 1983), Russian journalist and actress
- Marina Kovtun (born 1962), Russian politician
- Marina Lesko, Russian journalist and newspaper editor
- Marina Lipovac Tanasković, Serbian politician
- Marina Litvinovich (born 1974), Russian opposition activist and politician
- Marina Maggessi (1959–2017), Brazilian politician
- Marina Mahathir, Malaysian journalist, daughter of Mahathir bin Mohamad
- Marina Manzanares Monjarás (born 1957), Salvadoran activist
- Marina Matulović-Dropulić (born 1942), Croatian politician
- Marina Mesure (born 1989), French politician
- Marina Mniszech (1588–1614), Polish political adventurer
- Marina Mukabenova (born 1982), Russian politician
- Marina Naprushkina (born 1981), Belarusian artist and democracy activist
- Marina Nikolaou (born 1986), Cypriot politician
- Marina Orgeyeva (born 1959), Russian politician
- Marina Ortega (born 1983), Spanish politician
- Marina Ovsyannikova (born 1978), Russian journalist and TV producer
- Marina Pachinuapa, Mozambican independence fighter and politician
- Marina Pendeš (born 1964), Bosnian-Croatian politician
- Marina Pettersson (born 1955), Swedish politician
- Marina Pisklakova-Parker, Russian women's rights activist
- Marina Prochelle (1941–2022), Chilean politician
- Marina Purkiss (born 1984), British political commentator
- Marina Raguš (born 1969), Serbian politician
- Marina Riofrío (born 1958), Argentine politician
- Marina Ristić, Serbian politician
- Marina Rogacheva (born 1965), Russian politician
- Marina Romanò (born 1960), Italian politician
- Marina Rosenberg, Israeli diplomat
- Marina Salye (1934–2012), Russian politician
- Marina Schuster (born 1975), German politician
- Marina Sereni (born 1960), Italian politician
- Marina Silva (born 1958), Brazilian politician and environmentalist
- Marina Solodkin (1952–2013), Israeli politician
- Marina Sturdza (1944–2017), Romanian journalist
- Marina Tauber (born 1986), Moldovan politician
- Marina Toman, Serbian politician
- Marina Trattner, Swedish lawyer and journalist
- Marina Tsurtsumiya (born 1964), Russian director and activist
- Marina van Zyl, South African politician
- Marina Vondeling (born 1986), Dutch politician
- Marina Weisband (born 1987), German politician
- Marina Yannakoudakis (born 1956), British politician
- Marina Zolotova, Belarusian journalist

== Sports ==
- Marina Abroskina (1967–2011), Russian basketball player
- Marina Aframeeva (born 1991), Russian Olympic dressage rider
- Marina Aganina (born 1985), Uzbekistani figure skater
- Marina Agoues (born 1992), Spanish footballer
- Marina Aitova (born 1982), Kazakhstani high jumper
- Marina Akobiya (born 1975), Russian water polo player
- Marina Akulova (born 1985), Russian volleyball player
- Marina Alabau (born 1985), Spanish windsurfer
- Marina Alex (born 1990), American professional golfer
- Marina Andrievskaya, Soviet Swedish badminton player
- Marina Anissina (born 1975), Franco-Russian ice dancer
- Marina Antonyuk (born 1962), Russian former track and field athlete
- Marina Arruti (born 1972), Spanish professional golfer
- Marina Avstriyskaya (born 1967), Russian pair skater
- Marina Azyabina (born 1963), Russian hurdler
- Marina Babkova (born 1969), Soviet diver
- Marina Bassols Ribera (born 1999), Spanish tennis player
- Marina Bastos (born 1971), Portuguese runner
- Marina Belikova (born 1985), Russian skeet shooter
- Marina Bituleanu, Romanian sprint canoer
- Marina Boduljak (born 1980), Croatian cyclist
- Marina Bravo (born 1989), Spanish rugby sevens player
- Marina Brunello (born 1994), Italian chess player
- Marina Burakova (born 1966), Russian footballer
- Marina Cade (born 1968), Australian former World Champion rower
- Marina Čaljkušić (born 1991), Croatian handball player
- Marina Canetta (born 1989), Brazilian archer
- Marina Canetti (born 1983), Brazilian water polo player
- Marina Canterbury (born 1984), New Zealand rugby union player
- Marina Carrier, Australian modern pentathlon Olympian
- Marina Cergol (born 1965), Italian softball player
- Marina Chan (born 1997), Singaporean swimmer
- Marina Chepurkova (born 1980), Russian swimmer
- Marina Cherkasova (born 1964), Russian retired pair skater
- Marina Cherkasova (skier) (born 1972), Russian freestyle skier
- Marina Chernova (born 1996), Russian acrobatic gymnast
- Marina Chuvirina (born 1947), Soviet tennis player
- Marina Ciucur, Romanian sprint canoer
- Marina Cordenons (born 1969), Italian footballer
- Marina Cordobés (born 1997), Spanish water polo player
- Marina Cortelles (born 2007), Spanish rhythmic gymnast
- Marina Daloca (born 1979), Brazilian volleyball player
- Marina Damlaimcourt (born 1979), Spanish triathlete
- Marina Delgado (born 1995), Argentine footballer
- Marina di Giacomo (born 1976), Argentine field hockey player
- Marina Dmitrović (born 1985), Serbian handball player
- Marina Doria (born 1935), Swiss water-skier
- Marina Dubinina (born 1969), Ukrainian volleyball player
- Marina Durunda (born 1997), Ukrainian-born Azerbaijani rhythmic gymnast
- Marina Eltsova (born 1970), Russian pair skater
- Marina Erakovic (born 1988), New Zealand tennis player
- Marina Escobar (born 1977), Spanish tennis player
- Marina Ewodo (born 1998), French-Cameroonian basketball player
- Marina Fernández (footballer) (born 1996), Andorran footballer
- Marina Fernandez (born 1992), Spanish rhythmic gymnast, cheerleader and model
- Marina Ferragut (born 1972), Spanish basketball player
- Marina Filipović (born 1970), Serbian sprinter
- Marina Fioravanti (born 1993), Brazilian rugby sevens player
- Marina Gajcin (born 2001), Serbian chess player
- Marina Gastl (born 1985), Austrian wrestler
- Marina Georgieva (born 1997), Austrian footballer
- Marina Georgieva-Nikolova (born 1980), Bulgarian speed skater
- Marina Gilardoni (born 1987), Swiss skeleton racer and bobsledder
- Marina Giral Lores (born 1990), Venezuelan tennis player
- Marina Goliadkina (born 1997), Russian synchronized swimmer
- Marina Goncharova (born 1986), Russian heptathlete
- Marina González (born 2002), Spanish artistic gymnast
- Marina Granovskaia (born 1975), Russian-Canadian director of Chelsea Football Club
- Marina Grigoryeva (born 1973), Russian sport shooter
- Marina Gritsenko (born 1980), Kazakhstani water polo player
- Marina Guseva (born 1986), Russian chess player
- Marina Hatzakis (born 1972), Australian rower
- Marina Hegering (born 1990), German footballer
- Marina Himmighofen (born 1984), German footballer
- Marina Iqbal (born 1987), Pakistani cricketer and commentator
- Marina Isan Berga (born 1994), Spanish cyclist
- Marina Ivanova-Kharlamova (born 1962), Soviet sprinter
- Marina Janicke (born 1954), East German diver
- Marina Jaunâtre (born 1982), French cyclist
- Marina Kalaitzieva (born 1979), Greek-Bulgarian volleyball player
- Marina Karaflou (born 1980), Greek shooter
- Marina Karnaushchenko (born 1988), Russian sprinter
- Marina Karpunina (born 1984), Russian basketball player
- Marina Karystinou (born 1976), Greek swimmer
- Marina Keller (born 1984), Swiss footballer
- Marina Khalturina (born 1974), Kazakhstani figure skater
- Marina Khan (bowls) (born 1965), New Zealand bowls player
- Marina Khmelevskaya (born 1990), Uzbekistani athlete
- Marina Kiehl (born 1965), German skier and Olympic gold medalist
- Marina Kielmann (born 1968), German figure skater
- Marina Kiskonen (born 1994), Russian footballer
- Marina Kislova (born 1978), Russian sprinter
- Marina Klimenchenko (born 1966), Russian Paralympic sport shooter
- Marina Klimova (born 1966), Russian figure skater
- Marina Klyuchnikova (born 1959), Russian swimmer
- Marina Köhncke (born 1968), German equestrian
- Marina Kolomiets (born 1972), Russian footballer
- Marina Kolonina (born 1970), Russian modern pentathlete
- Marina Kosheveya (born 1960), Soviet swimmer
- Marina Kovrigina (born 1972), Russian judoka
- Marina Kravchenko (born 1975), Israeli table tennis player
- Marina Kress (born 1980), Belarusian basketball player
- Marina Kroschina (1953–2000), Ukrainian tennis player
- Marina Kuč (born 1985), Montenegrin swimmer
- Marina Kukina (born 1993), Russian rugby sevens player
- Marina Kumysh (born 1964), Soviet volleyball player
- Marina Kuptsova (born 1981), Russian high jumper
- Marina Kurnossova (born 2000), Kazakhstani cyclist
- Marina Kuzhmar (born 1977), Belarusian rower
- Marina Kuzina (born 1985), Russian basketball player
- Marina Kuzmina (born 1978), Azerbaijani volleyball player
- Marina Lalramnghaki Hmar (born 2001), Indian field hockey player
- Marina Lapina (born 1981), Russian-born Azerbaijani hammer thrower
- Marina Laurencon (born 1960), French alpine skier
- Marina Lazarovska (born 1978), Macedonian tennis player
- Marina Lebedeva (born 1985), Kazakhstani biathlete
- Marina Leonidova (born 1958), Russian former pair skater
- Marina Likhanova (born 1990), Russian cyclist
- Marina Lobatch (born 1970), Soviet gymnast
- Marina Loddo (born 1959), Italian long-distance runner
- Marina Logvinenko (born 1961), Russian sport shooter
- Marina Lubian (born 2000), Italian volleyball player
- Marina Lukić (born 1995), Bosnia and Herzegovina footballer
- Marina Mabrey (born 1996), American basketball player
- Marina Makanza (born 1991), French footballer
- Marina Makropoulou (born 1960), Romanian and Greek chess player
- Marina Mališauskienė (born 1966), Lithuanian chess player
- Marina Maljković (born 1981), Serbian basketball coach
- Marina Malpica (born 2000), Mexican rhythmic gymnast
- Marina Mampay (born 1962), Belgian cyclist
- Marina Manakov (born 1969), German chess player
- Marina Marik (born 1969), Bulgarian volleyball player
- Marina Marković (born 1991), Serbian basketball player
- Marina Maslyonko (born 1982), Kazakhstani sprinter
- Marina Matrossova (born 1990), Kazakhstani cross-country skier
- Marina Mazić (born 1980), Croatian basketball player
- Marina Melnikova (born 1989), Russian tennis player
- Marina Moffa (born 1964), Australian basketball player
- Marina Mohnen (born 1978), German wheelchair basketball player
- Marina Mokhnatkina (born 1988), Russian MMA fighter
- Marina Mulyayeva (born 1981), Kazakhstani swimmer
- Marina Munćan (born 1982), Serbian middle-distance runner
- Marina Nekrasova (born 1995), Russian-born Azerbaijani artistic gymnast
- Marina Nichișenco (born 1986), Moldovan hammer thrower
- Marina Nigg (born 1984), Liechtenstein alpine skier
- Marina Niyazgulova (born 1995), Russian chess player
- Marina Nohalez (born 1974), Spanish footballer
- Marina Novak (born 1991), Liechtenstein tennis player
- Marina Pankova (1963–2015), Russian volleyball player
- Marina Panteleyeva (born 1989), Russian sprinter
- Marina Pantić (born 1988), Serbian handball player
- Marina Pellizzer (born 1972), Italian footballer
- Marina Pestova (born 1964), Soviet pair skater
- Marina Pettersson-Engström (born 1987), Swedish footballer
- Marina Pikalova (born 1985), Kazakhstani handball player
- Marina Piller (born 1984), Italian cross-country skier
- Marina Piredda (born 2002), Italian figure skater
- Marina Pons, Spanish sports shooter
- Marina Pupina (born 1977), Kazakhstani speed skater
- Marina Pushkareva (born 1989), Russian footballer
- Marina Puškar (born 1982), Serbian basketball player
- Marina Pylayeva (born 1966), Russian speed skater
- Marina Radu (born 1984), Canadian water polo player
- Marina Rajčić (born 1993), Montenegrin handball player
- Marina Razum (born 1992), Croatian handball player
- Marina Rodriguez (born 1987), Brazilian MMA Fighter
- Marina Rodríguez (weightlifter) (born 1995), Cuban weightlifter
- Marina Saenko (born 1975), Russian footballer
- Marina Saito (born 1995), Japanese javelin thrower
- Marina Sanaya (1959–2016), Russian figure skater
- Marina Sánchez (born 1977), Spanish sailor
- Marina Schnider (born 1986), Swiss sport shooter
- Marina Schuck (born 1981), German canoeist
- Marina Sciocchetti (born 1958), Italian equestrian
- Marina Sedneva (born 1996), Kazakhstani freestyle wrestler
- Marina Seeh (born 1986), Serbian former figure skater
- Marina Sergina (born 1986), Russian ice hockey forward
- Marina Serkova (born 1961), Soviet high jumper
- Marina Shafir (born 1988), Moldovan professional wrestler and mixed martial artist
- Marina Shainova (born 1986), Russian weightlifter
- Marina Shamal (born 1939), Russian swimmer
- Marina Shamayko (born 1987), Russian tennis player
- Marina Sheremetieva (born 1963), Moldovan chess player
- Marina Sheshenina (born 1985), Russian volleyball player
- Marina Shmayankova (born 1993), Belarusian cyclist
- Marina Shmonina (born 1965), Uzbek sprinter
- Marina Shults (born 1994), Israeli rhythmic gymnast
- Marina Shumakova (born 1983), Kazakhstani table tennis player
- Marina Sisoeva (born 1993), Uzbekistani weightlifter
- Marina Skordi (born 1962), Greek sprinter
- Marina Smorodina (born 1966), Soviet rower
- Marina Soboleva (born 1961), Soviet fencer
- Marina Solopova (born 1990), Lithuanian basketball player
- Marina Stakusic (born 2004), Canadian tennis player
- Marina Stefanoni (born 2002), American squash player
- Marina Stepanova (born 1950), Russian former athlete
- Marina Stets (born 1973), Belarusian tennis player
- Marina Sudakova (born 1989), Russian handball player
- Marina Sulicich (born 1964), Australian gymnast
- Marina Sumić (born 1991), Croatian taekwondo practitioner
- Marina Suprun (born 1962), Soviet rower
- Marina Sysoyeva (born 1959), Soviet-Kyrgyz high jumper
- Marina Szendey (born 1971), Hungarian archer
- Marina Tankaskaya (born 1983), Azerbaijani handball player
- Marina Tavares (born 1984), Brazilian tennis player
- Marina Timofeieva (born 1984), Estonian ice dancer
- Marina Tomić (born 1983), Slovenian hurdler
- Marina Toribiong (born 1994), Palauan canoeist
- Marina Tozzini, Italian Paralympic swimmer
- Marina Trandenkova (born 1967), Russian sprinter
- Marina Trofimova (born 1964), Estonian swimmer
- Marina Tumas (born 1981), Belarusian volleyball player
- Marina van der Merwe (born 1937), Canadian field hockey coach
- Marina Vasarmidou (born 1972), Greek sprinter
- Marina Vidović (born 1973), Yugoslav alpine skier
- Marina Viejo (born 1996), Spanish rhythmic gymnast
- Marina Volnova (born 1989), Kazakhstani boxer
- Marina Wallner (born 1994), German alpine skier
- Marina Wilke (born 1958), German rowing cox
- Marina Yachmenyova (born 1961), Russian middle-distance runner
- Marina Yakusheva (born 1974), Russian badminton player
- Marina Yurchenya (born 1959), Ukrainian swimmer
- Marina Zablith (born 1987), Brazilian water polo player
- Marina Zarma (born 1978), Cypriot swimmer
- Marina Zarzhitskaya (born 1981), Belarusian artistic gymnast
- Marina Zgurscaia (born 1989), Moldovan female sport shooter
- Marina Zhirova (born 1963), Soviet sprinter
- Marina Zhukova (born 1966), Russian rower
- Marina Znak (born 1961), Belarusian rower
- Marina Zoueva (born 1956), Russian ice dancer and figure skating coach

== Others ==
- Marina, better known as 'La Malinche', Nahua interpreter, advisor, and paramour of Hernán Cortés (died 1529)
- Marina Abràmova, Russian expert in Catalan culture
- Marina Arrate (born 1957), Chilean poet and clinic psychologist
- Marina Artuso, particle physicist at Syracuse University
- Marina Baker (born 1967), British politician, writer, actor and former model
- Marina Bartsyts (born 1964), ethnologist from Abkhazia
- Marina Basmanova (born 1938), Russian illustrator
- Marina Bennati, German physicist
- Marina Berlusconi (born 1966), Italian businesswoman
- Marina Umaschi Bers, American child educator and computer scientist
- Marina Blagojević (1958–2020), Serbian sociologist
- Marina Boroditskaya, Russian children's poet and translator
- Marina Borovskaya (born 1964), Russian scientist
- Marina Bosi, Italian audio engineer
- Marina Brogi (born 1967), Italian economist and author
- Marina Budhos, American writer
- Marina Butovskaya, Russian ethologist and cultural anthropologist
- Marina Carr (born 1964), Irish playwright
- Marina Carrère d'Encausse (born 1961), French physician and author
- Marina Caskey (born 1978), Brazilian immunologist
- Marina Catena, Italian humanitarian
- Marina Chafroff (1908–1942), Belgian resistance fighter
- Marina Chapman (born c. 1950), Colombian-born British woman
- Marina Chechneva (1922–1984), hero of the Soviet Union
- Marina Cisternas (1897–1992), Chilean-American actress, writer, and journalist
- Marina Colasanti (1937–2025), Italian-Brazilian writer, translator and journalist
- Marina Cunin, American social anthropologist
- Marina Di Guardo (born 1961), Italian writer
- Marina Dizon (1875–1951), Filipino revolutionary
- Marina Dubina, Belarusian environmentalist
- Marina Elliott, Canadian biological anthropologist
- Marina Endicott (born 1958), Canadian writer
- Marina Fischer-Kowalski (born 1946), Austrian sociologist and social ecologist
- Marina Frolova-Walker (born 1966), Russian-born British musicologist
- Marina Galand, atmospheric physicist and lecturer
- Marina Galina, Venetian dogaressa (d. 1420)
- Marina Gamba (c. 1570–1612), Italian woman
- Marina Garcés (born 1973), Spanish philosopher
- Marina Gavrilova, Russian-Canadian computer scientist
- Marina Gershenovich (born 1960), Russian poet and translator
- Marina Granovskaia (born 1975), Russian-Canadian executive and former Chelsea F.C. director
- Marina Gržinić (born 1958), Slovenian philosopher and theoretician
- Marina Guenza, Italian chemist
- Marina Halac (born 1979), Argentine economist
- Marina Huerta, Argentinian theoretical physicist
- Marina Iliopoulou, Greek mathematician
- Marina Jirotka, professor at the University of Oxford
- Marina Joubert (born 1963), South African science communication researcher
- Marina Karaseva (born 1958), Russian musicologist
- Marina Karyagina (born 1969), Chuvash poet, novelist and playwright, TV journalist, documentary director and editor
- Marina Keegan (1989–2012), American author and playwright
- Marina Kosteņecka (born 1945), Latvian-born Russian writer, publicist, and public figure
- Marina Lambraki-Plaka (c. 1939–2022), Greek historian, archaeologist, and academic
- Marina Lewycka (1946–2025), British novelist of Ukrainian origin
- Marina Logares, Spanish mathematician
- Marina Ama Omowale Maxwell (1934–2024), Trinidadian playwright, performer, poet and novelist
- Marina Mayoral (born 1942), Spanish writer
- Marina Medvin, American criminal defense attorney
- Marina Minina (born 1972), Russian physician
- Marina Mizzau (1936–2023), Italian writer
- Marina Murillo, Salvadoran architect and politician
- Marina Nani, Venetian dogaressa (d. 1473)
- Marina Nemat (born 1965), Russian-Iranian-Canadian author
- Marina Nespor (born 1949), Italian professor of linguistics
- Marina Ogilvy (born 1966), daughter of Princess Alexandra
- Marina Oliver (born 1934), British novelist
- Marina Ortiz de Gaete (c. 1509–1592), wife of Pedro de Valdivia
- Marina Oshana, American philosopher
- Marina Otero, Spanish architect
- Marina Ottaway, academic
- Marina Palei (born 1955), Russian-Dutch writer and poet
- Marina Papaelia, Greek-Egyptian Miss World contestant
- Marina Perezagua, Spanish novelist
- Marina Petrella (born 1954), Italian assassin
- Marina Petrukhina (born 1963), Russian chemist
- Marina Picasso (born 1950), French humanitarian and granddaughter of Pablo Picasso
- Marina Picciotto (born 1963), American neuroscientist
- Marina Popovich (1931–2017), Soviet Air Force colonel, engineer and test pilot
- Marina Oswald Porter (born 1941), widow of Lee Harvey Oswald, the presumed assassin of U.S. President John F. Kennedy
- Marina Querini (1757–1839), Venetian salon-holder
- Marina Raphael, fashion designer
- Marina Raskova (1912–1943), Russian Navigator
- Marina Ratner (1938–2017), Russian mathematician
- Marina Rodnina (born 1960), German biochemist
- Marina Romanova, Russian-American computational astrophysicist
- Marina Ruggles-Wrenn, American aerospace and mechanical engineer
- Marina Rustow, American historian
- Marina Sabatier (2001–2009), French murder victim
- Marina Sáenz, professor of Commercial Law at the University of Valladolid
- Marina Salamon (born 1958), Italian entrepreneur
- Marina Schiano (1941–2019), Italian model, muse, stylist, journalist, photographer and jewelry designer
- Marina Simian (born 1971), Argentine biologist and science communicator
- Marina Stavenhagen (born 1962), Mexican screenwriter and film director
- Marina Stepnova (born 1971), Russian writer and poet
- Marina Știrbei (1912–2001), Romanian aviator
- Marina Šur Puhlovski, Croatian writer
- Marina Tabassum, Bangladeshi architect
- Marina Tarkovskaya (1934–2024), Russian writer and critic
- Marina Tarlinskaja, American linguist
- Marina Thottan, computer scientist
- Marina Tognetti (born 1964), Italian entrepreneur and business executive
- Marina Toybina (born 1981), American costume and fashion designer
- Marina Vaizey (born 1938), Anglo-American art critic, broadcaster, exhibition curator, author and journalist
- Marina Vannucci (born 1966), Italian statistician
- Marina Vega (1923–2011), Spanish spy for the French Resistance
- Marina Vishmidt (1976–2024), American writer
- Marina Voikhanskaya (born 1934), Soviet-British psychiatrist
- Marina von Neumann Whitman (1935–2025), American economist, writer and automobile executive
- Marina Voroshilova (1922–1986), Soviet microbiologist and biologist
- Marina Waisman (1920–1997), Argentine architect, critic and writer
- Marina Weisband (born 1987), German author, psychologist and politician
- Marina Wheeler (born 1964), British writer, lawyer and columnist
- Marina Wolf, American neuroscientist
- Marina Yee (1958–2025), Belgian fashion designer
- Marina Yurlova (1900–1984), Russian child soldier and author
- Marina Zerova (1934–2021), Ukrainian zoologist

== Disambiguation ==
- Marina Fedorova, various people
- Marina García, various people
- Marina Orlova, various people

== Fictional characters ==
- Marina, principal love interest of Howard in the BBC sitcom series Last of the Summer Wine
- Marina, the daughter of the leading character Prince Pericles of Tyre in the play Pericles, Prince of Tyre (1608) by William Shakespeare and (probably) George Wilkins
- Marina, title character in George Lillo's play Marina (1738), based on the preceding
- Marina (aka "Number Seven"), one of the main protagonists in the Lorien Legacies series by Pittacus Lore
- Marina, an octopus villager from the video game series Animal Crossing
- Marina Liteyears, the main protagonist of Treasure's Mischief Makers video game
- Marina, the young mermaid in the TV series Stingray
- Marina, title character in telenovela Marina
- Marina Ismail, a Middle-Eastern princess from the anime Mobile Suit Gundam 00
- Marina (Peggle), one of the Peggle Masters that was first seen in Peggle Nights
- Marina, a main character in the Nickelodeon TV series The Fresh Beat Band and its spin-off Fresh Beat Band of Spies
- Marina, in the 1975 animated film Hans Christian Andersen's The Little Mermaid
- Marina Ferrer, a minor character in The L Word
- Marina Green, a Fishtronaut character
- Marina Cooper Lewis, a character on the television soap opera Guiding Light
- Marina Ida, one of the members of the fictional band Off The Hook from the video game Splatoon 2
- Marina Romanova, a main character appearing in season 3 and season 6 of a detective-themed video game Criminal Case
- Marina Tsukishima, in the anime BanG Dream! and in the game BanG Dream! Girls Band Party!
- Marina (aka "Water Pirate"), in the Disney Junior animated series Jake and the Never Land Pirates
- Marina, in the online game Pixie Hollow and the TV special Pixie Hollow Games
- Marina, an NPC (Non-Player Character) in Hypixel's MMORPG gamemode, Skyblock
- Marina, an anthropomorphic penguin in the 1995 animated film The Pebble and the Penguin
- Marina, in the 2011 film Pirates of the Caribbean: On Stranger Tides
- Marina, a main character in the French animated series Zig & Sharko
- Marina Kirarazaka, a character in the web manga series "Takopi's Original Sin"
