= Pellizzer =

Pellizzer is an Italian surname. Notable people with the surname include:

- Marina Pellizzer (born 1972), Italian footballer
- Mark "Pelli" Pellizzer (born 1980), Canadian musician
- Michele Pellizzer (born 1989), Italian footballer
- Valentina Pellizzer, human rights activist and writer
