= Petrukhin =

Petrukhin, feminine: Petrukhina, is a surname of Russian origin formed from the diminutive Petrukha, of the given name Pyotr. People with that name include:

- Aleksey Petrukhin (born 1973), Russian film actor, film director, screenwriter, producer and writer
- Marina Petrukhina (born 1963), Russian and American chemist
- Vladimir Petrukhin (born 1950), Russian historian, archaeologist and ethnographer
- Vyacheslav Petrukhin (born 1953), Russian footballer

== Fictional characters ==
- Samuel Petrukhin from Summer of Rockets, 2019 British Cold War television miniseries
