= Lazarević =

Lazarević (Serbian Cyrillic: Лазаревић) is a South Slavic surname derived from a masculine given name Lazar.

The Lazarević dynasty was a noble Serbian medieval dynasty in the 14th and 15th centuries.

Notable people with the surname include:

- Branko Lazarević (born 1984), Serbian football player
- Dejan Lazarević (footballer) (born 1990), Slovenian professional football player
- Laza Lazarević (1851–1891), Serbian writer and psychiatrist
- Lazar Lazarević (1838–1919), Croatian Catholic priest
- Marina Lazarević (born 1980), Serbian actress
- Milan Lazarević (handballer) (born 1948), Yugoslav handball player
- Milan Lazarević (footballer) (born 1997), Serbian footballer
- Milunka Lazarević (born 1932), Serbian chess player and journalist
- Mladen Lazarević (born 1984), Serbian football defender currently playing for KV Kortrijk
- Nina Linta Lazarević (born 1976), Serbian actress
- Stefan Lazarević (1374–1427), Serbian Despot
- Vladimir Lazarević (born 1949), Serbian colonel general
- Vojin Lazarević (born 1942), Yugoslav striker who played for SFR Yugoslavia
- Vuk Lazarević (1380–1410), the younger son of Tsar Lazar
- Zoran Lazarević (basketball player) (born 1947), Serbian basketball player
- Zoran Lazarević (general) (born 1967), Montenegrin general
- Zoran Lazarević (Uncharted), a character in the video game Uncharted 2: Among Thieves

== See also ==
- Despot Stefan Lazarević Memorial, located in the village of Crkvine by Mladenovac, Serbia
