= Oshana (surname) =

Oshana is a surname. Notable people with the surname include:

- Anwar Oshana (born 1972), Assyrian-American professional boxer
- Marina Oshana (fl. 2006), American philosopher
- Nancy Oshana Wehbe (born 1975), Assyrian-American bodybuilder
