= Lucía Lijtmaer =

Argentine journalist, writer (born 1977)

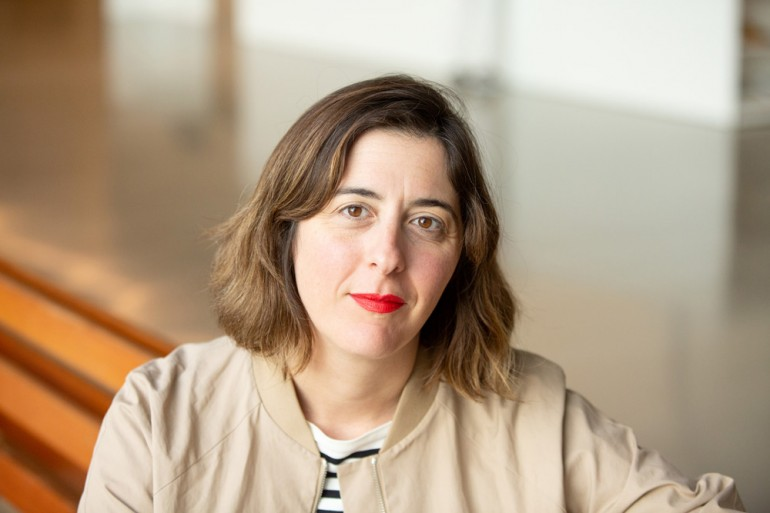
- Born: Lucía Lijtmaer Paskvan; 1977 (age 48–49); Buenos Aires, Argentina
- Education: University of Westminster
- Occupations: Journalist, writer, translator
- Website: lucialijtmaer.net

Lucía Lijtmaer Paskvan (born 1977) is a journalist and writer born in Argentina and raised in Barcelona, where her parents went into exile. She is a specialist in pop culture from a gender perspective. She is also cultural curator, literary translator, and university professor. She currently writes for various media, including El País, El Diario, and Carne cruda.

== Career ==
The daughter of Argentine exiles, she grew up in Barcelona. She has a licentiate in English Philology from the University of Barcelona and a Master's in International Journalism from the University of Westminster. She specializes in pop culture and writes for various media. She has taught at the University of Vic's Faculty of Digital Communication and the University of Barcelona.

She is also curator of the festival "Princesas y Darthvaders", mixing humor and guerrilla culture to talk about feminism. In 2018 it celebrated its fourth edition.

Lijtmaer recognizes herself as a second-generation exile, and addresses this in the presentation of her first novel Casi nada que ponerte, in which she tackles the reconstruction of the immediate past of a country, Argentina, which exploded in 2001, and the construction of her own personality as the daughter of exiles in Spain. Research for this started in 2008, and her first draft was completed in 2011. It remained in a drawer for a time until the publisher Libros del Lince decided to publish it in 2016.

In 2015, Lijtmaer carried out a first-person investigation into the deep web that she published with the title Quiero los secretos del Pentágono y los quiero ahora (I Want the Secrets of the Pentagon and I Want Them Now).

In 2017 she published Yo también soy una chica lista, a casual essay in defense of feminism in which the invisible macho mechanisms of pop culture are revealed.

She has written, among other periodicals, for ADN and Público, contributes regularly in the media, has been a university professor, has done radio, and has translated for English musician Jarvis Cocker. She currently writes for El País, El Diario, and Carne cruda.

Along with Isa Calderón she stars in the biweekly theatrical production Deforme Semanal, a feminist show where, in a humorous way, they criticize the heteropatriarchy.

== Publications ==
- Quiero los secretos del Pentágono y los quiero ahora (2015). Capitán Swing. ISBN 9788494367687.
- Casi nada que ponerte (2016). Libros del Lince. ISBN 9788415070658.
- Cultura en tensión (2016). Various authors: Jordi Oliveras Serrano, Nando Cruz, Lucía Lijtmaer, César Rendueles, Marina Garcés, Ramon Faura, and Joan Miquel Gual. Rayo Verde. Collection: Ciclogénesis. ISBN 9788416689002.
- Yo también soy una chica lista (2017). Editorial Destino. ISBN 9788423352357.
- Ofendiditos (2019). Editorial Anagrama. ISBN 9788433916303.
