= Thottan =

Thottan is an Indian surname. Notable people with the surname include:

- J. D. Thottan (1922–1997), Indian director of Malayalam-language films
- Lijo David Thottan (born 1974), Indian sprinter
- Marina Thottan, computer scientist
- John Thottan, Creative Director
