= Brogi =

Brogi is an Italian surname. It is a shortening of Ambrogi. Notable people with the surname include:

- Angelica Brogi (born 1998), Italian professional racing cyclist
- Giacomo Brogi (1822–1881), Italian photographer
- Giulio Brogi (1935–2019), Italian actor
- Marco Dino Brogi (1932–2020), Vatican diplomat
- Marina Brogi (born 1967), Italian economist
