= Marina Minina =

Russian physician

- Марина Минина
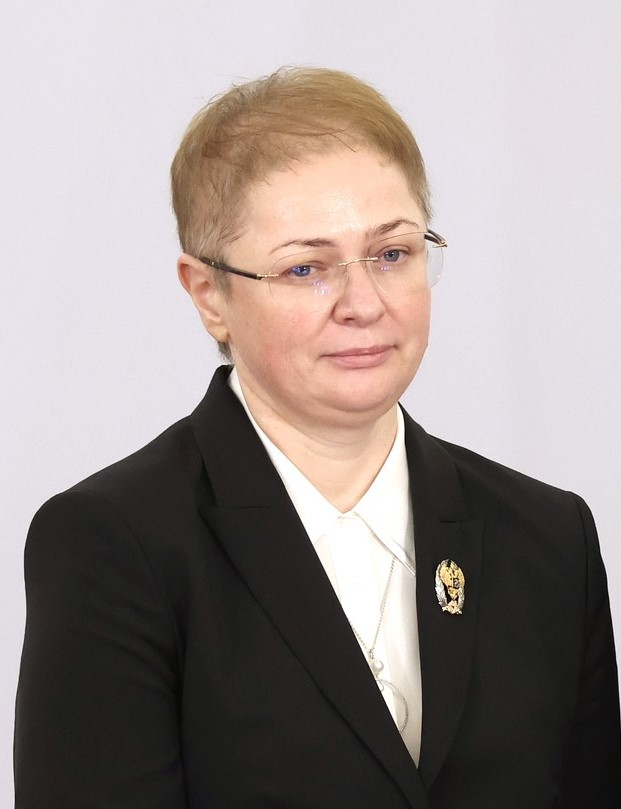
- Born: 22 May 1972 (age 54); Shakhty, Soviet Union
- Education: Rostov State Medical University
- Occupation: Physicist
- Employer: Botkin Hospital
- Awards: (2023)
- Scientific career
- Doctoral advisor: Sergey Gauthier

Marina Gennadyevna Minina (Russian: Марина Геннадьевна Минина; born 14 May 1972) is a Russian physician who is serving as head of the Moscow City Coordination Center for Organ Donation of the Moscow Botkin Multidisciplinary Scientific-Clinical Center in Moscow.

== Biography ==
She studied medicine at the Rostov State Medical University. She developed and scientifically substantiated fundamentally new approaches to the comprehensive assessment of donor organs for transplantation, the implementation of which contributes to the rational distribution of donor organs, harmonization of the donation system and increased accessibility of transplantation. She developed Scientifically substantiated and implemented the principles of transplant coordination. She also developed a new organizational model of healthcare - a center for collective use in relation to donation, which made it possible to increase the accessibility, volume and quality of transplant care for citizens of Russia. Her thesis title was Development and Implementation in Practice of Healthcare Innovate Model of Organ Donation. In 2024 she was awarded the State Prize of the Russian Federation for the development, scientific substantiation and implementation in the practice of domestic healthcare of original technologies for transplantation of vital organs.
