= Catriona Mackenzie =

Australian philosopher

Catriona Alice Mackenzie (born 1960) is an Australian philosopher. She is professor emerita of philosophy at Macquarie University and a Fellow of the Australian Academy of the Humanities. Mackenzie has published in moral and political philosophy, feminist philosophy and applied ethics.

== Life ==
Mackenzie was born in 1960. She gained her PhD at the National University of Australia. Her thesis, Embodying Autonomy: Women and Moral Agency (1991), was supervised by Genevieve Lloyd, Kim Lycos and Moira Gatens.

Mackenzie taught at Monash University for two years, before joining Macquarrie University. She was a visiting fellow at Princeton University in 1990. In 2007 Mackenzie was awarded the Australian Museum's Eureka Prize for Research in Ethics.

Mackenzie became Professor in the Department of Philosophy at Macquarie University. From 2011 to 2020 she was the founding Director of Macquarie's Research Centre for Agency, Values and Ethics (CAVE). From 2013 to 2018 she was Associate Dean (Research) for Macquarie University Faculty of Arts.

From 2010 to 2012 Mackenzie was a member of the Humanities and Creative Arts Panel of the ARC College of Experts. She received a Jim Piper award for Research Leadership at Macquarie University in 2013. In 2014 she was elected a Fellow of the Australian Academy of the Humanities.

She was the partner of fellow Macquarrie philosopher Peter Menzies, who died in 2015.

== Works ==
- (ed. with Natalie Stoljar) Relational Autonomy: Feminist Perspectives on Autonomy, Agency, and the Social Self. Oxford University Press, 2000.
- (ed. with Kim Atkins) Practical Identity and Narrative Agency. Routledge, 2007.
- (ed. with Robyn Langton) Emotions, Imagination, and Moral Reasoning. Psychology Press, 2012.
- (ed. with Wendy Rogers and Susan Dodds) Vulnerability: New Essays in Ethics and Feminist Philosophy. Oxford University Press, 2013.
- (with Mary Walker) 'Neurotechnologies, Personal Identity, and the Ethics of Authenticity'. In Jens Clausen and Neil Levy, eds., Handbook of Neuroethics. Dortrecht: Springer, pp. 373–392.
- (ed. with Marina Oshana and Katrina Hutchison) Social Dimensions of Moral Responsibility. Oxford University Press, 2018.
- (ed. with Denise Meyerson and Therese MacDermott) Procedural Justice and Relational Theory: Empirical, Philosophical, and Legal Perspectives. Routledge, 2021.
