= Sergey Gauthier =

Sergey Vladimirovich Gauthier
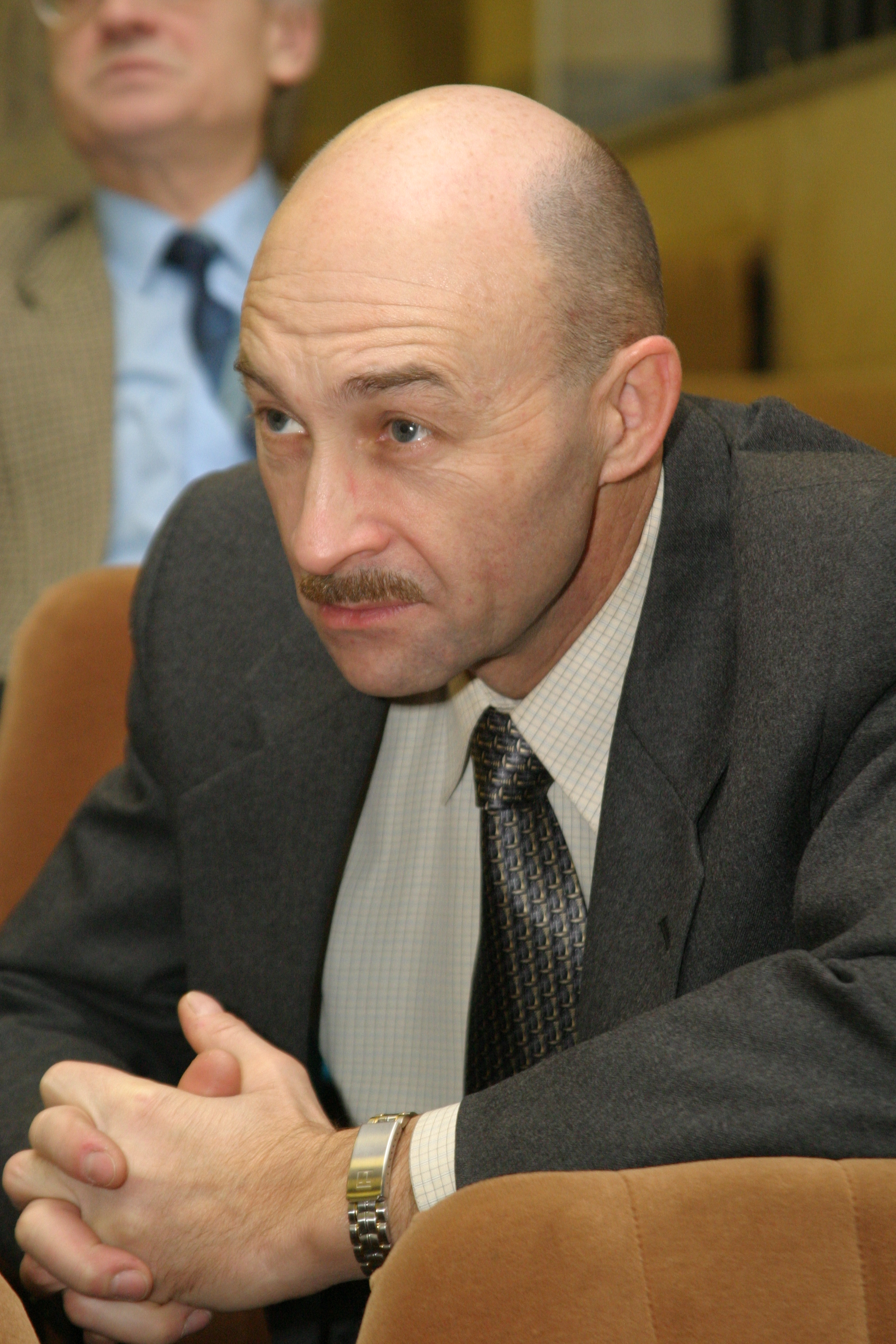
- Born: September 23, 1947; Moscow
- Education: I.M. Sechenov First Moscow State Medical University
- Scientific career
- Fields: Transplant surgery
- Workplaces: V.I. Shumakov National Medical Research Center of Transplantology and Artificial Organs of the Ministry of Healthcare of the Russian Federation; I.M. Sechenov First Moscow State Medical University
- Doctoral students: Marina Minina

Sergey Vladimirovich Gauthier (Russian: Сергей Владимирович Готье; born September 23, 1947 in Moscow, Soviet Union) is a Russian surgeon and transplantologist, Academician of the Russian Academy of Sciences (since 2013), Academician of the Russian Academy of Medical Sciences (since 2011), Chief Transplantologist of the Ministry of Healthcare of the Russian Federation, Doctor of Medical Sciences (Dsc).

Since 2008 Director of the V.I. Shumakov National Medical Research Center of Transplantology and Artificial Organs of the Ministry of Healthcare of the Russian Federation.

Also since 2008, he heads the Department of Transplantology and Artificial Organs at the I.M. Sechenov First Moscow State Medical University.

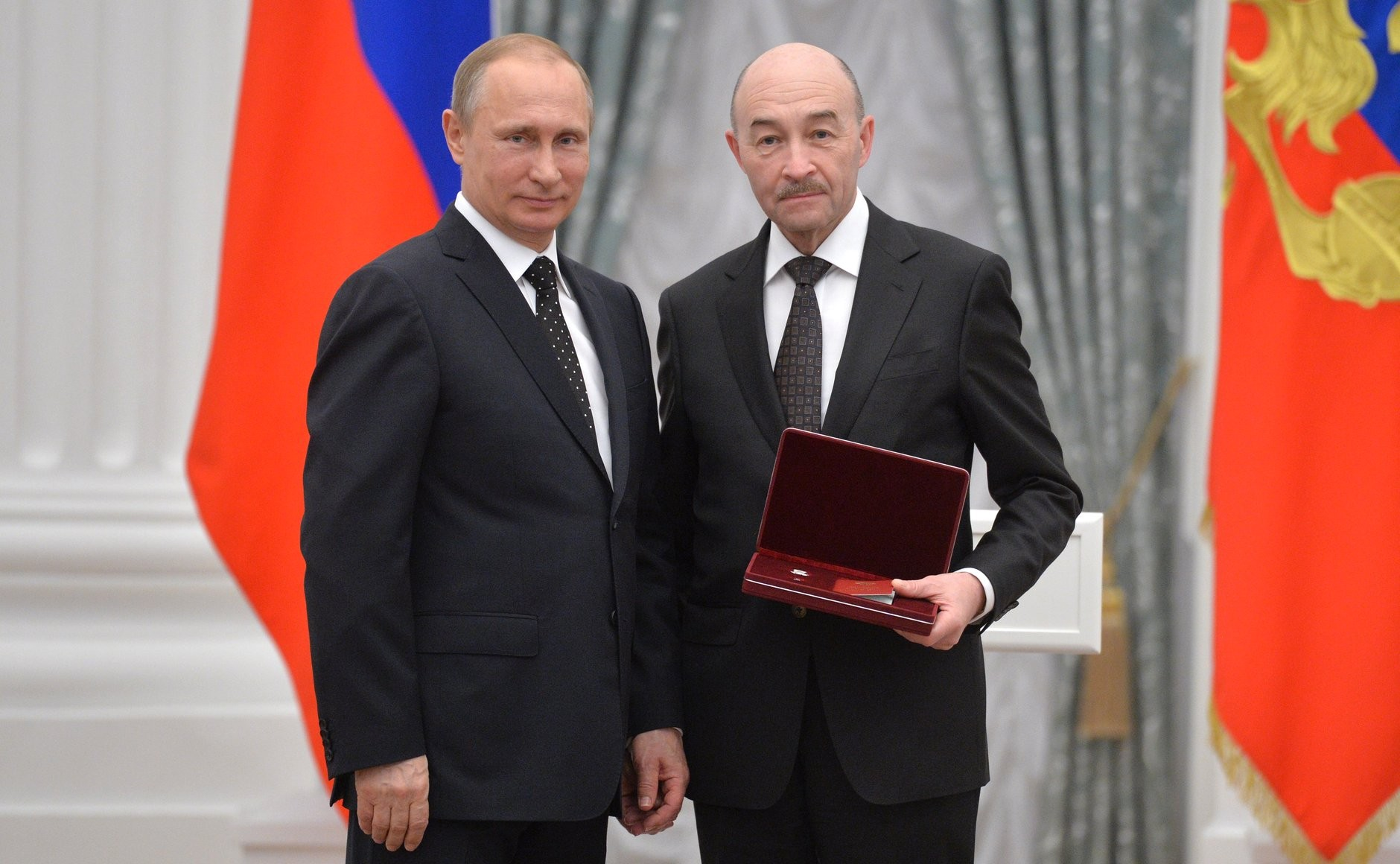
With Vladimir Putin on presentation of Honored physician of the Russian Federation, 21 May 2015

He graduated from the I.M. Sechenov First Moscow State Medical University in 1971, and he defended his Candidate's Dissertation in 1976.

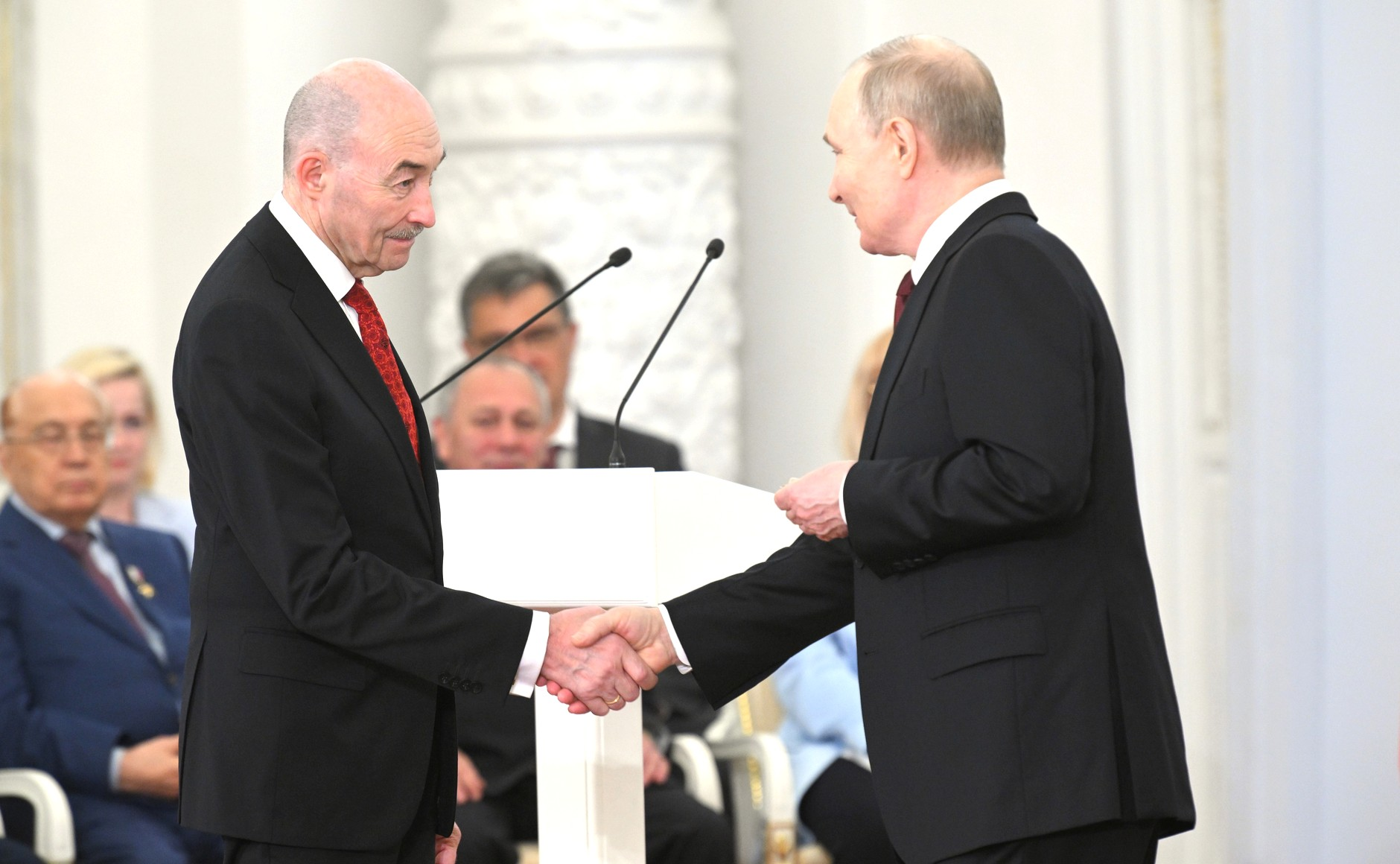
Presentation of the State Prize of the Russian Federation, 12 June 2024

Academician S.V. Gauthier is the author more than 700 scientific works.
