= Mariya Zerova =

Botanist and scientist (1902–1994)

- Марія Яківна Зерова
- Born: Maria Yakivna; April 7, 1902; Koziatyn
- Died: July 21, 1994 (aged 92); Kyiv
- Other names: Marija Jakovlevna Zerova; Mariya Yakivna Zerova; Marija Serowa
- Citizenship: Ukraine
- Spouse: Dmitry Zerov
- Children: Marina Zerovyh
- Scientific career
- Fields: Mycology
- Theses: Pleomorphism of some ascomycetes (1942); Study of the microflora of the USSR and mycorrhiza of the steppe part of Ukraine (1969)
- Author abbrev. (botany): Zerova

Mariya Yakovlevna Zerova, alternately Marija Jakovlevna Zerova, (Ukrainian: Марія Яківна Зерова; April 7, 1902 – July 21, 1994) was a Ukrainian biologist and taxonomist known for her work in mycology.

Her research included work on ectrotrophic mycorrhiza and fungal diseases of the rubber tree (Hevea brasiliensis) and beet (Beta sp). She made a major contribution to the multi-volume books of the Determination of Mushrooms of Ukraine published between 1967 and 1979. Her collection of 12,000 specimens of fungi and plants is now held in the National Herbarium of Ukraine.

== Education ==
In 1917, she left the Mariinsky Women's Gymnasium with a silver medal and entered the Kiev Medical Institute. However, she contracted tuberculosis and left after studying for three years. She then attended Kiev University, studying in the Faculty of Biology within the (then) Institute of Public Education. She graduated in 1924.

In 1942, Zerova defended a dissertation in mycology entitled Pleomorphism of some ascomycetes about the ontogenetic relationships of Ascomycota to the fungi imperfecti. In 1969, she was awarded a higher Doctor of Sciences degree for a thesis on the Study of the microflora of the USSR and mycorrhiza of the steppe part of Ukraine.

== Career ==
After graduating, Zerova worked initially as a school teacher. However, she soon resumed a scientific career and spent her life studying fungal taxonomy, ecology and uses of fungi. After working at the Scientific Research Institute for Sugar Beet, in 1932 she was appointed head of the phytopathology department of the Scientific Research Institute of Rubber and Rubber Products. She studied the microflora and diseases of rubber plants and identified and described four new species of fungi: Macrosporium tausaghyzianum Zerova; Phyllosticta tausaghyziana Zerova; Myrothecium transchelianum Zerova & Tropova and Melanospora asclepiadis Zerova (a mycoparasite of Fusarium solani App. & Wr.).

She moved to an Institute for Forest Plantations and researched plant pathology and also how mycology could improve the establishment of trees and shrubs in landscaped urban areas. She identified over 400 species of fungi, some new to science, on 160 plant species.

In 1942 Zerova joined the MG Kholodny Institute of Botany of the USSR Academy of Sciences and remained there for the rest of her career. In 1963 she became head of the department of mycology, and from 1972 until her death in 1994 was a senior researcher-consultant. Research into mycorrhiza began at the Institute in the 1950s and her research moved into this area. She investigated the diversity of species associated with trees, shrubs and also the grasses and forbs of the Ukraine steppe. The specimens that she collected during this work are now kept in the National Herbarium of Ukraine within the Institute of Botany.

Later, in the 1960s, she worked on fungal classification including of the genera Inocybe and Dacryomstra. She applied the newly available technology of scanning electron microscopy in this research. She led research on increasing the number of fungal species harvested for human food, including developing cultivation methods for more species. These cultivation strategies were considered more important after the realisation that wild fungal fruiting bodies could accumulate heavy metals and radioactive isotopes from the soil. She also initiated research into medicinal properties of some of these species.

During her career she supervised postgraduate students and also gave lectures and seminars to the public as well as scientific conferences.

== Publications ==
Zerova is the author or co-author of over 200 publications. These include books about the fungi of Ukraine.

- M. Ya. Zerova, Edible and poisonous mushrooms of Ukraine (Їстівні та отруйні гриби України) (in Ukrainian, two editions, 1963 and 1970).
- M. Ya. Zerova and SP Wasser, Edible and Poisonous Mushrooms of the Ukrainian Carpathians (Їстівні та отруйні гриби Українських Карпат) (in Ukrainian, 1972).
- M. Ya. Zerova, Atlas of Mushrooms of Ukraine (Атлас грибів України) (in Ukrainian, 1974). With colour drawings of 550 species of mushrooms.

She was one of the authors of the Determination of mushrooms of Ukraine (Визначник грибів України), that was published in five volumes in seven books between 1967 and 1979, although work on it started in 1946. She contributed to Volume 2, on ascomycota and basidiomycota found in the Ukraine region, and also to Volume 3 where she provided a critical revision of the fungi imperfecti.

In the 60's Zerova published generalized works on the classification and evolution of ascomycetes.

== Awards ==
In December 1983 Zerova was awarded the State Prize of Ukraine in Science and Technology in the field of science and technology for her contributions to the Determination of Mushrooms of Ukraine (1967–1979).

== Personal life ==
She met and married Dmitry Zerov while she was a student at Kiev University. They had a child, zoologist Marina Zerova.
