= Marina Simanovskaya =

Russian rapper (1978–2002)

- Also known as: Marusya, Ma.ru.sya, Jungle Girl
- Born: Marina Igorevna Simanovskaya; October 1, 1978; Bazarno-Karabulaksky District, Saratov Oblast, Soviet Union, Russia
- Died: April 4, 2002 (aged 23) Moscow, Russia
- Genres: hip-hop, soul
- Occupations: singer, rapper
- Years active: 1998–2002

Marina Igorevna Simanovskaya (1 October 1978 – 4 April 2002) was a Russian rapper, on the hip-hop scene she was known primarily under the name Marusya.

== Biography and career ==
Marina studied at the conservatory and at the same time was one of the participants in the first female hip-hop group in Russia, White Chocolate. She was also one of the first Russian singers performing rhythmic r’n’b. She performed with Detsl, participated in the recording of two of his hits "Party" and "Letter" and filming videos for them.

All forces were thrown into the fight against the disease, but it did not recede, and the singer slowly and painfully faded away. In the last weeks of her life, she could not walk, her vision and voice disappeared. On April 4, 2002, early in the morning, Marina died from brain cancer. The death of Marina Simanovskaya was a tragedy for Russian hip-hop. Marusya's friends in the group Liya and Lera, after her death, released the group's only album in the same year – Three Symbols.

== Discography ==
As part of the group White Chocolate

- 2002 – Three Symbols (released posthumously)
