= Nina Linta Lazarević =

Serbian theater, film, and television actress, theatrical producer and playwright

Nina Linta Lazarević (Serbian Cyrillic: Нина Линта Лазаревић; aka Nina Lazarević; born on 20 August 1976 in Belgrade, [then part of PR Serbia] in Yugoslavia) is a Serbian theater, film, and television actress, theatrical producer, and playwright.

Linta graduated from Belgrade's Faculty of Drama Arts in 2002 and during her career played many roles in theater.

== Selected filmography ==
- Nije kraj (2008)
- Gorki plodovi (serija) (2008)
- Zvezda Tri (2009)
- Kako su me ukrali Nemci (2011)
- The November Man (2014)
- Non chiedere perchè (alias L'angelo di Sarajevo) (2015)
