= Marina Zerova =

Ukrainian zoologist (1934–2021)

- Born: Marina Dmitrievna Zerova; 29 December 1934; Kyiv, Ukrainian SSR, Soviet Union
- Died: March 9, 2021 (aged 86); Kyiv, Ukraine
- Education: University of Kiev
- Awards: Award of the National Academy of Sciences of Ukraine named after DK Zabolotny 1981; Honored Worker of Science and Technology of Ukraine, 2003
- Scientific career
- Fields: Entomology
- Theses: Hymenoptera (Hymenoptera, Chalcidoidea): morpho-biological features, evolution and classification (1980)
- Author abbrev. (zoology): Zerova

Marina Dmitrievna Zerova (Ukrainian: Марина Дмитрівна Зерова; 29 December 1934 – 9 March 2021) was a Ukrainian entomologist. Several insects have been named after her. She became Doctor of Biological Sciences (1980), Professor (1989) and Honored Worker of Science and Technology of Ukraine (2003). In 1981 she was awarded the Award of the National Academy of Sciences of Ukraine named after DK Zabolotny.

== Career ==
In 1957, she graduated from the Department of Invertebrate Zoology in the Faculty of Biology, University of Kiyv. She had specialised in entomology under the guidance of Olexandr Filippovich Kryshtal. Until 1963, she worked at the Zoological Museum of Kiyv University, after which she entered the graduate school of the Institute of Zoology of the National Academy of Sciences of Ukraine. In 1966, she defended her Ph.D. on research into wasps in the groups Eurytomidae and Harmolitinae. In 1979, she submitted a thesis on Hymenoptera (Hymenoptera, Chalcidoidea): morpho-biological features, evolution and classification for a higher Doctor of Science degree that was awarded the following year.

In 1981, Zerova established a laboratory of entomological taxonomy and ecology in the Institute of Zoology of the National Academy of Sciences of Ukraine. This provided training in identification methods as well as undertaking further research into these groups of parasitic wasps. In 1986, it was made into a separate department, which she headed from 2011.

During her career, she described about 300 new types of wasps from different parts of the world, mainly of the superfamily Chalcidoidea. Some of these descriptions were in monographs in the series Fauna of Ukraine and Fauna of the USSR published in the 1960 and 1970s. She was also the author of Insect Determinant of the European Part of the USSR (vol. 3, part 2, Leningrad, 1978), Insect Determinant of the Far East of Russia (vol. 4, part 2, Vladivostok, 1995) and contributed to the Russian-Ukrainian dictionary of scientific terminology.

Among the genera that she described were Parabruchophagus Zerova, 1992 (Eurytomidae), Tetramesella Zerova, 1974 (Eurytomidae) and Elatomorpha Zerova, 1970 (Perilampidae).

Further insects have been named after her including the genus Zerovella Narendran and Sheela, 1994 and the species Aprostocetus zerovae Kostjukov and Fursov, 1987, Eocencyrtus zerovae Simutnik, 2001, Entedon zerovae Gumovsky, 1995, Eurytoma zerovai Ozdikmen, 2011, Idiomacromerus zerovaae Doganlar, 2016, Neruandella zerovae Trjapitzin and Ruiz Cancino, 2001, Tetramesa zerovae Narendran, 1994.

== Personal life ==
Her parents were the scientists mycologist Mariya Yakovlevna Zerova and botanist Dmytro Zerov.
