= Marina Granovskaia =

Russian-Canadian executive and former Chelsea F.C. director

Marina Vladimirovna Granovskaia (Russian: Марина Владимировна Грановская; born 13 January 1975) is a Russian-Canadian business executive who served as a director at Chelsea from 2014 to 2022. She was also chief assistant to Roman Abramovich for more than ten years.

== Professional career ==
Granovskaia studied at the Foreign Languages Faculty of Moscow State University and graduated in 1997. She started working as Roman Abramovich's PA at Sibneft in 1997. In 2003, she moved to London, when Abramovich bought Chelsea. She has also worked for Millhouse Capital, another company owned by Abramovich.

=== Chelsea F.C. ===
Granovskaia became involved in transfers and contractual dealings for Chelsea, becoming the representative of the owner at the club in 2010, then joining the Chelsea board in June 2013. In 2014, she was promoted to chief executive of the club. The Times stated that the promotion made her the "most powerful woman in football."

Her task of managing transfers sometimes put her at odds with managers who had their own ideas of whom to sell or buy during the transfer window. She has also been responsible for brokering the team's sponsorship deal with Nike, that will fund £60m per year to the club until 2032.

Granovskaia has been described as 'The Iron Lady' and "one of the best club directors in world football". In 2018, Forbes ranked her Number 5 in their "Most Powerful Women in International Sports" list.

Marina Granovskaia received the Best Club Director in European football award at the Golden Boy Awards on 13 December 2021. On 22 June 2022, it was announced that Granovskaia would leave Chelsea by the end of the 2021–22 season, following the change in ownership of the club.
