= Marina Logares =

Spanish mathematician and activist

Marina Logares Jiménez
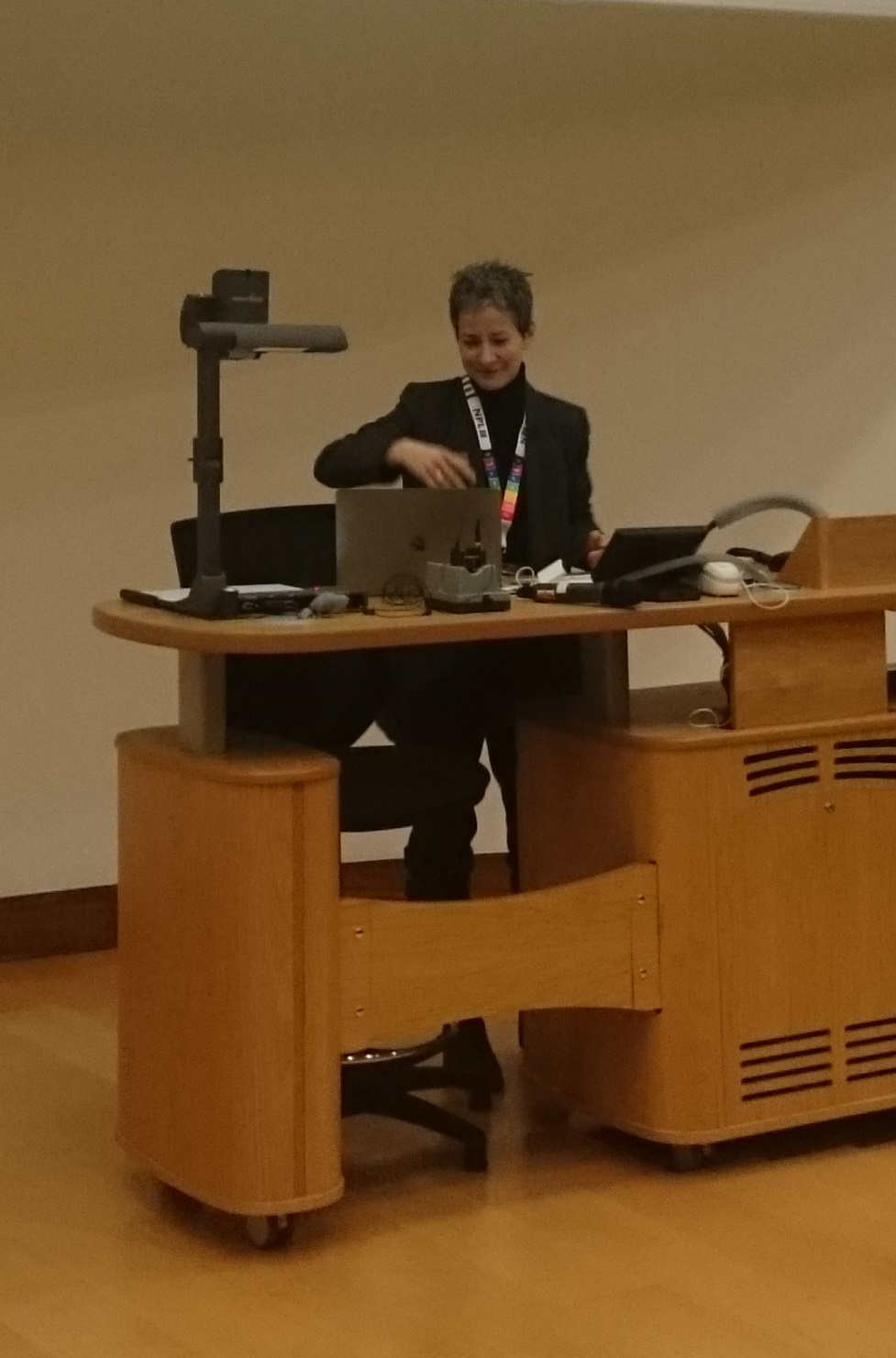
- Marina Logares presenting at the LGBT STEMinar in January 2020
- Born: 1976 (age 49–50)
- Education: Autonomous University of Madrid
- Scientific career
- Workplaces: Complutense University of Madrid
- Thesis: Parabolic U(p;q)-Higgs bundles (2006)

Marina Logares Jiménez (born 1976, in Madrid) is a Spanish mathematician and LGBT+ activist. She was named one of the 50 most influential LGBT+ people in Spain in 2019.

== Career ==
Logares was awarded her PhD in mathematics in 2006 from the Autonomous University of Madrid. She later worked at the Max Planck Institute in Bonn, the University of Oxford, the University of Porto and the University of Plymouth. She is currently a visiting professor at the Complutense University of Madrid. Logares studies within the field of geometry. Her areas of interest in research focus on algebraic and complex geometry and mathematical physics. She particularly studies Yang–Mills equations, and their derivatives, Hitchin equations.

In 2018 she published the book Las geometrías y otras revoluciones (Geometry and other revolutions), which describes the history of the field of geometry.

== Activism ==
Logares is notable for her social engagement, particularly her participation in the struggle for the LGBT community's rights and inclusion in science. She is a lesbian. At the university of Plymouth, Logares was the co-chair of the LGBT co-forum. In 2019 she was included in a list of the 50 most influential LGBT people in Spain by newspaper El Mundo. In 2020 she was the keynote speaker the LGBT STEMinar in Birmingham, UK.

== Personal life ==
Logares is a 3rd degree black belt in Taekwondo and black belt in Hapkido.

== Articles ==
Some of her publications are:

- Paper 'Moduli Spaces of Framed G–Higgs Bundles and Symplectic Geometry'. With Indranil Biswas and Ana Peón Nieto. July 2019.
- Paper 'On Higgs Bundles on Nodal Curves'. March 2019.
- Book 'Las matemáticas y otras revoluciones'. Colección ¿Qué sabemos de? del CSIC y Catarata, 2018.
- Paper 'A lax monoidal Topological Quantum Field Theory for representation varieties'. With Ángel González-Prieto. September 2017.
- Paper 'Bohr--Sommerfeld Lagrangians of moduli spaces of Higgs bundles'. With Indranil Biswas and Niels Leth Gammelgaard. September 2014.
- Hodge-Deligne polynomials of SL(2,C)-character varieties for curves of small genus'. With Vicente Muñoz y Peter E. Newstead. June 2011.
- Artículo 'A Torelli theorem for the moduli space of parabolic Higgs bundles'. Con Tomás L. Gómez. Mayo 2009.
- Thesis 'Parabolic U(p;q)Higgs bundles'. May 2006.
