= Marina Medvetskaya =

Georgian prima ballerina

- Occupation(s): ballet dancer, artistic director, choreographer

Marina Medvetskaya is a Georgian prima ballerina. She danced with the Tbilisi State Academic Opera and Ballet Theatre, in Tbilisi, Georgia. She was a student of the legendary ballet dancer Vakhtang Chabukiani. She is currently the artistic director of the St. Petersburg Classic Ballet Theatre

== Career ==
Medvetskaya is the artistic director of the St. Petersburg Classic Ballet Theatre in St. Petersburg, Russia Her company has performed in the Soviet Union, Europe, and over 50 countries. The company was awarded the gold medal in the "Amber Necklace" International Ballet competition in Kaliningrad, Russia.
