= Vyacheslav Petrukhin =

Russian footballer

Personal information
- Full name: Vyacheslav Nikolayevich Petrukhin
- Date of birth: December 29, 1953 (age 72)
- Positions: Defender; midfielder

Team information
- Current team: FC Torpedo-ZIL Moscow (director)

Senior career*
Years	Team	Apps	(Gls)
1971	FC Torpedo Moscow (reserves)	?	(1)
1973–1974	FC Torpedo Moscow	2	(0)
1975–1977	FC Nistru Chişinău	109	(0)
1978–1980	FC Dnipro Dnipropetrovsk	74	(0)
1980	FC Lokomotiv Moscow	6	(0)
1981	FC Nistru Chişinău	27	(0)
1987	FC Geolog Tyumen	32	(0)
1988–1989	FC Metallurg Magnitogorsk	38	(0)

Managerial career
- 2004–2005: FC Oryol (VP)
- 2005: FC Oryol (director)
- 2008: FC Torpedo Moscow (director of sports)
- 2009–: FC Torpedo-ZIL Moscow (director)
- * Club domestic league appearances and goals

Vyacheslav Nikolayevich Petrukhin (Russian: Вячеслав Николаевич Петрухин; born 29 December 1953) is a retired Russian professional football player. Currently, he works as a director for FC Torpedo-ZIL Moscow.
