= Marina Sysoyeva =

Soviet-Kyrgyz high jumper

Personal information
- Native name: Марина Сысоева
- Full name: Marina Sysoyeva
- Nationality: Indonesian
- Born: 6 March 1959 Frunze, Kirghiz SSR

Sport
- Sport: Athletics
- Event: High jump

Marina Sysoyeva (Russian: Марина Сысоева; born 3 June 1959) is a Kyrgyz retired high jumper. As a junior, Sysoyeva would compete at the 1977 European Athletics Junior Championships but would not medal in the women's high jump. Later on, she would compete at the Brothers Znamensky Memorial and set a personal best in the event with a height of 1.93 metres.

Two weeks after the competition, she would compete at the 1980 Summer Olympics, representing the Soviet Union in the women's high jump. She would place joint first in the qualifying round and would advance to the finals. In the finals, she would place fifth out of the eleven competitors that competed in the finals.

== Biography ==
Marina Sysoyeva was born on 3 June 1959 in Frunze (now Bishkek) in what was then the Kirghiz SSR. As a junior, Sysoyeva would compete at the 1977 European Athletics Junior Championships, which were held in Donetsk. There, she would compete in the women's high jump on 19 August, recording a height of 1.77 metres but did not medal in the event. Two years later, she would improve her mark with a height of 1.91 metres set at a competition in Minsk.

She would then compete at the Brothers Znamensky Memorial held in Moscow. There, she would set her personal best in the event with a height of 1.93 metres. Two weeks later, she would compete at the 1980 Summer Olympics held in Moscow, representing the Soviet Union in athletics. There, she would first compete in the qualification round "Group A" of the women's high jump on 25 July against twelve other competitors. She would place joint first in the event with a height of 1.88 metres, advancing to the finals. At the finals held the next day, she would compete against eleven other competitors. She would clear heights of 1.80 metres, 1.85 metres, and 1.88 metres, all on her first attempt at each height. Sysoyeva would then fail her first attempt at 1.91 metres but would clear it on her second. She proceeded to fail three attempts at a height of 1.94 metres and eventually placed fifth overall in the competition.
