= Marina de Guevara =

Spanish nun

Marina de Guevara (1517 – 8 October 1559), was a Spanish nun. Accused of being a Lutheran by the Spanish Inquisition, she was executed in the auto da fe in Valladolid on 8 October 1559.
