= Marina Keegan =

American author & playwright (1989–2012)

- Born: Marina Evelyn Keegan; October 25, 1989; Boston, Massachusetts, U.S.
- Died: May 26, 2012 (aged 22); Cape Cod, Massachusetts, U.S.
- Education: Yale University
- Occupation: Writer

Marina Evelyn Keegan (October 25, 1989 – May 26, 2012) was an American author, playwright, and journalist. She is best known for her essay "The Opposite of Loneliness," which went viral and was viewed over 1.4 million times in 98 countries after her death in a car crash while traveling home as a passenger just five days after she graduated magna cum laude from Yale University.

== Biography ==
Keegan was born in Boston and raised in the suburb of Wayland, Massachusetts. She attended Buckingham Browne & Nichols in Cambridge before matriculating to Yale in the fall of 2008. At Yale, Keegan majored in English and served as president of the Yale College Democrats during her junior year. She was to begin a job at The New Yorker following her graduation from Yale.

== The Opposite of Loneliness ==
A collection of Keegan's works, both fiction and non-fiction, was published posthumously by Scribner in April 2014. The book is titled after her graduation essay and features an introduction by the American author Anne Fadiman, who was one of Keegan's professors at Yale. The Opposite of Loneliness was well received and quickly became a New York Times bestseller. The New York Times columnist Nicholas Kristof dedicated a column to the book, hailing it "a triumph" and urging readers to reflect on what they really want from life. Positive reviews also appeared in the Chicago Tribune, the Boston Globe, and the Financial Times, among many others.

== Other works ==
=== "Even Artichokes Have Doubts" ===
On September 30, 2011, Keegan published an essay in the Yale Daily News entitled "Even Artichokes Have Doubts," lamenting the high percentage of graduates who enter into the fields of finance and consulting. The piece captured the attention of author Kevin Roose, who worked for the New York Times’ financial website DealBook at the time. Roose contacted Keegan and asked her to adapt her essay for DealBook, which published her piece as "Another View: The Science and Strategy of College Recruiting," on November 9, 2011. Roose reports that it was DealBook’s "best-performing post in months." He went on to feature Keegan in his book Young Money: Inside the Hidden World of Wall Street’s Post-Crash Recruits (2014), and dedicated it to her memory. Keegan also appeared on National Public Radio's All Things Considered to discuss the piece.

=== "Why We Care About Whales" ===
In September, 2009, Keegan published an essay in the Yale Daily News entitled "Why We Care About Whales," which considers the inconsistencies of empathy. The essay has been anthologized in The Broadview Anthology of Expository Prose.

=== Independents ===
The musical Independents, for which Keegan had written the book, debuted at the New York International Fringe Festival in August 2012. Andy Webster noted the work’s blend of humor and poignancy, describing it as a tribute to “the vitality, vulnerability and bonhomie of young people.” It was one of twelve works - out of nearly two hundred - that was selected for an encore series in September.

=== Utility Monster ===
Keegan's play Utility Monster premiered at the Wellfleet Harbor Actors' Theater on Cape Cod on May 25, 2013. The play follows two fifteen-year-olds struggling with ideas of privilege and social responsibility.

=== "Cold Pastoral" ===
This short story was published by the New Yorker on September 27, 2012. It also appears in the book The Opposite of Loneliness.

=== "Reading Aloud" ===
"Reading Aloud" was read by Rita Wolf on NPR's Selected Shorts program on September 11, 2011.
