= Marina Salamon =

Italian entrepreneur (born 1958)

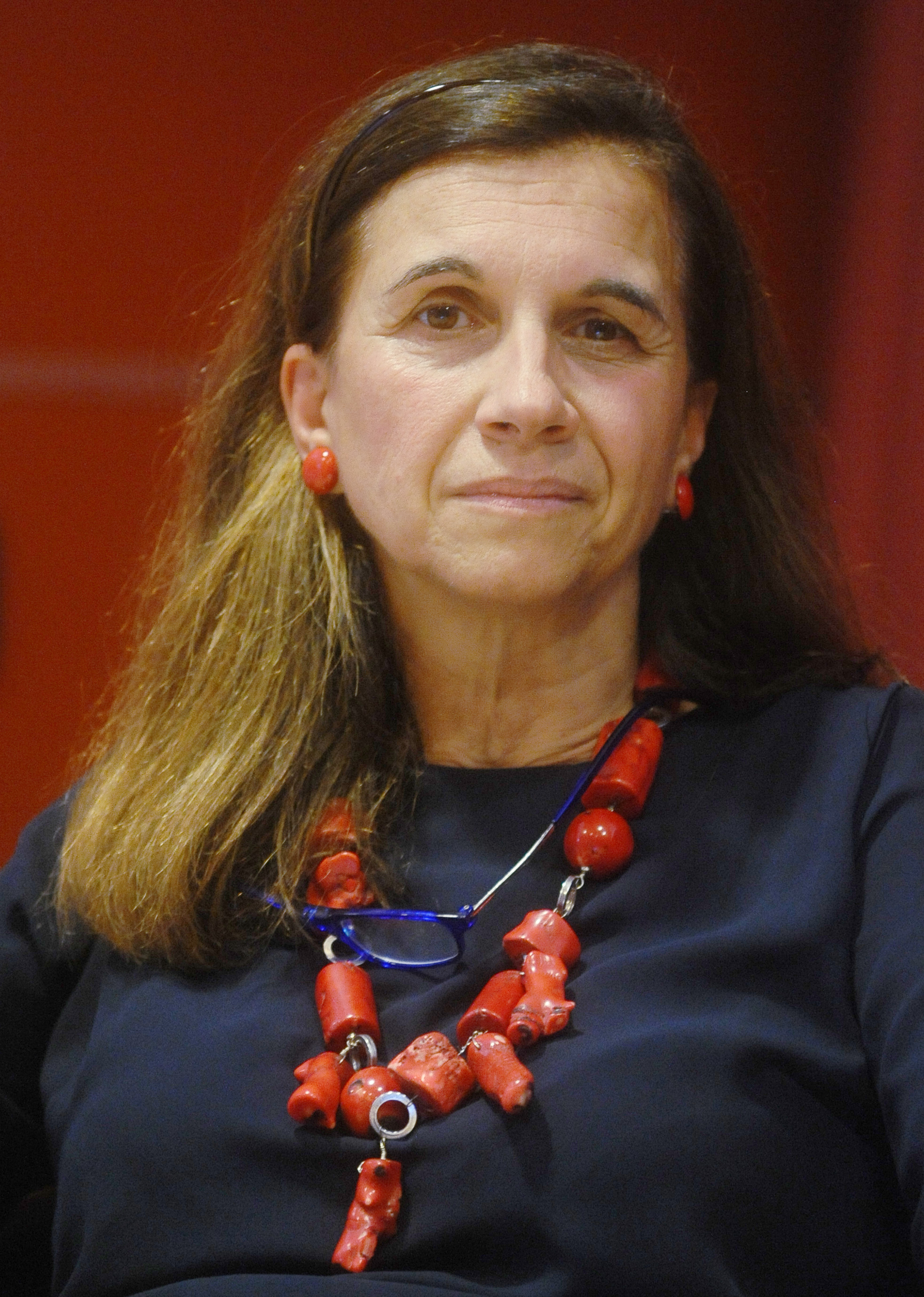
- Born: 3 September 1958 (age 67); Tradate
- Education: Ca' Foscari University of Venice
- Occupation: businesswoman

Marina Salamon (born 3 September 1958) is an Italian entrepreneur.

== Biography ==
At only seventeen years old, Salamon became the partner of entrepreneur Luciano Benetton, and they remained together until 1993. Towards the end of their relationship, their son Brando was born. Although Brando is officially recognized by his father, he grew up with his mother and her new partner, Marco Benatti, an advertising manager whom Salamon married in 1998. With Benatti, she has three children, and for a few years, she also had two teenage girls in temporary foster care.

She has a degree in history from Ca' Foscari University of Venice.

At twenty-three, thanks to the financial support of Luciano Benetton, Salamon established the company Altana, specializing in the production of garments. As president and majority shareholder of the company, she grew Altana by acquiring other companies, making it known at the European level. The company managed various brands, including Moschino, Liu Jo, Jeckerson, and, for several years, Moncler.

As proprietor and sole administrator of the Alchimia holding company, Salamon acquired control of Doxa in 1992 from the heirs of the founder Pierpaolo Luzzatto Fegiz. Ennio Salamon, had been the president and managing director of Doxa for many years. Salamon came to hold 90% of the shares. In 2006, she assumed the role of managing director of Doxa, and in 2012, she also became president after dismissing her father. In 2006, together with Emma Marcegaglia, she founded Arendi, a company that produced photovoltaic plants; the company has since closed.

Salamon has also had experiences in politics. Always close to the positions of Communion and Liberation, she has moved several times between center-right and center-left. In 1994, she was a candidate on the Democratic Alliance list, which she later left. In the same year, she joined the council of the comune of Venice as a spokesperson for Mayor Massimo Cacciari, but she was removed from office after a few months. Later, she was a promoter of Fare di Oscar Giannino. Salamon has been the international councilor of the WWF for over ten years, with responsibilities for the management of assets, personnel, finance, and budgeting.

In 2013, her book Dai vita ai tuoi sogni was published by Mondadori.

For her work as an entrepreneur and manager, Salamon received the Premio Marisa Bellisario in 1992.
