= Marina Iliopoulou =

Greek mathematician

Marina Iliopoulou (Greek: Μαρίνα Ηλιοπούλου) is a Greek mathematician. Her main research focus is harmonic analysis, but she has also published research in discrete geometry including new results on the Erdős–Anning theorem. She is a professor of mathematics at the National and Kapodistrian University of Athens.

== Education and career ==
Iliopoulou did her undergraduate studies in mathematics at the National and Kapodistrian University of Athens, finishing in 2009. She received a Ph.D. in 2013 from the University of Edinburgh in Scotland, with the dissertation Discrete analogues of Kakeya problems supervised by Tony Carbery.

After postdoctoral research at the University of Birmingham in England and the Mathematical Sciences Research Institute and University of California, Berkeley in the US, she became an assistant professor at the University of Kent in England in 2019. In 2022 she took an associate professorship at the University of Birmingham, and in 2023 she returned to the University of Athens as a full professor.

== Recognition ==
Iliopoulou is one of three recipients of the 2024 L'Oréal-UNESCO Greek Awards for Women in Science.
