= Marina Guenza =

Italian chemist

Marina Guenza is an Italian theoretical physical chemist who studies the fluid dynamics of macromolecules. She is a professor of chemistry and biochemistry at the University of Oregon.

== Education and career ==
Guenza earned a master's degree at the University of Genoa in 1985, and completed her Ph.D. in 1989 through a consortium of the University of Genoa, University of Turin, and University of Pavia.

Formerly a tenured researcher for the National Research Council (Italy), she moved to the University of Oregon as an assistant professor in 2002, earned tenure as an associate professor in 2006, and became full professor in 2012.

== Recognition ==
In 2011, Guenza was named a Fellow of the American Physical Society (APS), after a nomination from the APS Division of Polymer Physics, "for significant contributions to the field of polymer physics through the development of theoretical methods to study macromolecular structure and dynamics". She became a Fellow of the American Association for the Advancement of Science in 2018.
