= Marina Fedorova =

Marina Fedorova may refer to:

- Marina Fedorova (artist) (born 1981), Russian figurative artist and painter
- Marina Fedorova (footballer) (born 1997), Russian footballer
