= Marina Romanò =

Italian politician (born 1960)

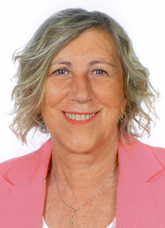

Member of the Chamber of Deputies
- In office 30 May 2022 – 13 October 2022

Mayor of Cesano Maderno
- In office 23 June 2009 – 27 June 2011

Personal details
- Born: 30 September 1960 (age 65) Cesano Maderno, Lombardy, Italy
- Party: Lega
- Profession: Employee

Marina Romanò (born 30 September 1960) is an Italian politician who served as Mayor of Cesano Maderno from 2009 to 2011 and as Deputy from 30 May 2022 to 13 October 2022.

== Life ==
Municipal councillor for the Northern League in Cesano Maderno from 1995 to 2009, Romanò served as mayor from 2009 (she was elected in the first round with 50.7% of the vote at the head of a centre-right coalition) until 2011, when the councillorship ended following the resignation of the majority of municipal councillors. Re-elected in the following year's elections and supported by the Northern League, she obtained 13.37% in the first round against the 56.53% of the centre-left candidate Pietro Luigi Ponti, and was thus re-elected to the City Council, to be re-elected in 2017 and 2022.

In 2006 she was appointed assessor for the Environment, Security and Civil Protection of the municipality of Desio, remaining in office until 2011, while from 2020 to 2021 she was assessor for Labour and Productive Activities of the municipality of Seveso.

In the 2019 local elections she was elected councillor for the province of Monza and Brianza, and was reappointed in 2021.

Candidated for the League for the Chamber of Deputies in the Lombardy 1 constituency in the 2018 elections, she was the first of the unelected behind Massimiliano Capitanio at the proportional level. Following Capitanio's resignation once he became AgCom commissioner, Romanò succeeded him as deputy on 30 May 2022.
