= Marina Niyazgulova =

Russian chess player (born 1995)

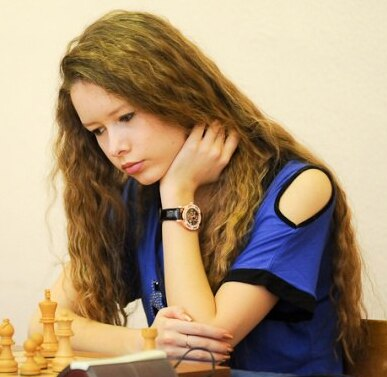

Personal information
- Full name: Marina Sergeevna Niyazgulova
- Born: Marina Barieva; 21 August 1995 (age 30) Chelyabinsk, Russia

Chess career
- Country: Russia
- Title: Woman International Master (2011)
- FIDE rating: 2227 (August 2018)
- Peak rating: 2239 (March 2018)

Marina Niyazgulova (Russian: Марина Ниязгулова; born August 21, 1995) is a Russian chess player who holds the title of Woman International Master and Master of Sports of Russia.

== Early life and education ==
Niyazgulova was born in Chelyabinsk, Russia, on August 21, 1995. She started playing at a chess club at the age of 6 under the mentorship of Russian GM Aleksandr Potapov. At the age of 7 she continued her studies at chess school "Vaskhod" with coach Abkadyrov Lutfulovich.

== Career ==
Niyazgulova earned her Woman FIDE Master in 2007 and Woman International Master title in 2011. She holds the sports title of Master of Sports of Russia.

Her peak rating was 2239 in April 2018. Her peak ranking was #41 on FIDE Top 100 Girls in February, 2015.

=== Individual competitions ===
Niyazgulova won her first individual major tournament at the European Individual rapid Youth championship for Girls U-16 in Subotica, Serbia, in 2010.

In 2015, Niyazgulova came in first at the Championship of the Krasnodar Territory among Women. Her twin sister, Irina Baraeva, scored a point less and came in second.

She participated in two iterations of the Blitz Chess Championship of the Southern Federal District Among Women in 2016 and 2017. She came in at third and second places, respectively.

She came in third at the Chess Championship of the Southern Federal District Among Women in 2017.

=== Team competitions ===
Niyazgulova took second place at the European Team Youth rapid championship U — 14 in Subotica, Serbia, in 2009. With 12 points, her team trailed only 1 point behind the tournament's team winner Hungary.

Her first major tournament win was at the European youth team championship U18 for Girls in Pardubice, Czech Republic, in 2012. Her team came in first with 13 points out of 9 competing national teams.

In 2015, she participated in the Russian Women's Team Blitz Championship held in Sochi, Russia. Her team, which was representing city of Belorechensk, came in third out of 7 competing teams.

== Personal life ==
Niyazgulova has a twin sister, Irina Baraeva, who is also a professional chess player and a Woman International Master.
