= Marina Orlova =

Marina Orlova may refer to:

- Marina Orlova (actress) (born 1986), Russian actress
- Marina Orlova (YouTuber) (born 1980), Russian internet celebrity with the show on YouTube, HotForWords

== See also ==
- Orlova (disambiguation)
