= Marina Serkova =

Soviet high jumper

Personal information
- Nationality: Soviet
- Born: 12 September 1961 (age 64) Leningrad, Soviet Union

Sport
- Sport: Athletics
- Event: High jump

Marina Serkova (born 12 September 1961) is a Soviet athlete. She competed in the women's high jump at the 1980 Summer Olympics.
