= Valentina Pellizzer =

Valentina Hvale Pellizzer is a sexual rights human rights activist and feminist internet writer. She facilitated seminars, conferences and workshops on ICT, technology, digital storytelling, citizen journalism, digital security and privacy throughout the world. She is known for connecting women's rights, sexual rights, the internet politically and practically and as an advocate for a feminist internet in Bosnia and Herzegovina and wider. She is also known for having founded the alternative feminist portal zenskaposla.ba in Bosnia and Herzegovina.

== Personal ==
She was born and raised in Italy. She completed her BA in Faculty of Law at the University of Messina in Italy. Pelizzer lives and works in Sarajevo as of 1999.

== Work ==
Pellizzer left Italy in 1994 and started humanitarian work and provision of aid and support for refugees and victims of war in Croatia and Bosnia and Herzegovina. She is interested in Western Balkan political, civil society environment and Women's Rights Movement from within BiH and wider. In 2003 she founded non-profit organisation One World Platform for Southeast Europe, on women's human rights, internet rights and transformative power of technology. From 2006 to 2016, she was the global coordinator for the Bosnia and Herzegovina Take Back the Tech! campaign on raising awareness of how ICTs are connected to violence against women, the firstsuch campaign in Bosnia and Herzegovina. From 2010 to 2013 she was one of the tutors and lecturers at “Žarana Papić” school, organised by “Zene Zenama”. In 2014 together with One World Platform she organised and led the first ICT training in Balkans region on violence against women, privacy and on-line security Women Rock IT. In 2015, under the leadership of Pellizzer, One World Platform co-organized the first Internet Governance forum event in BiH.

During 2014 Unrest in Bosnia and Herzegovina, she was active member of Plenum of citizens for which she stated:

What happened with the plenums in February was a miracle not only for Bosnia and Herzegovina, but – in a sense – for the whole world. This has been, as evidence shows, the only revolt that never resulted in violence, never became a Tahrir Square or Maidan. It showed a way to go for those who believe in non-violence even in the twenty-first century.

As feminist internet writer, Pellizzer's work has appeared in: East Journal, Regional Cooperation Council, Gender.it. Since 2007 to 2017, she has been a regular contributor for Global Information Society Watch, and is also a supporting author of Handbook on Securing Online and Offline Freedoms for Women.
