= Marina Butovskaya =

Russian ethologist and cultural anthropologist

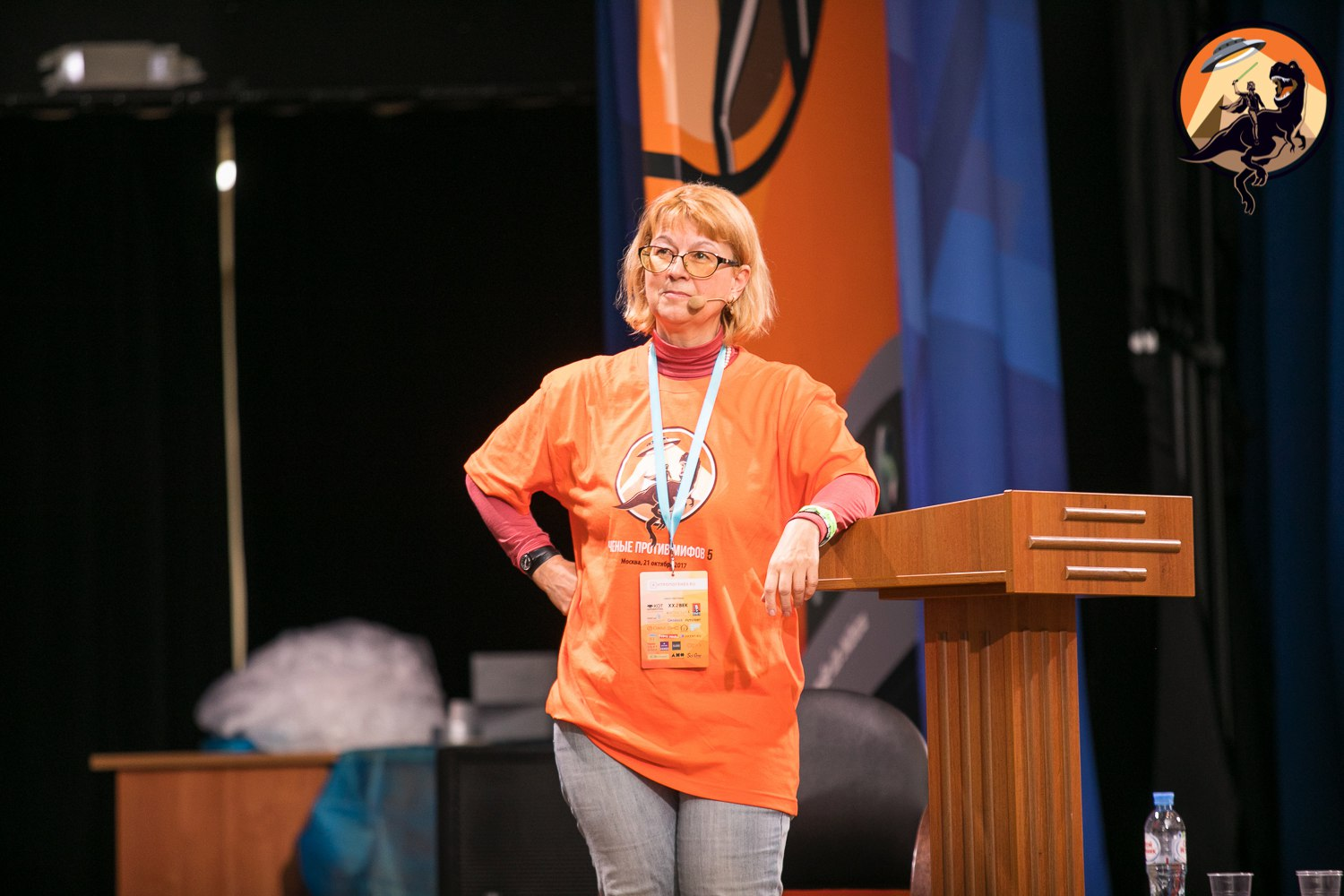
- Butovskaya in 2017
- Born: 27 June 1959 (age 67); Cherkassy, Ukrainian SSR, Soviet Union

Academic background
- Education: Moscow State University (1982)

Academic work
- Discipline: Ethology

Marina Butovskaya (Russian: Марина Львовна Бутовская; born 27 June 1959) is a Russian ethologist and cultural anthropologist.

== Life ==
She was born in the Soviet Union in the city of Cherkassy (present-day Ukraine), she earned a Master of Arts degree from Moscow State University in 1982. She was awarded a Doctor of Philosophy degree by the Soviet Academy of Sciences in 1986, and a Doctor of Science degree by the Russian Academy of Sciences in 1994.

At the beginning of her career, Butovskaya undertook a study of the social ecology of non-human primates, as well as studies of children's social behavior. This work brought her widespread recognition.

In the 1990s, Butovskaya undertook comparative field research across two cultural groups: Kalmyk people and Russian people, working in the areas around Moscow, in the Tula region, Elista, and the village of Iki-Chinos in Kalmykia. Her study examined how children were socialized with respect to aggressive and peacemaking behavior, by studying interactions between children at play outdoors. She stated based on her research that children were able to cope with conflict among adults by the age of 6–7.

Butovskaya later began studying the anthropology of beggars in urban Russia, and eventually to a cross-cultural study of begging in Moscow, Prague, and Budapest. She is also studying the movement of urban pedestrians.
