= Marina Ruggles-Wrenn =

American aerospace and mechanical engineer

Marina B. Ruggles-Wrenn is an American aerospace and mechanical engineer known for her research on advanced materials for extreme environments in aerospace applications. She is a professor of aerospace engineering in the Department of Aeronautics and Astronautics at the Air Force Institute of Technology (AFIT).

== Education and career ==
Ruggles-Wrenn graduated from Polytechnic Institute of New York in 1981 with a bachelor of science in mechanical engineering. In 1983 she attended Rensselaer Polytechnic Institute where she acquired her master's, and completed her Ph.D. in 1987.

From 1987-2003, Ruggles-Wrenn worked as a researcher at the Oak Ridge National Laboratory. In 2003, she joined the Air Force Institute of Technology faculty (AFIT) carrying the title of Associate Professor of Aerospace Engineering and would later be promoted to Professor of Aerospace Engineering in 2009. From 2023-present, she's continued her teachings at AFIT as a Distinguished Professor of Aerospace Engineering in the Department of Aeronautics and Astronautics.

== Recognition ==
Ruggles-Wrenn was named an ASME Fellow in 2003. In 2014 the National Aeronautic Association gave her their Katherine and Marjorie Stinson Trophy, "for dedicating over 27 years of her professional life to advancing the state-of-the-art in aerospace structures, design, and materials".
