= Marina Karyagina =

Chuvash poet, novelist and playwright, TV journalist, documentary director and editor

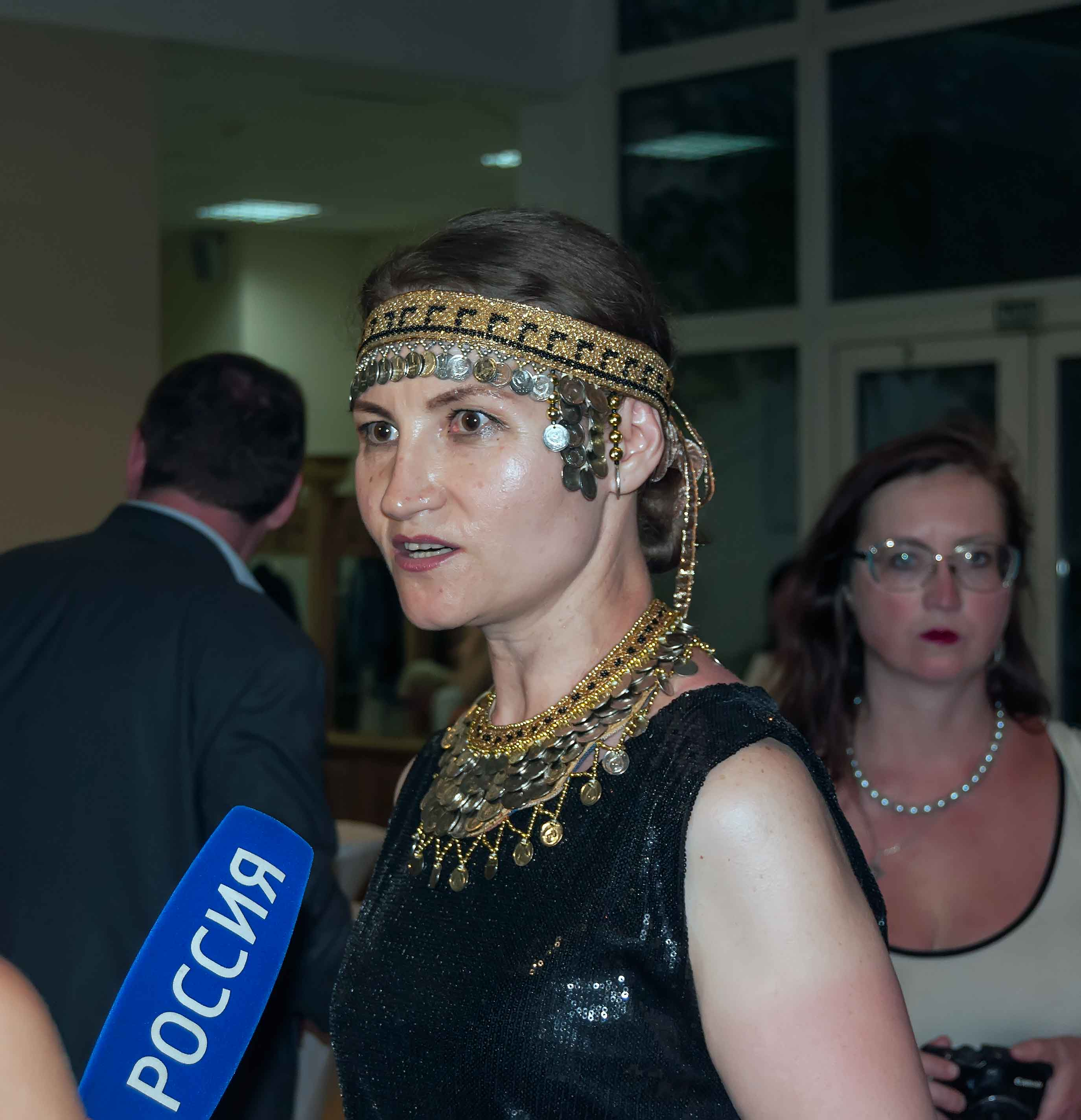
- Born: Marina Karyagina; October 27, 1969 (age 56); Staroe Akhperdino village, Batyrevsky District, Russia, Chuvash ASSR, RSFSR
- Occupations: Poet, novelist and playwright, TV journalist, documentary Director, editor
- Writing career
- Language: Chuvash

Marina Karyagina (born October 16, 1969, Staroe Akhperdino, Batyrevsky District, Chuvash ASSR, RSFSR) is a Chuvash poet, novelist and playwright, TV journalist, documentary director, and editor.

She is a member of the Union of writers of the Russian Federation (1996), member of the Union of journalists of the Russian Federation (1997), member of the Union of cinematographers of the Chuvash Republic (2019)

Winner of the State youth award of the Chuvash Republic in the field of literature, culture and art (1997); winner of the State prize of the Chuvash Republic in the field of literature and art (2013), winner of the Mitta award (2005), winner of the S. A. Elger (2007), winner Of the V. Nikolaev prize (2011), winner of the M. Sespel prize (2020). Winner of the National competition of theatrical art "Чĕнтĕрлĕ чаршав" (Patterned curtain, 2010); awarded the silver medal of the all-Russian literary festival (2017).

== Biography ==
Born on October 16, 1969, in the village of Staroe Akhperdino, Batyrevsky district, Chuvash ASSR. In 1992, she graduated from the faculty of Chuvash Philology and culture of the Chuvash state University named After I. N. Ulyanov. Since then, she has been working for the Chuvash state TV and radio company as a correspondent, editor, presenter and author of the program "Resurrection".

== Literature ==
- Карягина, М. Марина Карягина: «Пĕрех хамшӑн шӑпӑрт мар шӑпа!» : [сӑвӑҫран илнĕ интервью] / М. Карягина; калаҫаканĕ Р. Прокопьева // Хыпар. — 1996. — 23 чӳк. — С. 3.
- Карягина, М. Ф. Марина Карягина: «Тӗнче сӑнне илсе хам витӗр кӑларап…» : [сӑвӑҫран илнӗ интервью] / М. Карягина; [калаҫаканӗ] Р. Прокопьева // Самант. — 2008. — No. 10. — С. 12–13.
- Карягина, М. Ф. Марина Карягина: «Хамри чӑвашлӑха — хамри тӗнчене ӑнланассишӗн ҫыратӑп…» : [М. Карягина сӑвӑҫран илнӗ интервью] / калаҫаканӗ А. Юрату // Хыпар. — 2006. — 27 кӑрлач. — С. # Станьял, В. П. Кĕпе пек хӗрӗ, хӗвеллӗ, тӗллевӗ хӗрӗх, кӗлли пиллӗк : [М. Карягинӑн «Юрӑсӑр уй» кӗнекине хаклани] / В. Станьял // Хыпар. — 2009. — 17 юпа. — С. 11. — (Культура : хушма кӑларӑм / кӑларӑма Н. Смирнова хатӗрленӗ).
- Творчество поэтов-билингвов Чувашии : (о поэзии Г. Айги, Р. Сарби, М. Карягиной, С. Азамат) : учеб. пособие / М-во образования и науки Рос. Федерации, Федер. агентство по образованию, Чуваш. гос. пед. ун-т им. И. Я. Яковлева; [сост. А. Н. Николаева; науч. ред. Д. В. Абшева]. — Чебоксары : ЧГПУ, 2009. — 119 с. — Библиогр. в подстроч. примеч.
- Карягина Марина Фёдоровна // Ялгир, П. Литературный мир Чувашии : справочное издание. — Чебоксары, 2005. — С. 48.
- Карягина (Степанова) Марина Фёдоровна // Батыревская энциклопедия / сост. И. М. Матрасов, С. А. Карягин, А. И. Мефодьев. — Чебоксары, 2005. — С. 95. : ил.
- Родионов, В. Г. Карягина Марина Фёдоровна (Степанова) / В. Г. Родионов // Чувашская энциклопедия : В 4 т. — Чебоксары, 2008. — Т. 2 : Ж-Л. — С. 232. : ил.
- Хузангай, А. П. Соло-голос : биография отдельного лица / А. П. Хузангай // Лик. — 2005. — No. 2. — С. 43–44.
