= Moscow Botkin Multidisciplinary Scientific-Clinical Center =

Moscow Botkin Multidisciplinary Scientific and Clinical Center Московский многопрофильный научно-клинический центр имени С. П. Боткина
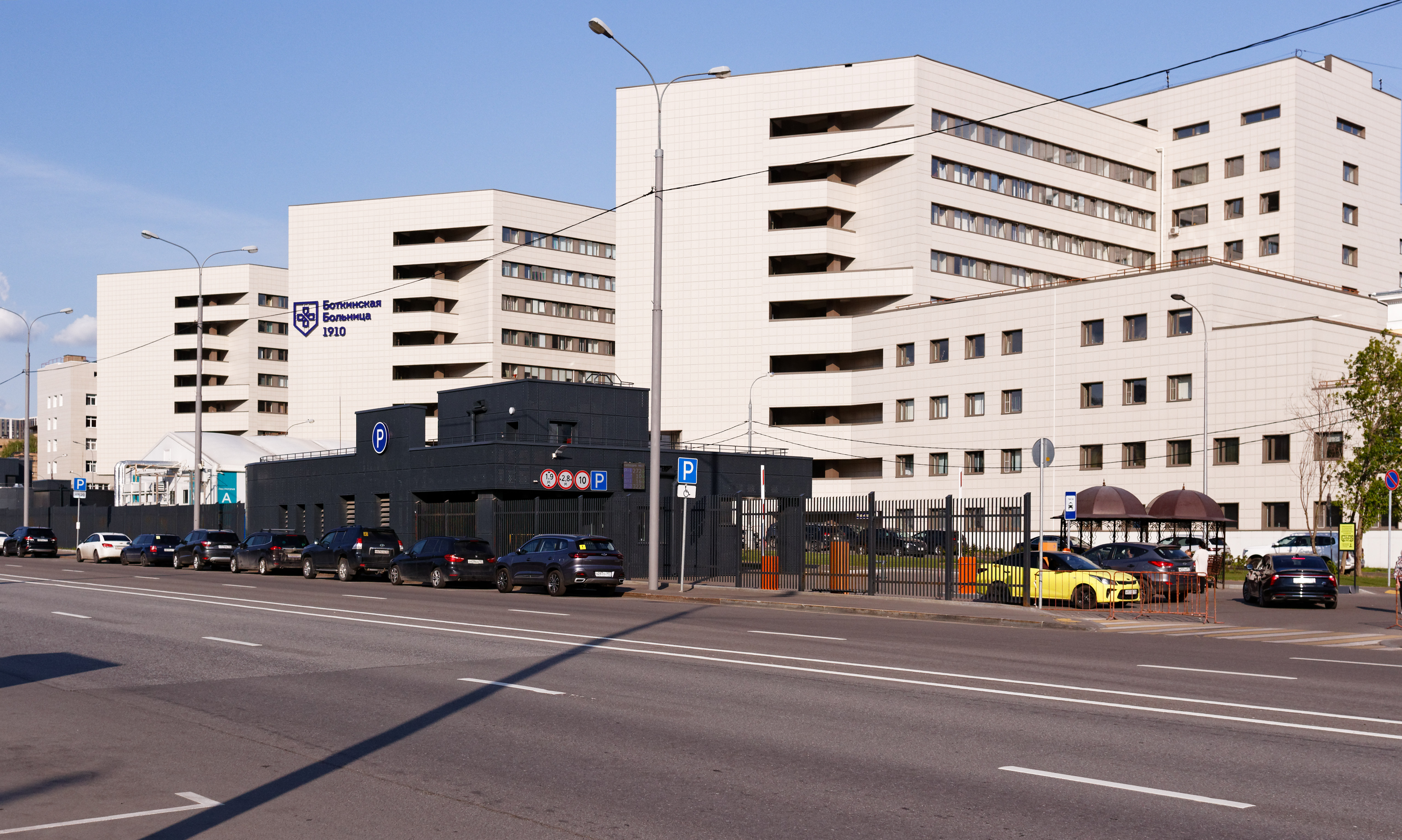

Geography
- Location: Moscow, Russia
- Coordinates: 55°46′53″N 37°32′58″E

Organisation
- Type: Public hospital
- Affiliated university: Healthcare Department of the Government of Moscow

Services
- Emergency department: Yes
- Beds: 1600

Helipads
- Helipad: yes

History
- Founded: December 23, 1910; 115 years ago

Links
- Website: botkinmoscow.ru
- Lists: Hospitals in Russia

The Moscow Botkin Multidisciplinary Scientific-Clinical Center (Russian: Московский многопрофильный научно-клинический центр имени С. П. Боткина) (formerly the Botkin City Clinical Hospital) is a multidisciplinary medical, educational and scientific institution located in the Begovoy District of the Northern Administrative Okrug of Moscow. It was founded on December 23, 1910, and until 1920 was named after Kozma Soldatyonkov.

== History ==
The official opening of the new hospital took place on December 23, 1910. Therapist Fyodor Getye was appointed head physician. Initially, one infectious diseases building was opened, but by 1912, six more were built: therapeutic, surgical, diphtheria, scarlet fever, "for mixed infections" and an admissions department. At the time of the start of patient admission, 12 treatment buildings with 505 beds and residential buildings for medical and service personnel were built. A year later, three more buildings were ready. Doctors such as pathologist and academician Alexei Abrikosov and professor of the medical faculty of Moscow University Vasily Shervinsky worked at the hospital. The clinic was created as an infectious diseases clinic, but therapeutic and surgical departments were also opened to provide a wide range of care.

The buildings were located at a distance of 60-80 m from each other. The buildings had glassed-in verandas that overlooked the garden. Bedridden patients who were unable to go for a walk spent time on these verandas. The wards of the new clinic were usually designed for six people, but there were also single rooms "for restless and unkempt patients." The diet was selected in accordance with the age and severity of the patient's condition.

In December 1920, on the tenth anniversary of the hospital, by decision of the Moscow City Council, the institution was named after the famous infectious disease specialist Sergey Botkin. Two years later, Professor Vladimir Rozanov performed an operation on the premises of the clinic to remove a bullet from Vladimir Lenin after the assassination attempt by the Socialist Revolutionary Fanny Kaplan.

In the late 1930s, a blood transfusion room was organized, which during the Great Patriotic War served as the only city center, over 90 thousand liters of blood were prepared, and a mobile station organized by the hospital workers travelled from Borisoglebsk to Budapest.

During the Great Patriotic War, the hospital served as a hospital. During this time, more than 43 thousand military personnel were operated on. In 1942, the hospital workers contributed 100 thousand rubles to the State Bank of the USSR for the construction of the Botkinets combat aircraft. On June 6, 1947, by decree of the Supreme Soviet of the Soviet Union the clinic was awarded the Order of Lenin.

Among the famous doctors who ran the hospital were Boris Shimeliovich, a member of the Jewish Anti-Fascist Committee (as chief physician from 1931 to 1949), and Nikifor Lapchenko, who became chief physician in 1964. In 1993, a monument to philanthropist Kozma Soldatyonkov was erected on the territory of the clinic.

In 2016, the first short-term hospital (STH) opened, providing high-tech surgical care in a one-day hospital format. In the same year, 21 buildings equipped with modern equipment were opened after major repairs. The activities of the Regional Vascular Center are concentrated in the building.

In 2017, Botkin Hospital was recognized as the best in the Multidisciplinary Clinic nomination as part of the annual Moscow festival among medical workers, Formula of Life.

In 2018, Botkin Hospital was the first among Moscow hospitals to perform human organ and tissue transplants. Currently, the clinic performs heart, liver, kidney, cornea, and bone marrow transplants. Also this year, a scientific and clinical department was created to coordinate research activities.

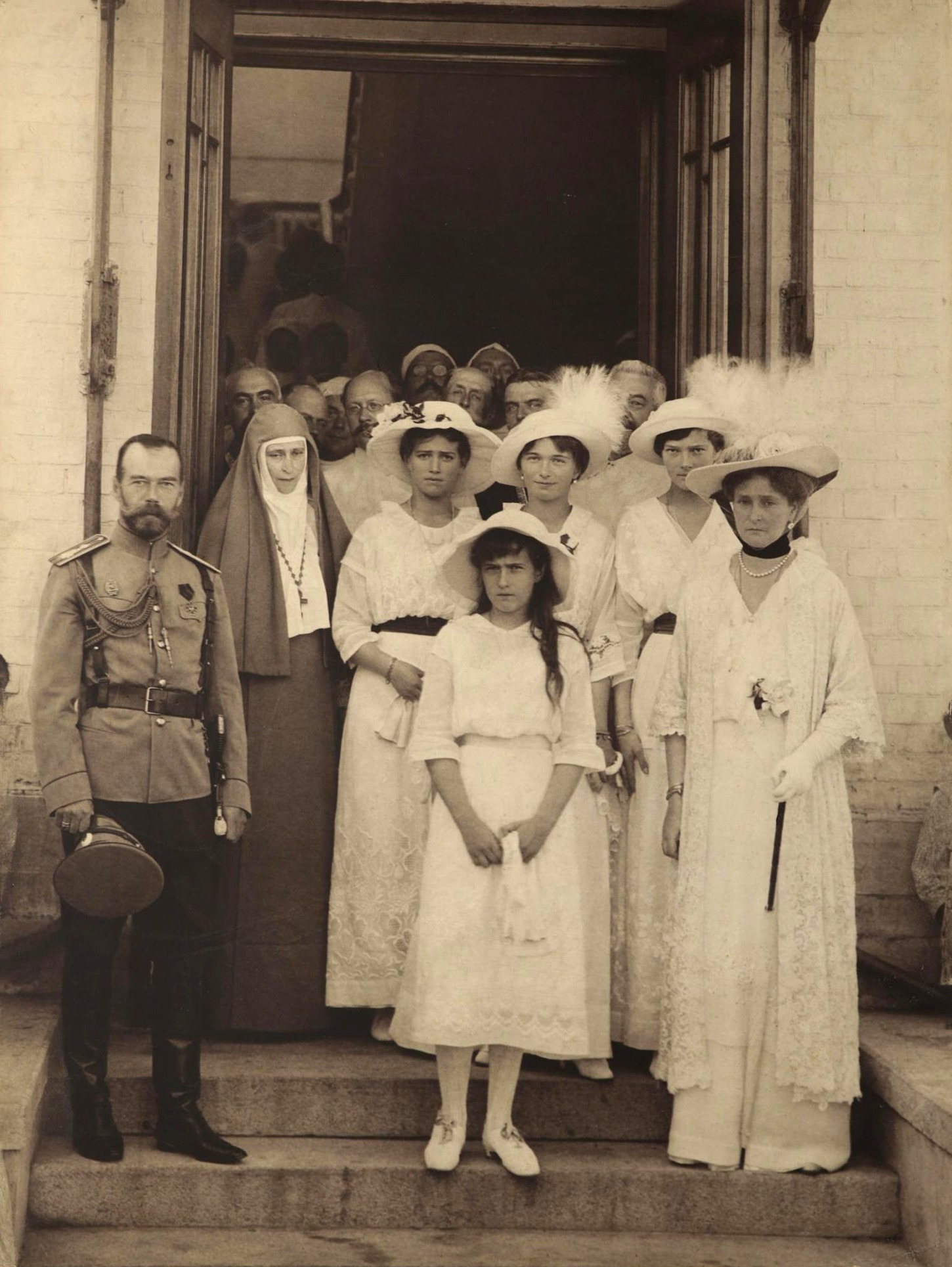
Nicholas II and his family in the hospital during a visit to wounded soldiers, 1915

In 2019, the Government of Moscow approved the development strategy of the Botkin Hospital until 2025, which includes a major overhaul of most of the medical buildings and the construction of a new emergency hospital complex.

In the same year, the City Ophthalmology Center was opened after a major overhaul. The Center offers unique surgeries, including corneal transplantation, treatment of intraocular tumors and eyelid tumors.

In 2019, the Botkin Hospital also became the anchor hospital for providing specialized oncological care to residents of the Western Administrative District. In the same year, after a major overhaul, the 33rd morphological building was opened, in which a modern oncomorphological and molecular laboratory with a capacity of 400 thousand studies per year was created.

In 2020, after a major overhaul, building No. 1 was opened - a cultural heritage site. The building houses the hospital's hematology service. There are 120 hematology beds working around the clock and 1,100 units of the most modern medical equipment. The new building has become the main clinical base of the Moscow City Hematology Center.

On April 28, 2020, in order to provide medical care to patients with coronavirus infection COVID-19, a 125-bed Covid Center was opened, for which building No. 21 was repurposed. During the operation of the Covid Center, 893 patients were treated and 76 emergency surgeries were performed. The Covid Center closed on July 8, 2020. After its closure, building No. 21 was again repurposed into a treatment building with bed units for neurology, neurosurgery, resuscitation and other profiles that are part of the Regional Vascular Center.

In 2021, the Endoscopy Center for the early diagnosis of gastrointestinal oncology diseases, the Outpatient Oncology Care Center and a modern food block with the organization of "tablet" meals were opened.

At the end of 2021, the Interdistrict Nephrology Center was opened on the Botkinskaya base, where patients with kidney diseases can receive the entire cycle of specialized nephrology care in one place - from a consultation at the clinic to a kidney transplant.

In 2022, the Palliative Care Center was opened in a separate building 6 (a cultural heritage site).

On December 13, 2023, the Flagship Emergency Care Center (building No. 30) and the Moscow Urology Center (building No. 20) were opened.

The construction of the Flagship Center with an area of 16.4 thousand square meters began in June 2020. Patients here receive a full range of necessary care - diagnostics, surgical treatment and intensive care - during the first day of hospitalization. Doctors have at their disposal nine state-of-the-art operating rooms, an MRI and two CT scanners, an X-ray complex, a C-arm and an angiography. The Flagship Center has implemented the principle of a digital clinic - medical documentation is kept exclusively in electronic form. There is a helipad on the roof of the flagship center for transporting patients by air ambulance.

The Moscow Urology Center in the renovated 20th building has become the largest robotic urology clinic in Russia. Seven operating rooms have been equipped for surgical interventions, including robotic ones, which are the gold standard of modern urology. Most operations are performed using minimally invasive methods.

As part of the comprehensive development program of the hospital, additional funds have also been allocated for the design and construction of closed overground passages between the hospital buildings. In particular, the passage is organized between the Central Emergency Care Center (building No. 28), medical building No. 22, the Flagship Center for Emergency Care (building No. 30), the morphological building (No. 33) and the Moscow Urological Center (building No. 20). Buildings No. 10, 16, 21, 11, 1 are also connected by passages - thus, all medical buildings of the S.P. Botkin MMNCC will be connected according to the ring principle - for the convenience of movement of personnel and patients at any time of the year and in any weather.
