= Marina Thottan =

Computer scientist

Marina Kuriakkose Thottan is a computer scientist specializing in the performance, management, and security of computer networks and smart grids. She is a principal research scientist at Amazon Web Services.

== Education and career ==
Thottan has a Ph.D. from Rensselaer Polytechnic Institute, completed in 2000. Her dissertation, Fault Detection and Prediction for the Management of Computer Networks, was supervised by Chuanyi Ji.

She became a researcher for Bell Labs in 1999, and became vice president of network and security research there before moving to her present position at Amazon.

== Book ==
With Kenneth C. Budka and Jayant G. Deshpande, Thottan is coauthor of the book Communication Networks for Smart Grids: Making Smart Grid Real (Springer, 2014).

== Recognition ==
Thottan is a Bell Labs Fellow. She was elected as an IEEE Fellow, in the 2018 class of fellows, "for leadership in high-speed internet-protocol networks".
