= Marina Oshana =

American philosopher

Education
- Education: University of California, Davis (MA, PhD), San Francisco State University (BA, MA)

Philosophical work
- Era: 21st-century philosophy
- Region: Western philosophy
- Institutions: University of California, Davis, California State University, Bowling Green State University, University of Florida
- Main interests: political philosophy

Marina A. L. Oshana is an American philosopher and professor emeritus at the University of California, Davis. She is known for her works on political theory.

== Books ==
- Personal Autonomy in Society (Ashgate, 2006)
- The Importance of How We See Ourselves: Self-Identity and Responsible Agency (Rowman and Littlefield, 2010)
- Personal Autonomy and Social Oppression: Philosophical Perspectives (ed.), (Routledge, 2014).
- (ed. with Catriona Mackenzie and Katrina Hutchison) Social Dimensions of Moral Responsibility. Oxford University Press, 2018.
