= Marina Pellizzer =

Italian footballer

Personal information
- Date of birth: 8 February 1972 (age 54)
- Position: Midfielder

Senior career*
Years	Team	Apps	(Gls)
- Foroni Verona

International career
- Italy
- * Club domestic league appearances and goals

Marina Pellizzer (born 8 February 1972) is an Italian women's international footballer who plays as a midfielder. She is a member of the Italy women's national football team. She was part of the team at the UEFA Women's Euro 2001. On club level she plays for Foroni Verona in Italy.
