= Marina Brogi =

Italian economist and author (born 1967)

Marina Brogi (born 15 July 1967) is an Italian economist, Full Professor of Banking and Capital Markets at Sapienza University of Rome, author of numerous publications on corporate governance, banking and capital markets.

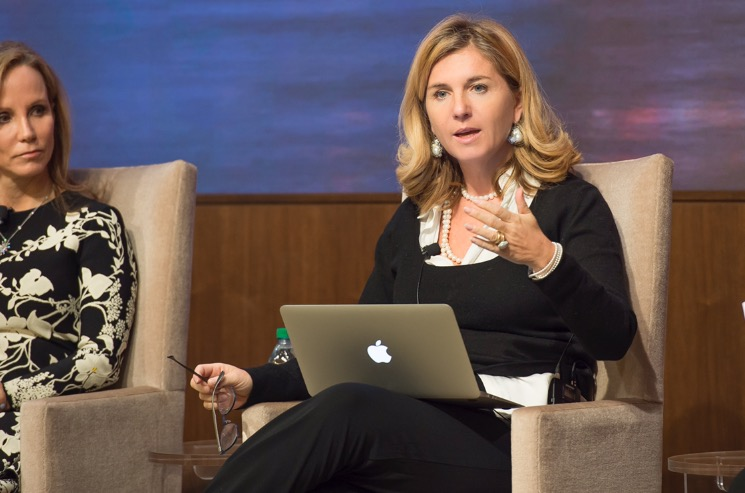
Marina Brogi, WCD Global Institute, New York, 4 May 2016

== Studies ==
She studied at Roedean School (Brighton, United Kingdom) and graduated with honors in Economics at Bocconi University under the supervision of Prof. Tancredi Bianchi. Afterwards, she completed her economic studies at the London Business School. During the university period she was awarded several prizes and scholarships such as an IBM scholarship for a summer course in computer science, an Erasmus scholarship to finance her studies abroad, the Banca Luino and Varese scholarship and the Prize Ugo La Malfa "Being a European citizen" - university students section.

== Activities ==
=== Academic career ===
She started her academic career as a researcher at Bocconi University, in the Banking field. Afterwards, she became Associate Professor of Financial Markets at Sapienza University of Rome and since 2007 she is Full Professor of "International Banking and Capital Markets" and "Disclosure, Governance and Capital Markets". In 2011 she was also appointed Deputy Dean of the Faculty of Economics and she maintained the position until 2017. She has over twenty years of experience in research and training in banking and finance. She gained experience both at graduate and postgraduate level in several European universities and business schools (Bocconi University, Ca' Foscari University of Venice, London Business School, BI Norwegian Business School, Zagreb Business School, SDA Bocconi).

=== Board positions ===
Currently, she is an independent director and member of the Human Resources Committee of Luxottica Group, in which she was nominated by the minority slate presented by Italian and foreign institutional investors. She attends Salini Impregilo's board of directors meetings as an independent director, moreover, she is Chairperson of the Remuneration and Nominating Committee, as well as a member of the Committee for Related Party Transactions. She is also an independent Member of the Board of Directors, Chairperson of the Transactions with Related Parties Committee, Member of the Nomination Committee at Banco di Desio e della Brianza. Previously she was appointed independent director of A2A (also Deputy Chairman of the Remuneration Committee), Prelios (member of the Audit and Risk Committee), UBI Banca (member of the Remuneration Committee and the Risks Committee), UBI Paramerica Asset Management (Joint Venture between UBI and Prudential Inc.).

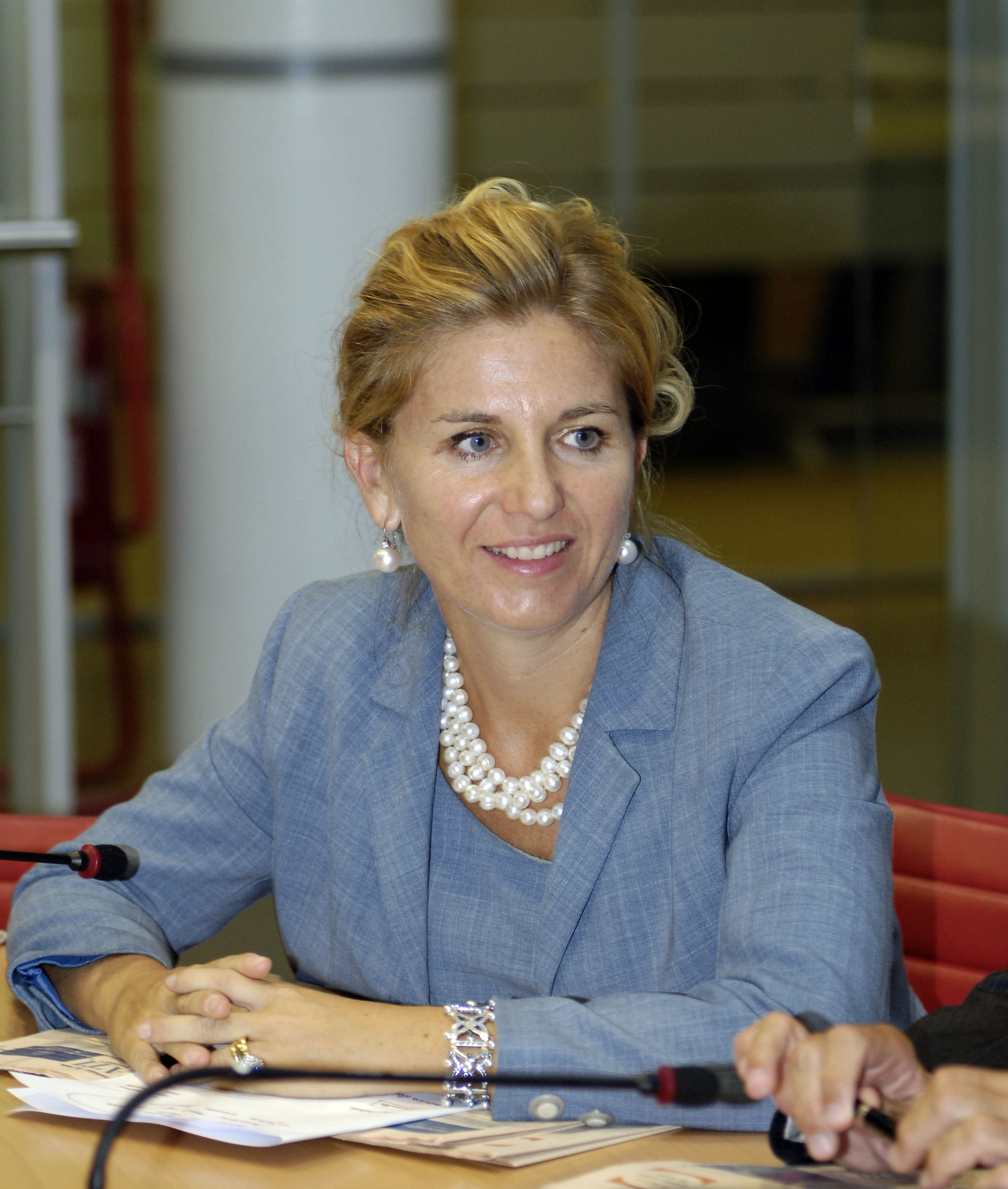

=== Relation with institutions ===
- European Securities and Markets Authority (ESMA) - Member of the Securities and Markets Stakeholder Group
- Bank of Italy - Appointed by the Bank of Italy in different governance bodies responsible for crisis procedures of banks and other intermediaries subject to supervision.
- Consob - She has participated as commissioner in numerous public competitions.
- Parliament and Ministries - She was a consultant to the Ministry of the Interior and was interviewed as an expert in Hearing at the XI Senate Labor Committee and VI Finance Committee of the Chamber of Deputies. Last public hearings: Finance Commission of the Italian Camera – 13.07.2016; Parliamentary Commission on Simplification of Financial Services Regulation 15.11.2016. She was appointed by the Labour Minister, Member of the Working Group for the control and monitoring of the application of the Italian Law 120/2012 in state-controlled companies to the Council Presidency.

=== Collaborations ===
She is often interviewed as an expert in economics by the main Italian television news magazines (TG1, TG1 Economics, Special TG1, TG7, Class-CNBC, Sky Italia) and radio (Radio 1 and Radio 24). She is the author of numerous articles in the press (Il Sole 24 Ore, CorrierEconomia, Finanza e Mercati, Libero Mercato, Bloomberg).

== Publications ==
She is author of numerous scientific publications on banking and corporate governance. The most recent are listed below.

- Brogi, Marina (2016). Corporate governance. Milano. Egea.
- Brogi, Marina. " Board governance and firm performance: are financial intermediaries different?". Corporate Ownership and Control 8(2).
- Minichilli A., Brogi M., Calabrò A. (2016). "Weathering the Storm: Family Ownership, Governance and Performance through the Financial and Economic Crisis. Corporate Governance: An International Review. 24(6):552-568.
- Brogi M., Calabrò A. e Torchia M (2015). What does really matter in the internationalization of small and medium-sized family businesses? Journal of Small Business Management. (Impact Factor: 1.361);
- Brogi, Marina (2015). Shadow banking, banking union and capital markets union. Law and Economic Review, n. 2, 2015, p. 383 -400;
- Huse M., Hansen K., Machold S., Brogi M. (2013). Getting women on to corporate boards: a snowball starting in Norway, Edward Elgar Publishing, 2013, p. 1 - 190;
