= Marina Garcés =

Spanish philosopher

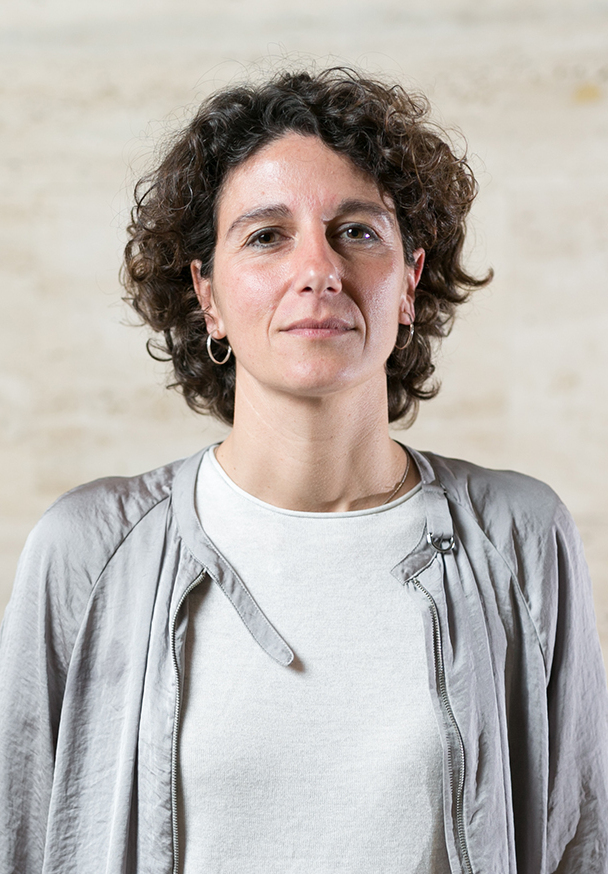
- Marina Garcés in 2018
- Born: 28 November 1973 (age 52); Barcelona, Spain
- Known for: Philosopher
- Notable work: Filosofia inacabada

Marina Garcés Mascareñas (born 28 November 1973 in Barcelona) is a Spanish philosopher and essayist. She is a professor of philosophy at the University of Zaragoza and part of a collective project of critical and experimental thinking called Espai en Blanc (Blank Space). She has published several essays on contemporary politics and critical thought, including Filosofía inacabada (Galaxia Gutenberg, 2015), Fora de classe. Textos de filosofia de guerrilla (Arcadia, 2016), Nova il·lustració radical (Anagrama, 2018) and Ciutat Princesa (2018)

== Biography ==
Garcés studied philosophy at the University of Barcelona, where she received her doctorate in 2001. Since 2002, she promotes and coordinates the “Espai en Blanc” (Blank Space) project, a collective investment towards a committed, practical and experimental relationship with philosophical thinking. Garcés lives in Barcelona but works at the University of Zaragoza, where she teaches a philosophy course on comparative philosophies of East and West. Her work has been influenced by philosophers like Merleau-Ponty and Diderot.
