= Marina Petrukhina =

Russian chemist

- Born: March 15, 1963 (age 63)
- Education: Moscow State University
- Scientific career
- Workplaces: Texas A&M University; University at Albany

Marina Petrukhina (born March 15, 1963) is a Russian chemist who is the Carla Rizzo Delray Professor of Chemistry at the University at Albany. Her research investigates organometallic and coordination chemistry in curved molecular systems. She was elected Fellow of the American Chemical Society in 2023.

== Early life and education ==
Petrukhina studied chemistry at Moscow State University. She remained in Moscow for her doctoral research, where she specialized in inorganic chemistry. She then moved to the United States, where she worked as a postdoctoral researcher at Texas A&M University.

== Research and career ==
Petrukhina works on transition metal clusters, supramolecular and materials chemistry. In 2001, she joined the University at Albany, SUNY, where she was awarded an National Science Foundation CAREER Award.

== Awards and honors ==
- 2005 Dr. Nuala McGann Drescher Award, State of New York/United University Professions
- 2013 University at Albany, SUNY President's Award for Excellence in Research
- 2023 Elected Fellow of the American Chemical Society
- 2026 American Chemical Society George A. Olah Award in Hydrocarbon or Petroleum Chemistry

== Selected publications ==
- Alexander V Zabula; Alexander S Filatov; Sarah N Spisak; Andrey Yu Rogachev; Marina A Petrukhina (2011). "A main group metal sandwich: five lithium cations jammed between two corannulene tetraanion decks". Science. 333 (6045): 1008–1011. Bibcode:2011Sci...333.1008Z. doi:10.1126/science.1208686. PMID 21852497. Wikidata Q29038075.
- Marina A Petrukhina; Kristian W Andreini; James Mack; Scott, Lawrence (2005). "X-ray quality geometries of geodesic polyarenes from theoretical calculations: what levels of theory are reliable?". The Journal of Organic Chemistry. 70 (14): 5713–5716. doi:10.1021/jo050233e. PMID 15989357. Wikidata Q46576487.
- Alexander S. Filatov; Marina A. Petrukhina (2010). "Probing the binding sites and coordination limits of buckybowls in a solvent-free environment: Experimental and theoretical assessment". Coordination Chemistry Reviews. 254 (17–18): 2234–2246. doi:10.1016/j.ccr.2010.05.004. Wikidata Q115461242.
