= Marina Lazarević =

Serbian actress

Marina Lazarević (Serbian Cyrillic: Марина Лазаревић; born on 3 January 1980 in Belgrade, [then part of PR Serbia in Yugoslavia]) is a Serbian theater, film, and television actress.

Lazarević graduated from Belgrade's Faculty of Drama Arts in 2003, and during her career played many roles in theater. She works now in "Zoran Radmilović" theater in Zaječar.

== Selected filmography ==
- Gorki plodovi (series, 2008)
- Mansarda 2 (series, 2009)
- U mraku (2011)
- Ulica lipa (series, 2015)
