= Bonfiglioli =

Bonfiglioli is an Italian surname. Notable people with the surname include:

- Alessandra Bonfiglioli (born 1963), Italian high jumper
- Francisco Bonfiglio (born 2002), an Argentine footballer
- Kyril Bonfiglioli (1928–1985), English art-dealer, magazine editor, and comic novelist
- Óscar Bonfiglio (1905-1987), a Mexican football goalkeeper
- Susanna Bonfiglio (born 1974), an Italian former basketball player

== Organizations ==
- Bonfiglioli Group, an Italian company
