= Athletics at the 1983 Summer Universiade – Women's high jump =

The women's high jump event at the 1983 Summer Universiade was held at the Commonwealth Stadium in Edmonton, Canada with the final on 10 and 11 July 1983.

== Medalists ==
Gold	Silver	Bronze
Tamara Bykova; Soviet Union	Silvia Costa; Cuba	Maryse Éwanjé-Épée; France

== Results ==
=== Qualification ===
Rank	Athlete	Nationality	Result	Notes
1	Silvia Costa	Cuba	1.84	
1	Yang Wenqin	China	1.84	
1	Coleen Sommer	United States	1.84	
1	Brigitte Reid	Canada	1.84	
1	Tamara Bykova	Soviet Union	1.84	
1	Marina Sysoyeva	Soviet Union	1.84	
1	Ann Bair	United States	1.84	
8	Biljana Bojović	Yugoslavia	1.84	
8	Maryse Éwanjé-Épée	France	1.84	
?	Julie White	Canada	1.84	
?	Isabel Mozún	Spain	1.80	
?	Alessandra Bonfiglioli	Italy	1.80	
?	Niculina Vasile	Romania	1.80	
14	Lucienne N'Da	Ivory Coast	1.75	

=== Final ===
Rank	Athlete	Nationality	Result	Notes
1st place, gold medalist(s)	Tamara Bykova	Soviet Union	1.98	UR
2nd place, silver medalist(s)	Silvia Costa	Cuba	1.98	UR
3rd place, bronze medalist(s)	Maryse Éwanjé-Épée	France	1.92	
4	Marina Sysoyeva	Soviet Union	1.90	
5	Brigitte Reid	Canada	1.90	
6	Coleen Sommer	United States	1.90	
7	Ann Bair	United States	1.87	
8	Yang Wenqin	China	1.87	
9	Niculina Vasile	Romania	1.87	
10	Isabel Mozún	Spain	1.84	=NR
11	Biljana Bojović	Yugoslavia	1.84	
12	Alessandra Bonfiglioli	Italy	1.84	
13	Julie White	Canada	1.75	
