= Gmina Olszanka =

Gmina Olszanka may refer to either of the following rural administrative districts in Poland:

- Gmina Olszanka, Opole Voivodeship
- Gmina Olszanka, Masovian Voivodeship
