= Jankowice Wielkie =

- Village
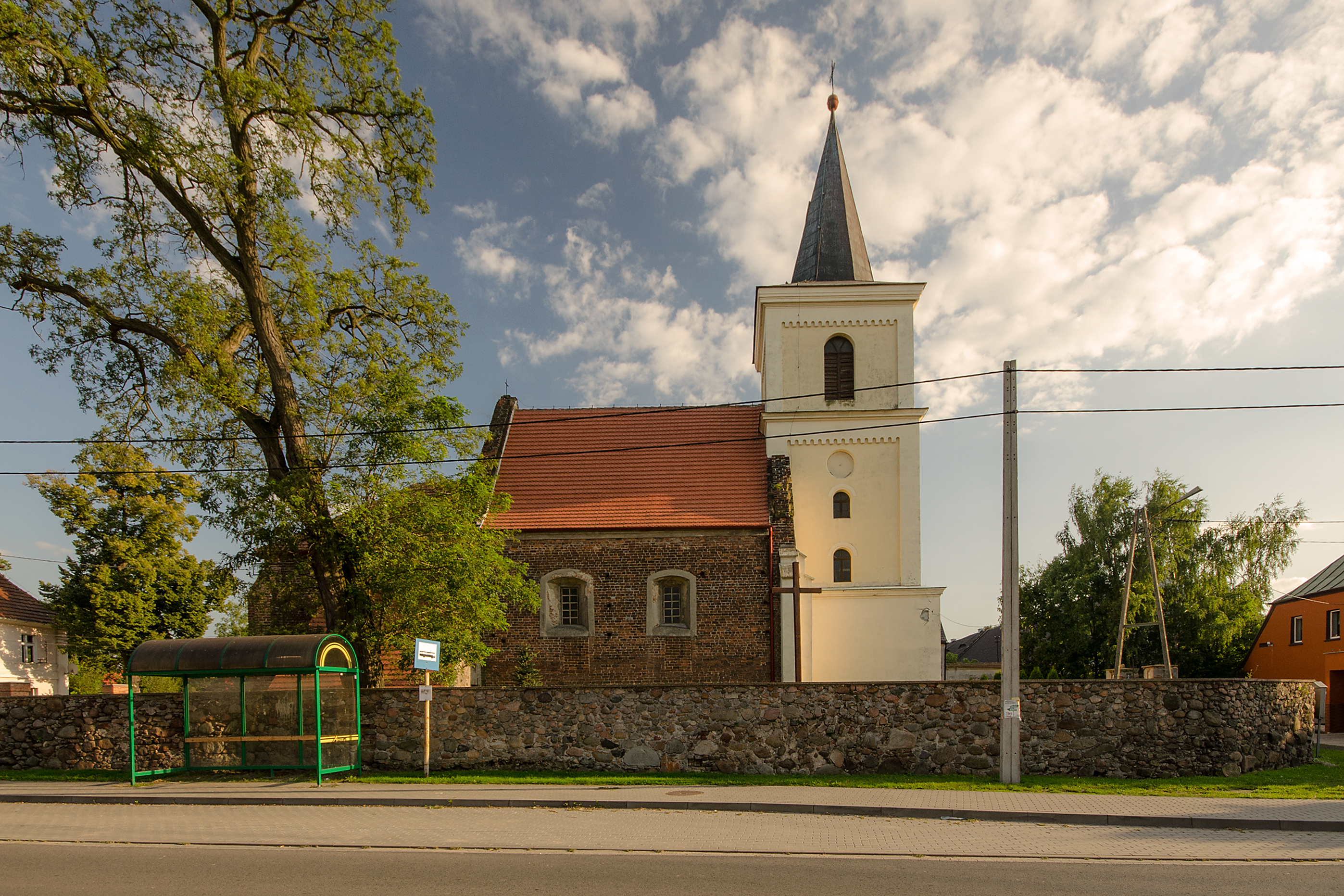
- Church of the Assumption

- Location within Poland
- Coordinates: 50°46′N 17°26′E
- Country: Poland
- Voivodeship: Opole
- County: Brzeg
- Gmina: Olszanka

Population
  - Total: 750
- Time zone: UTC+1 (CET)
  - Summer (DST): UTC+2 (CEST)
- Vehicle registration: OB

Jankowice Wielkie [jankɔˈvit͡sɛ ˈvjɛlkʲɛ] is a village in the administrative district of Gmina Olszanka, within Brzeg County, Opole Voivodeship, in south-western Poland.

The settlement os located in the historic Lower Silesia region, approximately 4 km (2 mi) south-west of Olszanka, 12 km (7 mi) south of Brzeg, and 37 km (23 mi) west of the regional capital Opole.

The name of the village is of Polish origin and comes from the given name Janek or Janko, a diminutive of Jan (John).

In the final stages of World War II, in January 1945, a German-organized death march of Allied prisoners of war from the Stalag Luft 7 POW camp passed through the village.
