= Danuta Bułkowska =

Polish high jumper (born 1959)

Personal information
- Nationality: Polish
- Born: 31 January 1959 (age 67) Olszanka, Poland
- Height: 1.78 m (5 ft 10 in)
- Weight: 57 kg (126 lb)

Sport
- Event: High jump
- Club: AZS Wrocław
Medal record
Women's athletics
Representing Poland
World Indoor Championships
Bronze medal – third place	1985 Paris	High jump
European Indoor Championships
Bronze medal – third place	1984 Gothenburg	High jump
Bronze medal – third place	1985 Piraeus	High jump
Summer Universiade
Bronze medal – third place	1985 Kobe	High jump

Danuta Bułkowska-Milej (born 31 January 1959 in Olszanka) is a Polish athlete who competed in the high jump. Her 1984 personal best (1.97 m) stood as the Polish record for 29 years, only being beaten in 2013.

She started her career in the late 1970s. She won the title of the champion of Poland (outdoor) nine times (1977, 1982, 1983, 1984, 1985, 1986, 1987, 1988 and 1989), and five times on the outdoor championships (1983, 1984, 1985, 1986 and 1987). In addition to that, she took part in the 1978 European Championships in Prague and the 1980 Summer Olympics in Moscow. During the 1986 European Championships in Stuttgart she came in seventh, a place she held also at the European Indoor Championships in Liévin 1987. Among her most notable international successes were the bronze medals at the 1985 World Indoor Games in Paris and the European Indoor Championships in Göteborg 1984 and Piraeus 1985.

== Competition record ==
Year	Competition	Venue	Position	Notes
Representing Poland
1980	Olympic Games	Moscow, Soviet Union	13th (q)	1.85 m
1984	European Indoor Championships	Gothenburg, Sweden	3rd	1.95 m (iNR)
1984	Friendship Games	Moscow, Soviet Union	6th	1.90 m
1985	World Indoor Games	Paris, France	3rd	1.90 m
1985	European Indoor Championships	Piraeus, Greece	3rd	1.90 m
1985	Universiade	Kobe, Japan	3rd	1.91 m
1986	European Championships	Stuttgart, West Germany	7th	1.90 m
1987	European Indoor Championships	Liévin, France	7th	1.88 m
1987	Universiade	Zagreb, Croatia	6th	1.88 m

== See also ==
- Polish records in athletics
