= Michelau =

Michelau may refer to the following places:

- Michelau in Oberfranken, in the district of Lichtenfels, Bavaria, Germany
- Michelau im Steigerwald, in the district of Schweinfurt, Bavaria, Germany
- Michelau, Luxembourg, part of Bourscheid
- Michałów, Opole Voivodeship
- Michale, Kuyavian-Pomeranian Voivodeship
