= Athletics at the 1991 Summer Universiade – Women's high jump =

The women's high jump event at the 1991 Summer Universiade was held at the Don Valley Stadium in Sheffield on 24 July 1991.

== Medalists ==
Gold	Silver	Bronze
Alison Inverarity; Australia	Svetlana Lavrova; Soviet Union	Tisha Waller; United States

== Results ==
=== Qualification ===
Rank	Group	Athlete	Nationality	Result	Notes
?	?	Orlane dos Santos	Brazil	1.85	
?	?	Tisha Waller	United States	1.85	
?	?	Yelena Yelesina	Soviet Union	1.85	
?	?	Šárka Nováková	Czechoslovakia	1.85	
?	?	Alison Inverarity	Australia	1.85	
?	?	Yolanda Henry	United States	1.85	
?	?	Svetlana Lavrova	Soviet Union	1.85	
?	?	Julia Bennett	Great Britain	1.85	
?	?	Maria Constanza Moroni	Italy	1.85	
?	?	Kerry Roberts	Great Britain	1.82	
?	?	Alena Varcholová	Czechoslovakia	1.82	
?	?	Eszter Bölöni	Hungary	1.82	
?	?	Stella Agbaegbu	Nigeria	1.79	
?	?	Beate Holzapfel	Germany	1.79	
?	?	Stella Sedame	Ghana	1.76	
?	?	Jin Ling	China	1.73	
?	?	Su Chun-yueh	Chinese Taipei	1.70	
?	?	Ann Larsson	Sweden	1.70	
	?	Gai Kapernick	Australia	NM	

=== Final ===
Rank	Athlete	Nationality	1.75	1.80	1.84	1.87	1.90	1.92	1.94	Result	Notes
1st place, gold medalist(s)	Alison Inverarity	Australia	–	o	o	–	xxo	o	xxx	1.92	
2nd place, silver medalist(s)	Svetlana Lavrova	Soviet Union	–	o	o	o	o	xo	xxx	1.92	
3rd place, bronze medalist(s)	Tisha Waller	United States	o	o	o	xo	xxo	xxx		1.90	
4	Yelena Yelesina	Soviet Union	–	o	xo	xxo	xxo	–	xxx	1.90	
5	Orlane dos Santos	Brazil								1.87	
6	Šárka Nováková	Czechoslovakia								1.87	
7	Eszter Bölöni	Hungary								1.87	
8	Yolanda Henry	United States								1.84	
9	Julia Bennett	Great Britain	o	o	xo	xxx				1.84	
10	Kerry Roberts	Great Britain	o	xo	xo	xxx				1.84	
11	Maria Constanza Moroni	Italy								1.80	
12	Alena Varcholová	Czechoslovakia								1.75	
