= Athletics at the 1989 Summer Universiade – Women's high jump =

The women's high jump event at the 1989 Summer Universiade was held at the Wedaustadion in Duisburg on 26 and 27 August 1989.

== Medalists ==
| Gold | Silver | Bronze |
|---|---|---|
| Alina Astafei; Romania | Silvia Costa; Cuba | Jin Ling; China |

== Results ==
=== Qualification ===
| Rank | Group | Athlete | Nationality | Result | Notes |
|---|---|---|---|---|---|
| ? | ? | Andrea Arens | West Germany | 1.85 | Q |
| ? | ? | Alina Astafei | Romania | 1.85 | Q |
| ? | ? | Niki Bakoyianni | Greece | 1.85 | Q |
| ? | ? | Silvia Costa | Cuba | 1.85 | Q |
| ? | ? | Maryse Éwanjé-Épée | France | 1.85 | Q |
| ? | ? | Shelley Fehrman | United States | 1.85 | Q |
| ? | ? | Cristina Fink | Mexico | 1.85 | Q |
| ? | ? | Marion Goldkamp | West Germany | 1.85 | Q |
| ? | ? | Natalya Golodnova | Soviet Union | 1.85 | Q |
| ? | ? | Yolanda Henry | United States | 1.85 | Q |
| ? | ? | Jin Ling | China | 1.85 | Q |
| ? | ? | Beatrice Landes | France | 1.85 | Q |
| ? | ? | Megumi Sato | Japan | 1.85 | Q |
| ? | ? | Olga Turchak | Soviet Union | 1.85 | Q |
| ? | ? | Wang Wei | China | 1.85 | Q |
| ? | ? | Jeannie Cockroft | Canada | 1.85 | Q |
| ? | ? | Niki Gavera | Greece | 1.85 | Q |
| ? | ? | Orlane dos Santos | Brazil | 1.79 | |

=== Final ===
| Rank | Athlete | Nationality | Result | Notes |
|---|---|---|---|---|
| 1st place, gold medalist(s) | Alina Astafei | Romania | 1.91 | |
| 2nd place, silver medalist(s) | Silvia Costa | Cuba | 1.91 | |
| 3rd place, bronze medalist(s) | Jin Ling | China | 1.88 | |
| 4 | Yolanda Henry | United States | 1.88 | |
| 5 | Marion Goldkamp | West Germany | 1.85 | |
| 6 | Andrea Arens | West Germany | 1.85 | |
| 7 | Shelley Fehrman | United States | 1.80 | |
| 7 | Natalya Golodnova | Soviet Union | 1.80 | |
| 7 | Olga Turchak | Soviet Union | 1.80 | |
| 7 | Maryse Éwanjé-Épée | France | 1.80 | |
| 7 | Megumi Sato | Japan | 1.80 | |
| 12 | Niki Bakoyianni | Greece | 1.80 | |
| 13 | Wang Wei | China | 1.80 | |
| 13 | Beatrice Landes | France | 1.80 | |
| 13 | Cristina Fink | Mexico | 1.80 | |
| | Jeannie Cockroft | Canada | NM | |
| | Niki Gavera | Greece | NM | |
