= Moritz Karl Ernst von Prittwitz =

Prussian military officer (1795–1885)

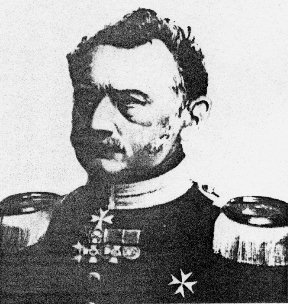
- Born: February 9, 1795; Gut Kreisewitz, Lower Silesia Poland
- Died: October 21, 1885 (aged 90); Berlin, Germany
- Occupation: Military general
- Honours: Order of St. John as a Knight of Honor

Moritz Karl Ernst von Prittwitz (9 February 1795, Gut Kreisewitz in Alzenau, Lower Silesia – 21 October 1885 in Berlin) was a Royal Prussian Lieutenant-General of Infantry, who supervised the building of the large fortress in Ulm. He was later admitted to the Order of St. John as a Knight of Honor.

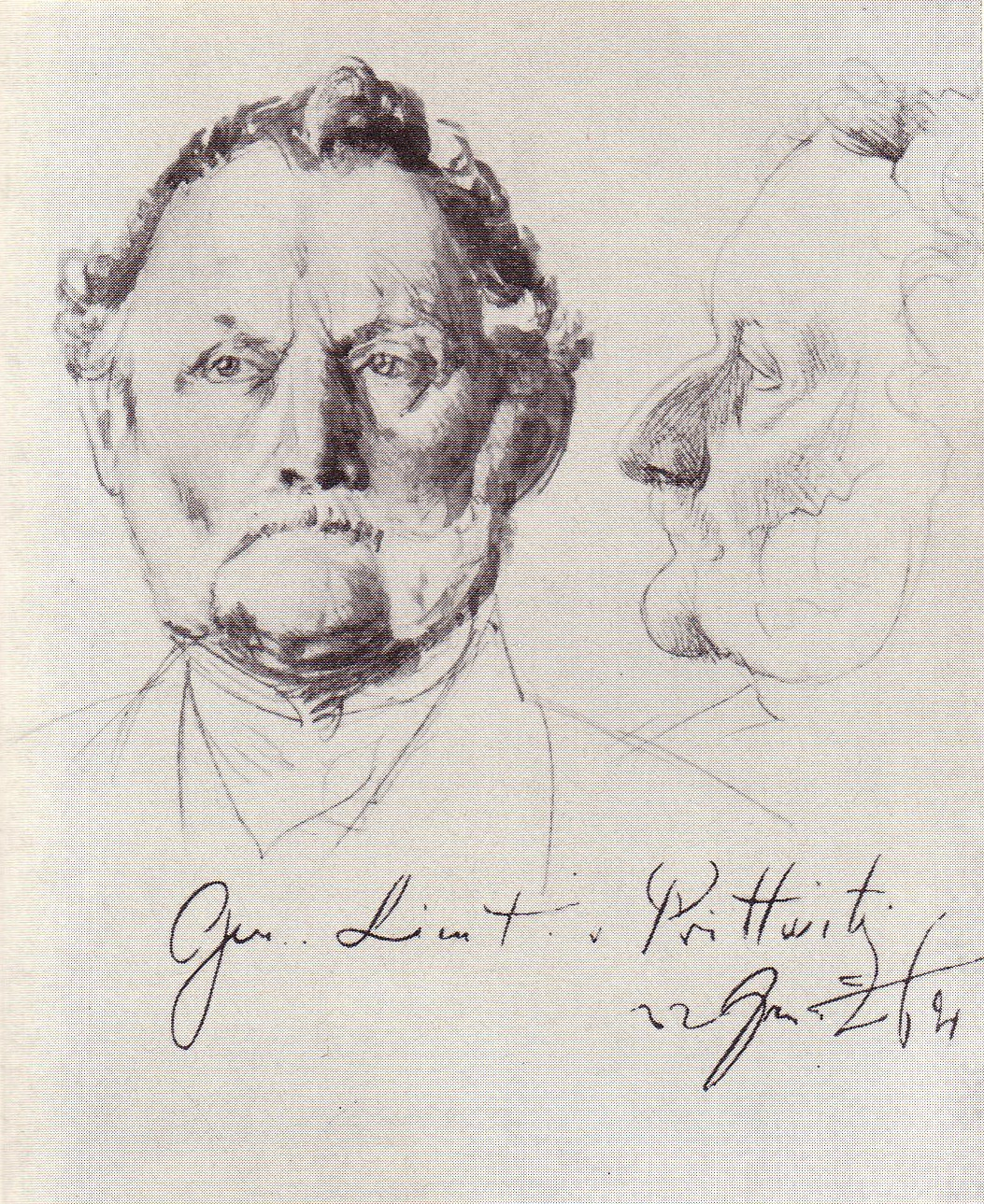
Moritz von Prittwitz (Adolph Menzel, Nationalgalerie Berlin)

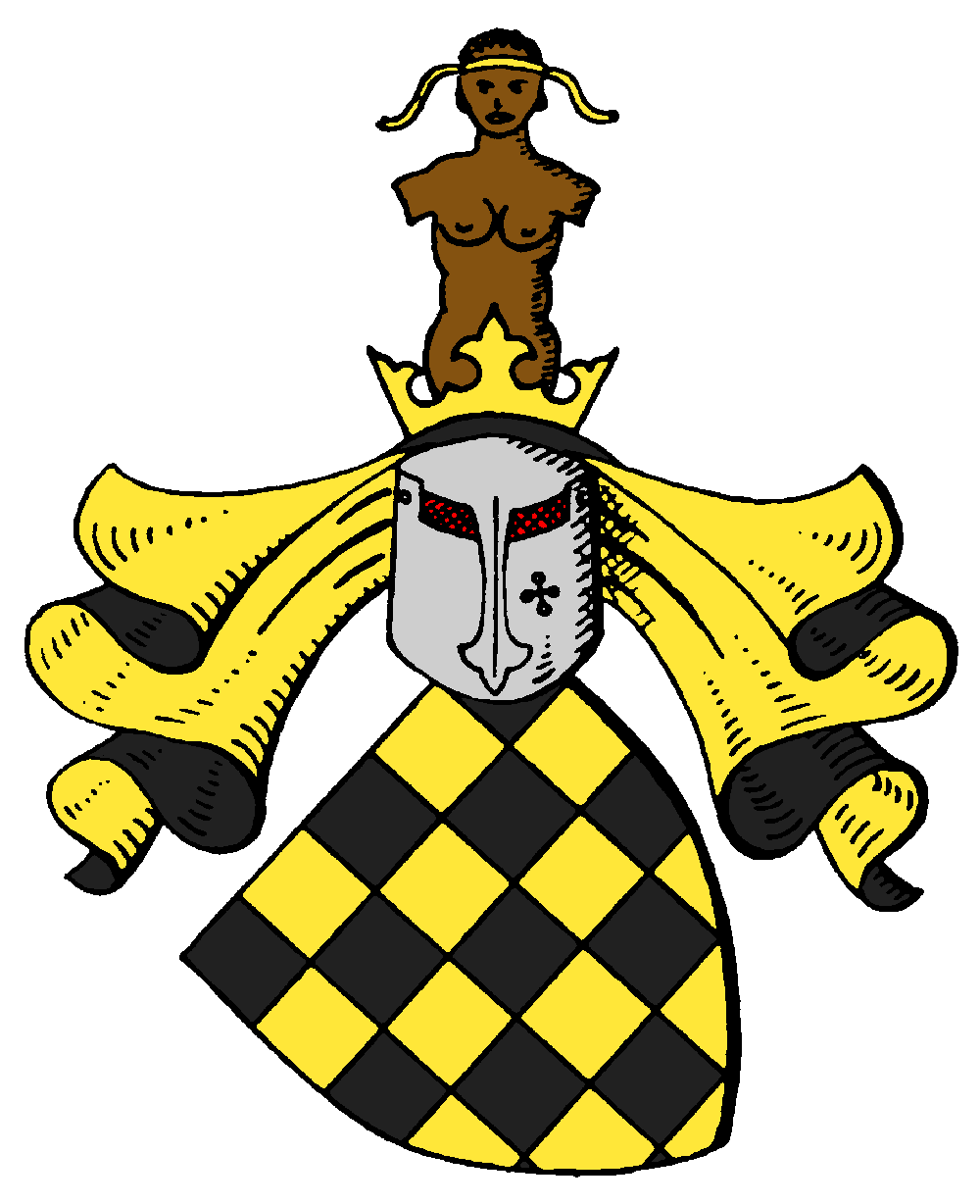
The Arms of the von Prittwitz und Gaffron family

== See also ==
- Ernst von Prittwitz und Gaffron as son of Prittwitz
