= 1990 World Junior Championships in Athletics – Women's high jump =

The women's high jump event at the 1990 World Junior Championships in Athletics was held in Plovdiv, Bulgaria, at Deveti Septemvri Stadium on 9 and 10 August.

== Medalists ==
Gold	Svetlana Lavrova; Soviet Union
Silver	Katja Kilpi; Finland
Bronze	Lea Haggett; United Kingdom

== Results ==
=== Final ===
10 August

Rank	Name	Nationality	Result	Notes
1st place, gold medalist(s)	Svetlana Lavrova	Soviet Union	1.91	
2nd place, silver medalist(s)	Katja Kilpi	Finland	1.88	
3rd place, bronze medalist(s)	Lea Haggett	United Kingdom	1.88	
4	Ioamnet Quintero	Cuba	1.85	
5	Hajnalka Véghová	Czechoslovakia	1.85	
6	Erzsebet Fazekas	Hungary	1.81	
6	Šárka Nováková	Czechoslovakia	1.81	
8	Desislava Angelova	Bulgaria	1.81	
8	Antonella Bevilacqua	Italy	1.81	
10	Andrea Hughes	Australia	1.81	
11	Tanya Hughes	United States	1.81	
12	Tatyana Bakhareva	Soviet Union	1.73	

=== Qualifications ===
9 Aug

==== Group A ====
Rank	Name	Nationality	Result	Notes
1	Lea Haggett	United Kingdom	1.80	q
1	Hajnalka Véghová	Czechoslovakia	1.80	q
1	Svetlana Lavrova	Soviet Union	1.80	q
1	Tanya Hughes	United States	1.80	q
5	Tatyana Bakhareva	Soviet Union	1.80	q
6	Antonella Bevilacqua	Italy	1.80	q
7	Andrea Hughes	Australia	1.80	q
8	Desislava Angelova	Bulgaria	1.80	q
8	Ioamnet Quintero	Cuba	1.80	q
8	Katja Kilpi	Finland	1.80	q
8	Šárka Nováková	Czechoslovakia	1.80	q
12	Erzsebet Fazekas	Hungary	1.80	q
13	Zhao Yangwu	China	1.75	
14	Debora Locatelli	Italy	1.75	
15	Reeta Laaksonen	Finland	1.75	
15	Nathalie Lefèbvre	France	1.75	
15	Nkechi Madubuko	West Germany	1.75	
15	Diane Guthrie	Jamaica	1.75	
19	Oana Musunoiu	Romania	1.70	
19	Michelle Choppa	United States	1.70	

== Participation ==
According to an unofficial count, 20 athletes from 15 countries participated in the event.

- Australia (1)
- Bulgaria (1)
- China (1)
- Cuba (1)
- Czechoslovakia (2)
- Finland (2)
- France (1)
- Hungary (1)
- Italy (2)
- Jamaica (1)
- Romania (1)
- Soviet Union (2)
- United Kingdom (1)
- United States (2)
- West Germany (1)
