= Obórki, Opole Voivodeship =

Obórki
- Village
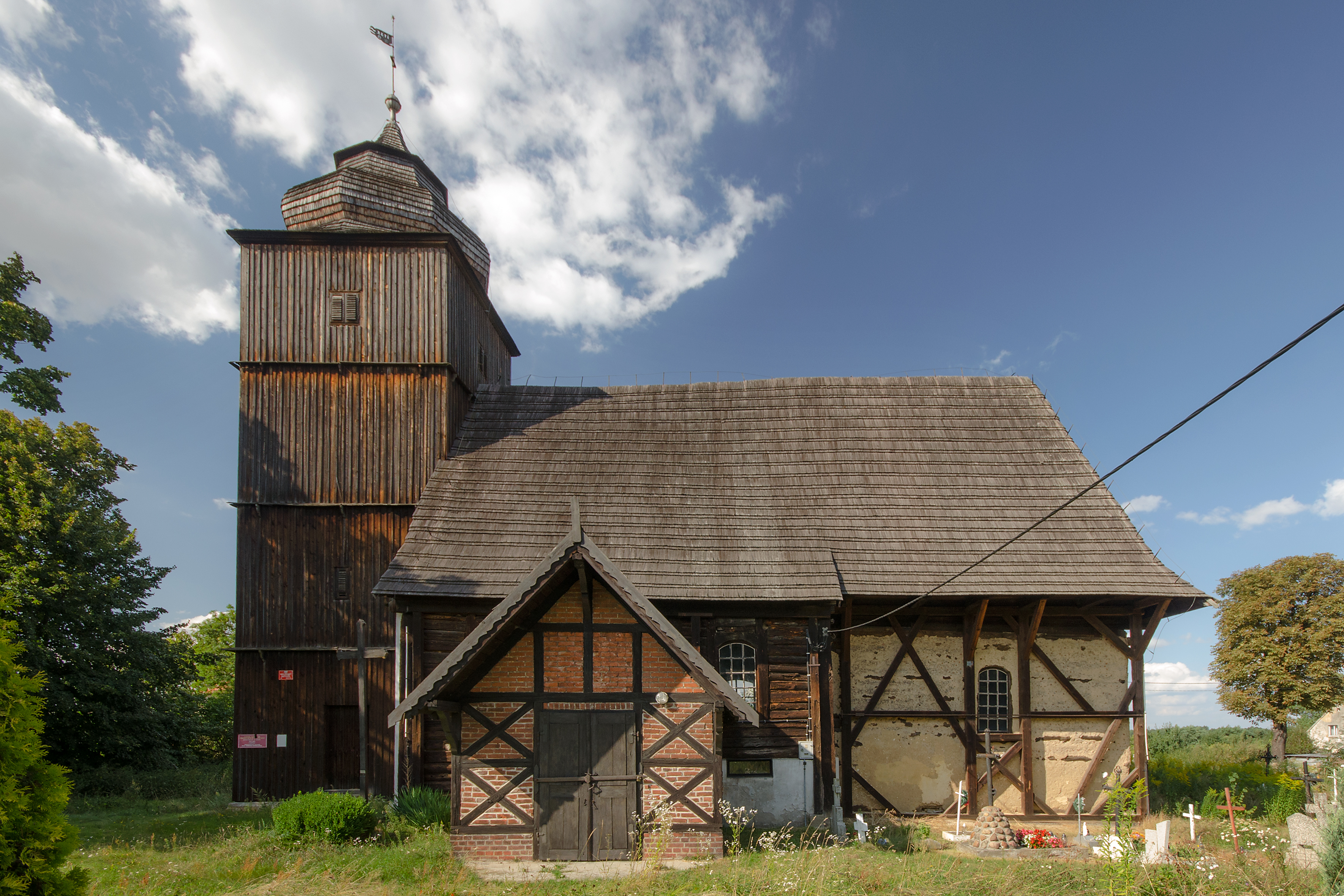
- Polish-Catholic Saints Peter and Paul church in Obórki

- Location within Poland
- Coordinates: 50°47′33″N 17°25′35″E
- Country: Poland
- Voivodeship: Opole
- County: Brzeg
- Gmina: Olszanka

Population
  - Total: 320
- Time zone: UTC+1 (CET)
  - Summer (DST): UTC+2 (CEST)
- Vehicle registration: OB

Obórki [ɔˈburki] is a village in the administrative district of Gmina Olszanka, within Brzeg County, Opole Voivodeship, in south-western Poland.

== History ==
In the final stages of World War II, in January 1945, a German-organized death march of Allied prisoners of war from the Stalag Luft 7 POW camp passed through the village.
