= Janów, Opole Voivodeship =

Janów
- Village
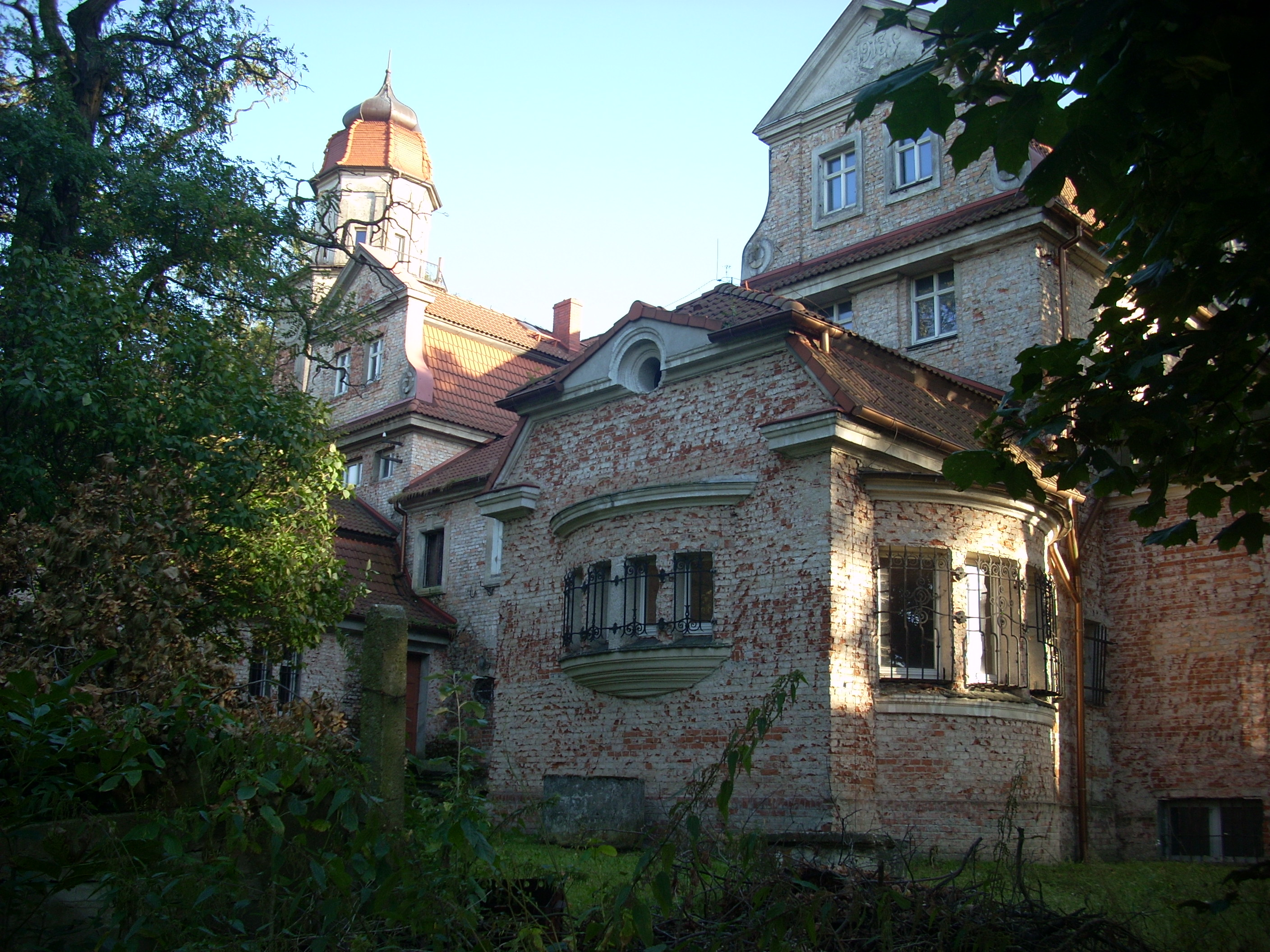
- Palace

- Location within Poland
- Coordinates: 50°47′13″N 17°31′16″E
- Country: Poland
- Voivodeship: Opole
- County: Brzeg
- Gmina: Olszanka

Janów [ˈjanuf] is a village in the administrative district of Gmina Olszanka, within Brzeg County, Opole Voivodeship, in south-western Poland.
