= Athletics at the 1983 Pan American Games – Women's high jump =

Women's high jump at the Pan American Games

The women's high jump event at the 1983 Pan American Games was held in Caracas, Venezuela on 25 August.

== Results ==
Rank	Name	Nationality	Result	Notes
1st place, gold medalist(s)	Coleen Sommer	United States	1.91	
2nd place, silver medalist(s)	Silvia Costa	Cuba	1.88	
3rd place, bronze medalist(s)	Joni Huntley	United States	1.82	
4	Orlane dos Santos	Brazil	1.76	
	Victoria Despaigne	Cuba	NM	
