= 1985 European Athletics Indoor Championships – Women's high jump =

The women's high jump event at the 1985 European Athletics Indoor Championships was held on 3 March.

== Results ==
Rank	Name	Nationality	1.75	1.80	1.85	1.90	1.94	1.97	2.00	Result	Notes
1st place, gold medalist(s)	Stefka Kostadinova	Bulgaria	–	o	o	o	xo	xo	xxx	1.97	
2nd place, silver medalist(s)	Susanne Helm	East Germany	o	o	o	xo	xo	xxx		1.94	
3rd place, bronze medalist(s)	Danuta Bułkowska	Poland	–	–	o	o	xxx			1.90	
4	Susanne Lorentzon	Sweden	o	o	o	xo	xxx			1.90	
5	Brigitte Rougeron	France	o	o	xxo	xxo	xxx			1.90	
6	Andrea Mátay	Hungary	–	o	o	xxx				1.85	
7	Sabine Skvara	Austria	xo	o	xo	xxx				1.85	
8	Maryse Éwanjé-Épée	France	–	o	xxx					1.80	
9	Susanne Nilsson	Sweden	xxo	o	xxx					1.80	
