= Athletics at the 1987 Pan American Games – Women's high jump =

Women's high jump at the Pan American Games

The women's high jump event at the 1987 Pan American Games was held in Indianapolis, United States on 14 August.

== Results ==
Rank	Name	Nationality	Result	Notes
1st place, gold medalist(s)	Coleen Sommer	United States	1.96	GR
2nd place, silver medalist(s)	Silvia Costa	Cuba	1.92	
3rd place, bronze medalist(s)	Mazel Thomas	Jamaica	1.88	
4	Orlane dos Santos	Brazil	1.88	
5	Phyllis Bluntson	United States	1.84	
6	Cristina Fink	Mexico	1.70	
