= Athletics at the 1985 Summer Universiade – Women's high jump =

The women's high jump event at the 1985 Summer Universiade was held at the Kobe Universiade Memorial Stadium in Kobe on 3 September 1985.

== Results ==
Rank	Athlete	Nationality	Result	Notes
1st place, gold medalist(s)	Silvia Costa	Cuba	2.01	UR
2nd place, silver medalist(s)	Lyudmila Petrus	Soviet Union	1.93	
3rd place, bronze medalist(s)	Danuta Bułkowska	Poland	1.91	
4	Megumi Sato	Japan	1.89	
5	Liang Shaoping	China	1.86	
6	Zheng Dazhen	China	1.86	
7	Jeannie Cockroft	Canada	1.86	
8	Phyllis Blunston	United States	1.83	
9	Tamara Malešev	Yugoslavia	1.83	
10	Mary Moore	United States	1.83	
11	Sigrid Kirchmann	Austria	1.83	
12	Masami Matsui	Japan	1.80	
13	Alison Armstrong	Canada	1.75	
14	Cristina Sisniega	Mexico	1.75	
