= Pogorzela, Opole Voivodeship =

Pogorzela
- Village
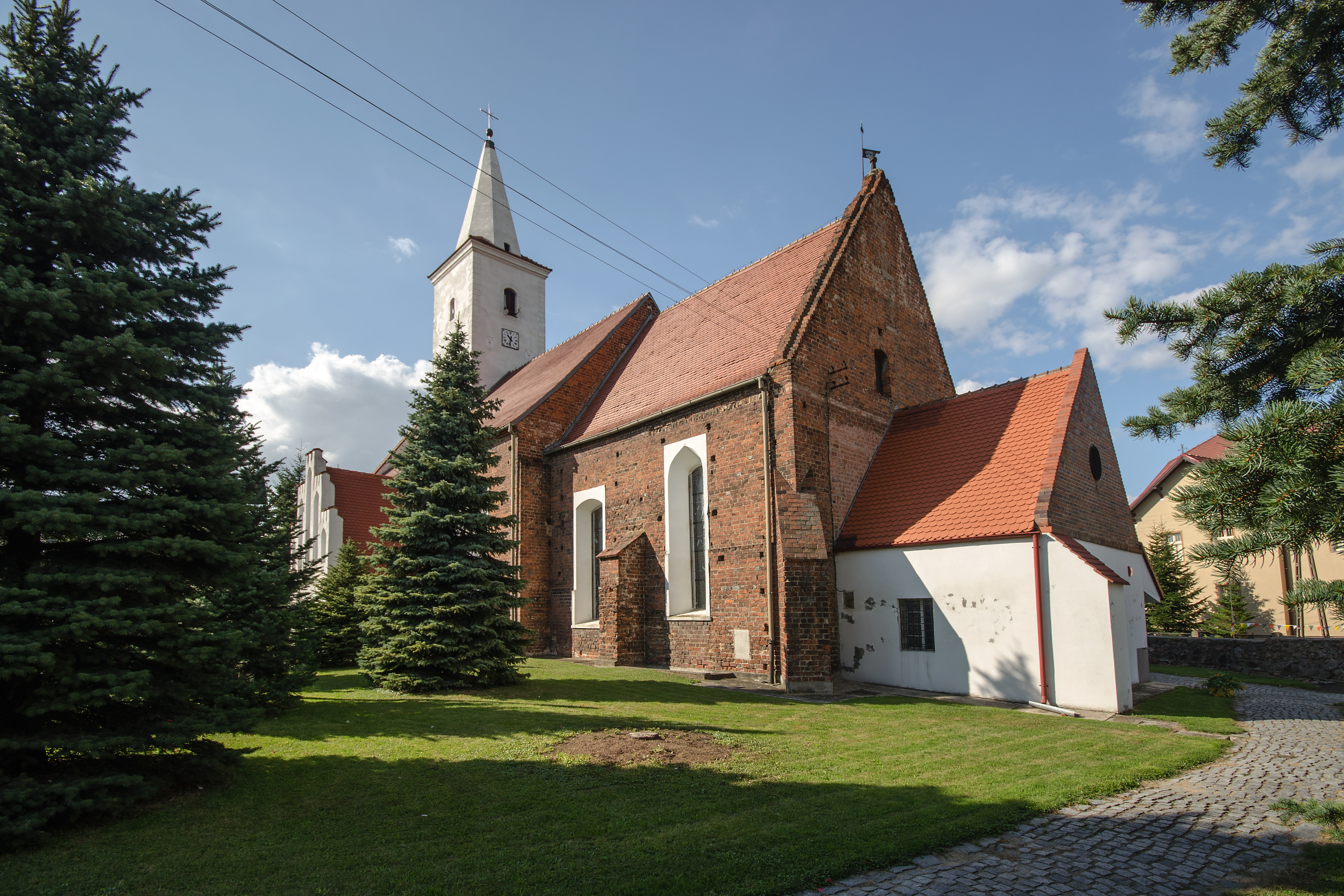
- Sacred Heart church in Pogorzela

- Location within Poland
- Coordinates: 50°47′N 17°29′E
- Country: Poland
- Voivodeship: Opole
- County: Brzeg
- Gmina: Olszanka
- Time zone: UTC+1 (CET)
  - Summer (DST): UTC+2 (CEST)
- Vehicle registration: OB

Pogorzela [pɔɡɔˈʐɛla] is a village in the administrative district of Gmina Olszanka, within Brzeg County, Opole Voivodeship, in south-western Poland.

== History ==
Pogorzela was the ancestral seat of the Pogorzelski family of Grzymała coat of arms. In 1333, Duke Bolesław III the Generous from the Piast dynasty granted the village to Przecław of Pogorzela and his brother. In 1344, Bishop Przecław granted various benefits from the village to the monastery in Kamieniec Ząbkowicki.

== Notable people ==
- Przecław of Pogorzela (1310–1376), Bishop of Wrocław
