= Przylesie, Opole Voivodeship =

Przylesie
- Village
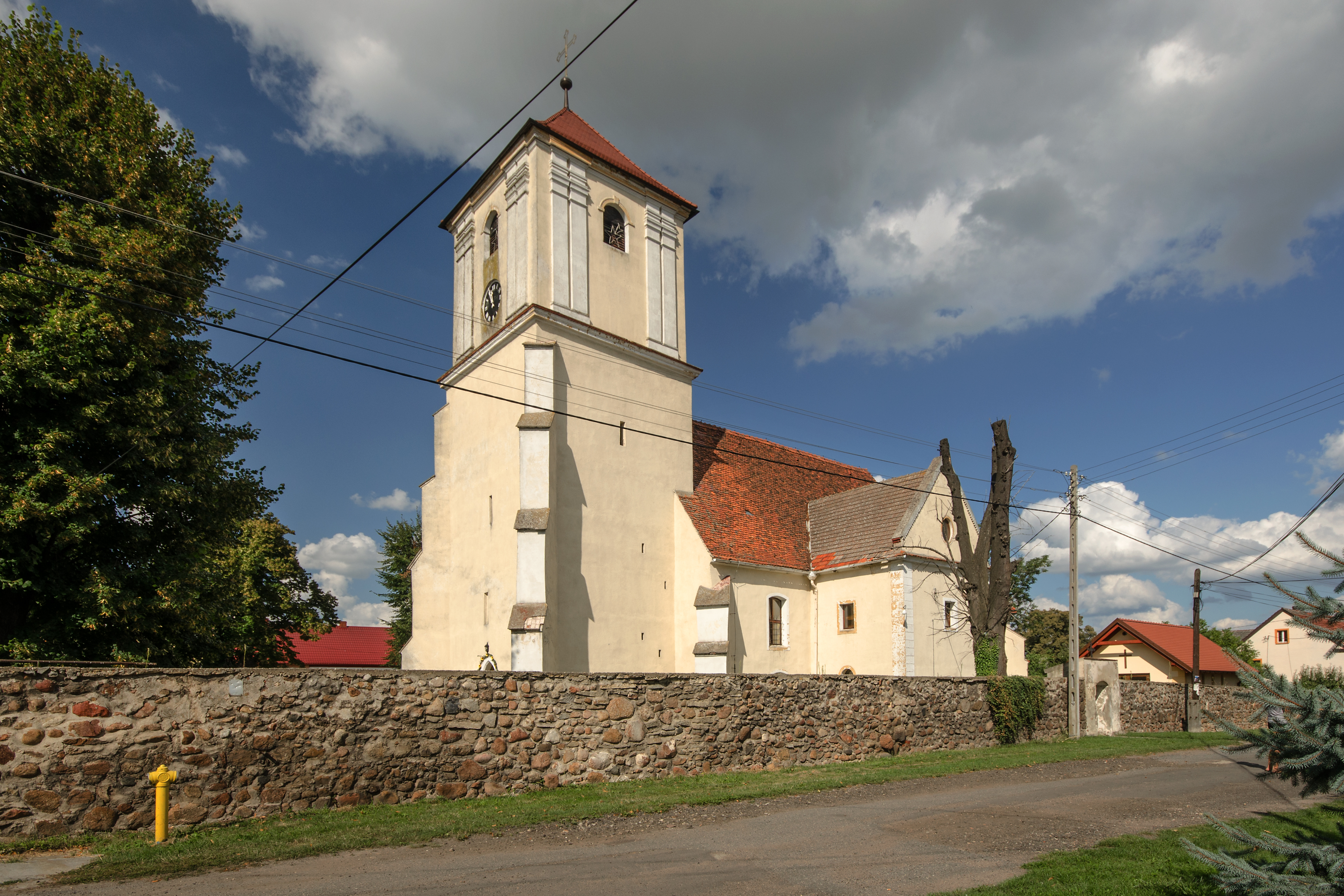
- Church of St. Stanislaw Kosta and St. Nicholas

- Location within Poland
- Coordinates: 50°47′30″N 17°23′28″E
- Country: Poland
- Voivodeship: Opole
- County: Brzeg
- Gmina: Olszanka
- Population: 800

Przylesie [pʂɨˈlɛɕɛ] is a village in the administrative district of Gmina Olszanka, within Brzeg County, Opole Voivodeship, in south-western Poland.
