= Silvia Costa (athlete) =

Cuban high jumper (born 1964)

Personal information
- Full name: Silvia Costa Acosta-Martínez
- Born: May 4, 1964 (age 62) La Palma, Pinar del Río Province, Cuba
- Height: 179 cm (5 ft 10 in)
Medal record
Women's athletics
Representing Cuba
World Championships
Silver medal – second place	1993 Stuttgart	High jump
World Indoor Games
Bronze medal – third place	1985 Paris	High jump
World Cup
Gold medal – first place	1989 Barcelona	High jump
Pan American Games
Silver medal – second place	1983 Caracas	High jump
Silver medal – second place	1987 Indianapolis	High jump
Silver medal – second place	1995 Mar del Plata	High jump
Universiade
Gold medal – first place	1985 Kobe	High jump
Silver medal – second place	1983 Edmonton	High jump
Silver medal – second place	1989 Duisburg	High jump

Silvia Costa Acosta-Martínez (born May 4, 1964, in La Palma, Pinar del Río Province) is a former high jumper from Cuba.

== Career ==
Costa is most known for winning medals at the 1985 IAAF World Indoor Championships and the 1993 World Championships in Athletics. She also has three medals from the Summer Universiade. Her personal best jump (set in 1989) is 2.04 m (6 ft 8 1/4 in), which makes her a member of the female two metres club and puts her ninth in the all-time performers list. She is also a three-time silver medallist at the Pan American Games.

== Personal life ==
Costa is married to Spanish citizen José Sanleandro.

== International competitions ==
Year	Competition	Venue	Position	Event	Notes
Representing Cuba
1978	Central American and Caribbean; Junior Championships (U-17)	Xalapa, Mexico	1st	High jump	1.60m A
1978	Central American and Caribbean; Junior Championships (U-17)	Xalapa, Mexico	5th	Long jump	4.99m A
1978	Central American and Caribbean; Junior Championships (U-17)	Xalapa, Mexico	2nd	100 m hurdles	15.76s A
1978	Central American and Caribbean; Junior Championships (U-20)	Xalapa, Mexico	2nd	4x100 m relay	48.02s A
1982	Central American and Caribbean Games	Havana, Cuba	1st	High jump	1.90 m
1983	Universiade	Edmonton, Canada	2nd	High jump	1.98 m
1983	World Championships	Helsinki, Finland	10th	High jump	1.84 m
1983	Pan American Games	Caracas, Venezuela	2nd	High jump	1.88 m
1985	World Indoor Games	Paris, France	3rd	High jump	1.90 m
1985	Universiade	Kobe, Japan	1st	High jump	2.01 m
1986	Central American and Caribbean Games	Santiago, Dominican Republic	1st	High jump	1.96 m
1986	Ibero-American Championships	Havana, Cuba	1st	High jump	1.84 m
1987	Pan American Games	Indianapolis, United States	2nd	High jump	1.92 m
1987	World Championships	Rome, Italy	4th	High jump	1.96 m
1988	Ibero-American Championships	Mexico City, Mexico	1st	High jump	1.97 m A
1989	Universiade	Duisburg, Germany	2nd	High jump	1.91 m
1989	World Cup	Barcelona, Spain	1st	High jump	2.04 m
1990	Central American and Caribbean Games	Mexico City, Mexico	2nd	High jump	1.82 m
1992	Ibero-American Championships	Seville, Spain	2nd	High jump	1.93 m
1992	Olympic Games	Barcelona, Spain	6th	High jump	1.94 m
1993	World Indoor Championships	Toronto, Canada	7th	High jump	1.94 m
1993	World Championships	Stuttgart, Germany	2nd	High jump	1.97 m
1995	Pan American Games	Mar del Plata, Argentina	2nd	High jump	1.91 m
1995	World Championships	Gothenburg, Sweden	24th (q)	High jump	1.85 m
