= Athletics at the 1983 Pan American Games – Women's heptathlon =

Women's heptathlon at the Pan American Games

The women's heptathlon event at the 1983 Pan American Games was held in Caracas, Venezuela on 24 and 25 August. It was the first time that this event was held at the Games replacing the pentathlon.

== Results ==
The highest mark recorded in each event is highlighted in yellow

Rank	Athlete	Nationality	100m H	HJ	SP	200m	LJ	JT	800m	Points	Notes
1st place, gold medalist(s)	Conceição Geremias	Brazil	14.00	1.80	12.94	24.42	6.04	40.10	2:16.89	6084	AR
2nd place, silver medalist(s)	Cindy Greiner	United States	13.92	1.83	12.24	24.66	6.10	38.23	2:14.81	6069	
3rd place, bronze medalist(s)	Elida Aveillé	Cuba	13.26	1.65	11.02	24.66	6.36	39.50	2:32.99	5755	
4	Leyda Castro	Dominican Republic	14.44	1.50	9.30	25.56	5.45	28.30	2:42.01	4776	
5	Victoria Despaigne	Cuba	14.69	1.80	10.53	26.55	5.89	NM	2:41.35	4595	
6	Emy González	Venezuela	15.43	1.50	10.55	25.56	5.04	20.52	2:32.13	4518	
	Jill Ross	Canada	14.37	1.68	11.63	25.68	5.38	DNS	–	DNF	
	Marlene Harmon	United States	DNF	DNS	–	–	–	–	–	DNF	
