= Gierszowice =

- Village
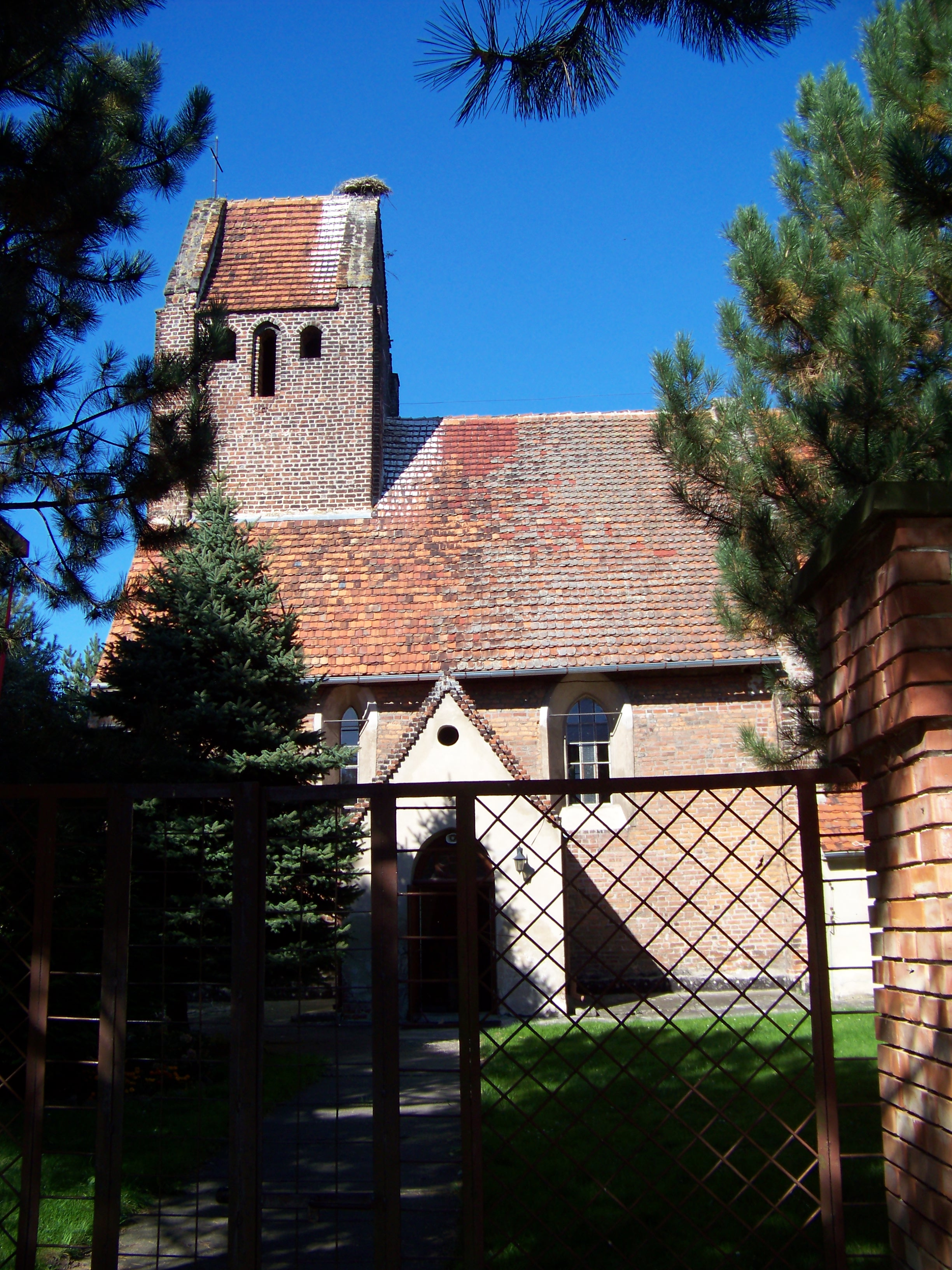
- Catholic church

- Location within Poland
- Coordinates: 50°48′N 17°30′E
- Country: Poland
- Voivodeship: Opole
- County: Brzeg
- Gmina: Olszanka

Gierszowice [ɡʲɛrʂɔˈvit͡sɛ] (German Giersdorf) is a village in the administrative district of Gmina Olszanka, within Brzeg County, Opole Voivodeship, in south-western Poland.

== See also ==
- Brzeg water tower
