= Athletics at the 1987 Pan American Games – Women's heptathlon =

Women's heptathlon at the Pan American Games

The women's heptathlon event at the 1987 Pan American Games was held in Indianapolis, United States on 9 and 10 August.

== Results ==
The highest mark recorded in each event is highlighted in yellow

Rank	Athlete	Nationality	100m H	HJ	SP	200m	LJ	JT	800m	Points	Notes
1st place, gold medalist(s)	Cindy Greiner	United States	13.45	1.72	13.97	24.24	6.40	38.96	2:16.23	6184	GR
2nd place, silver medalist(s)	Connie Polman-Tuin	Canada	14.23	1.69	12.79	24.29	6.17	38.63	2:15.83	5862	
3rd place, bronze medalist(s)	Jolanda Jones	United States	14.83	1.81	11.89	25.01	6.35	34.34	2:14.22	5823	
4	Linda Spenst	Canada	13.80	1.69	10.86	25.39	5.96	42.67	2:18.55	5688	
5	Hildelisa Despaigne	Cuba	14.67	1.78	11.58	26.43	5.75	38.27	2:27.10	5371	
6	Carmen Bezanilla	Chile	14.08	1.72	10.62	25.04	5.68	28.52	2:19.85	5237	
	Orlane dos Santos	Brazil	14.54	1.83	11.99	25.78	5.91	39.85	DNS	DNF	
