= Czeska Wieś =

- Village
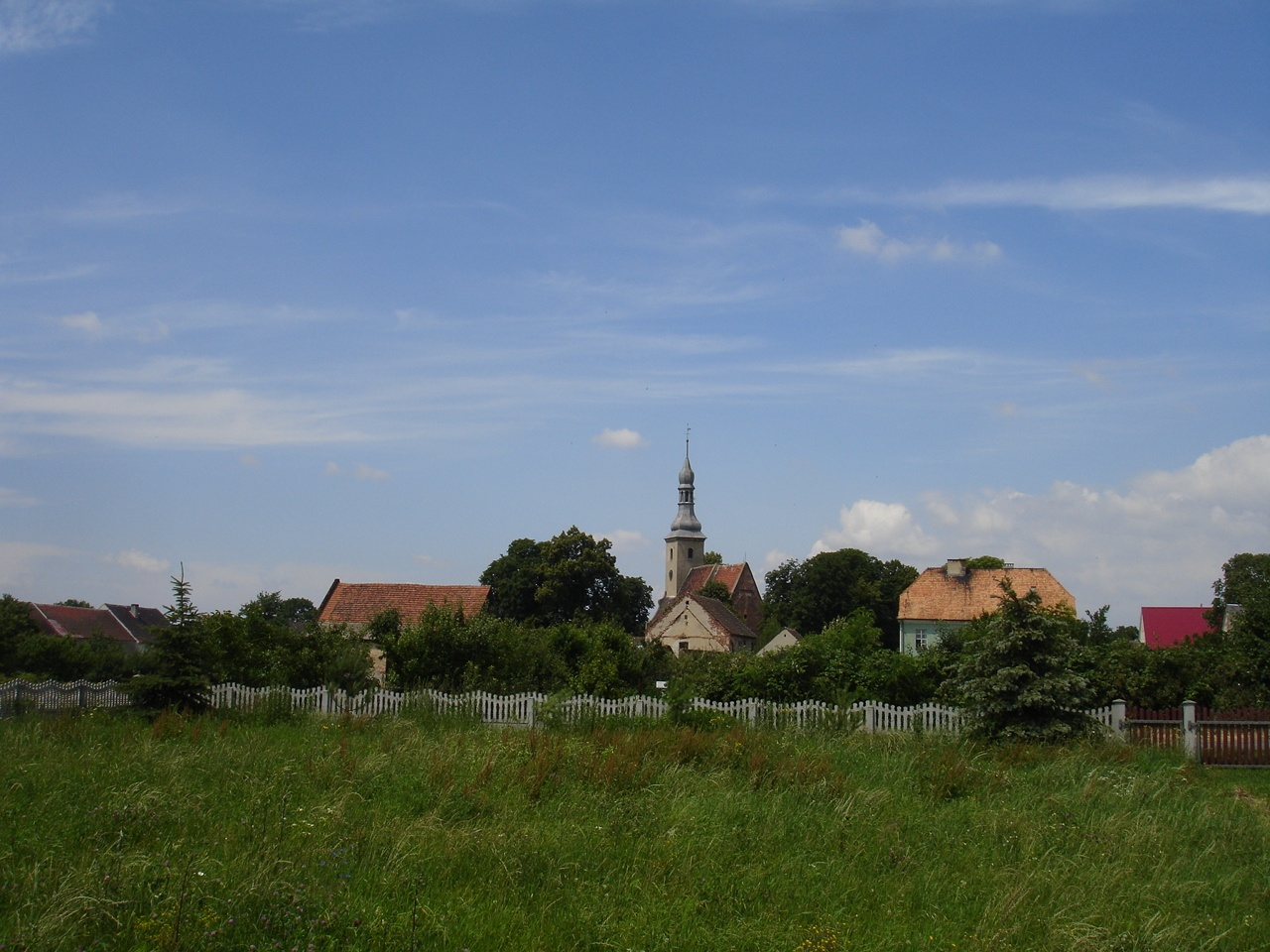
- Panoramic view of Czeska Wieś

- Location within Poland
- Coordinates: 50°45′0″N 17°29′0″E
- Country: Poland
- Voivodeship: Opole
- County: Brzeski
- Gmina: Olszanka
- Population (2006): 440
- Time zone: UTC+1 (CET)
  - Summer (DST): UTC+2 (CEST)
- Postal Code: 49-332 Olszanka
- Area code: +48(0-77)...
- Car plates: OB
- Website: http://www.olszanka.pl

Czeska Wieś [ˈt͡ʂɛska ˈvjɛɕ] (German: Böhmischdorf) is a village in Poland situated in Opole Voivodeship, in Brzeg County, in Gmina Olszanka.

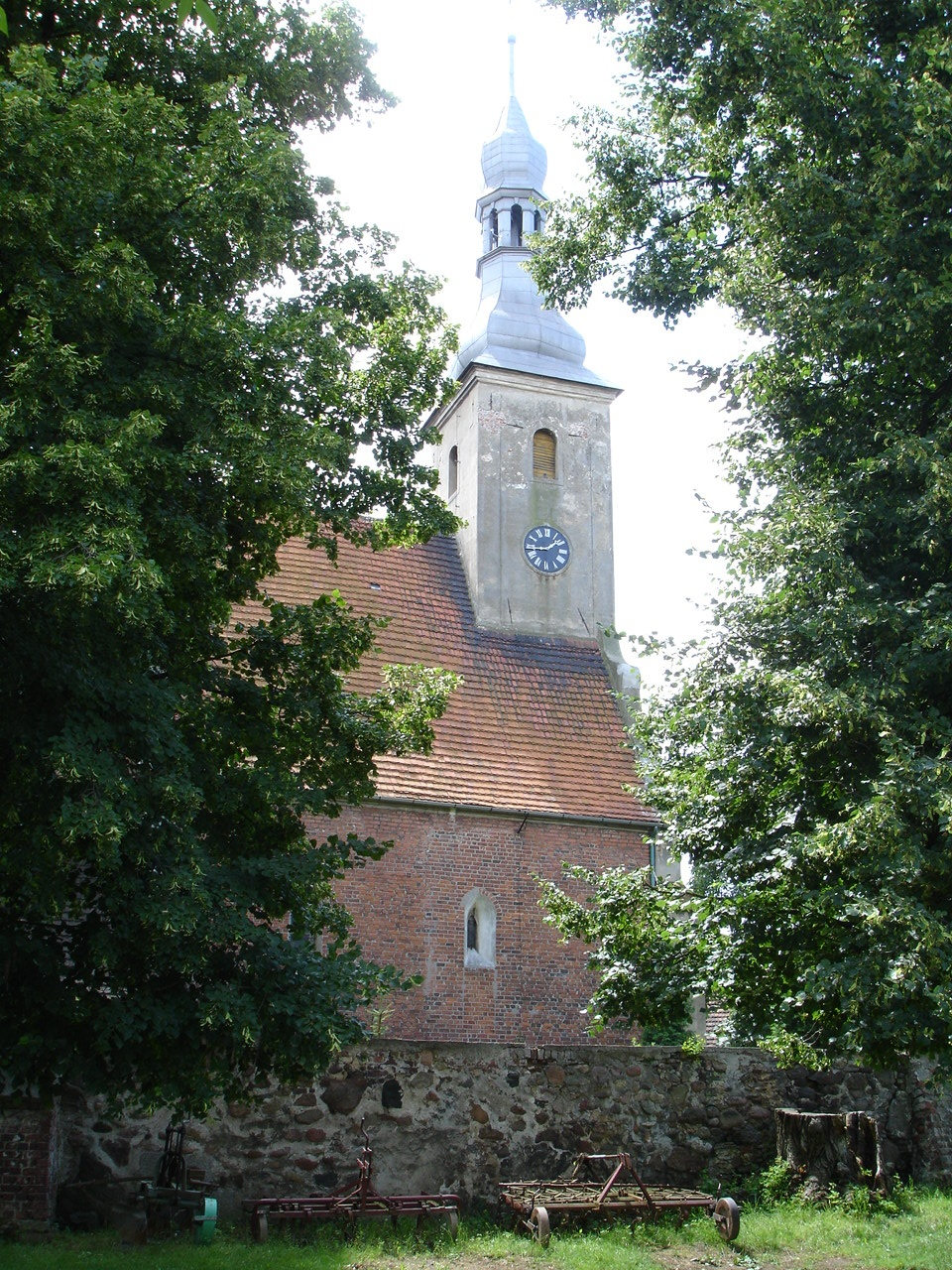
Church of the Sacred Heart of Lord Jesus (polish: Kościół Najświętszego Serca Pana Jezusa

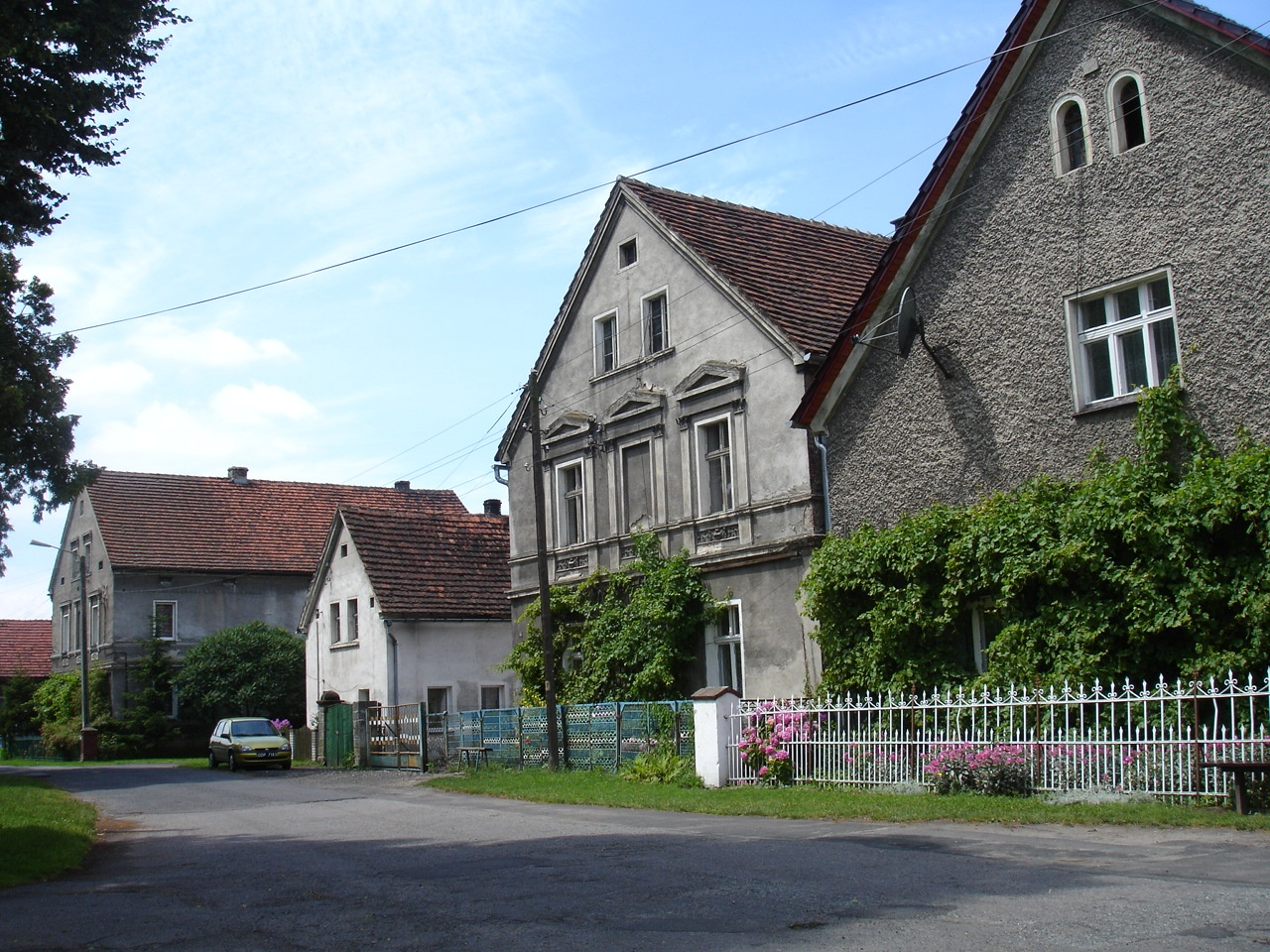
Buildings in Czeska Wieś
