= Victoria Despaigne =

Cuban athlete

Personal information
- Full name: Victoria Hildelisa Despaigne
- Nationality: Cuban
- Born: 23 December 1957 (age 67)

Sport
- Sport: Track and field
- Event(s): Heptathlon, high jump, long jump

Victoria Hildelisa Despaigne (born 23 December 1957) is a retired Cuban heptathlete, high jumper, and long jumper.

In the heptathlon, Despaigne won the silver medal at the 1981 Central American and Caribbean Championships, the silver medal at the 1982 Central American and Caribbean Games and the gold medals at the 1983, 1985 and 1987 Central American and Caribbean Championships.

In the high jump, Despaigne won the bronze medal at the 1983 Ibero-American Championships, the gold medal at the 1983 Central American and Caribbean Championships, and the bronze medal at the 1987 Central American and Caribbean Championships. In the long jump, she won the bronze medal at the 1985 Central American and Caribbean Championships.

== International competitions ==
Year	Competition	Venue	Position	Event	Notes
Representing Cuba
1981	Central American and Caribbean Championships	Santo Domingo, Dominican Republic	3rd	Heptathlon	4844 pts
1982	Central American and Caribbean Games	Havana, Cuba	2nd	Heptathlon	5210 pts
1983	Central American and Caribbean Championships	Havana, Cuba	1st	High jump	1.78 m
1983	Central American and Caribbean Championships	Havana, Cuba	1st	Heptathlon	5469 pts
1983	Pan American Games	Caracas, Venezuela	–	High jump	NM
1983	Pan American Games	Caracas, Venezuela	5th	Heptathlon	4595 pts
1983	Ibero-American Championships	Barcelona, Spain	1st	4 × 400 m relay	3:38.94 min
1983	Ibero-American Championships	Barcelona, Spain	1st	High jump	57.60 m
1984	Friendship Games	Prague, Czechoslovakia	7th	Heptathlon	5973 pts
1985	Central American and Caribbean Championships	Nassau, Bahamas	3rd	Long jump	5.97 m
1985	Central American and Caribbean Championships	Nassau, Bahamas	1st	Heptathlon	5323 pts
1986	Central American and Caribbean Games	Santiago, Dominican Republic	1st	Heptathlon	DNF
1987	Central American and Caribbean Championships	Caracas, Venezuela	3rd	High jump	1.78 m
1987	Central American and Caribbean Championships	Caracas, Venezuela	1st	Heptathlon	5514 pts
1987	Pan American Games	Indianapolis, United States	5th	Heptathlon	5371 pts
