= Orlane dos Santos =

Brazilian high jumper (born 1966)

Personal information
- Full name: Orlane Maria Lima dos Santos
- Born: December 9, 1966 (age 59)
- Years active: 1983–2001

Sport
- Sport: Athletics
- Events: High jump, heptathlon

Orlane Maria Lima dos Santos (born 9 December 1966) is a retired Brazilian athlete who specialised in the high jump. She represented her country at three outdoor and two indoors World Championships. She also sometimes competed in the heptathlon.

Her personal bests in high jump are 1.92 metres outdoors (Bogota 1989) and 1.90 metres indoors (Wuppertal 1992). As of 2023, both are standing national records.

== International competitions ==
Year	Competition	Venue	Position	Event	Notes
Representing Brazil
1983	South American Junior Championships	Medellín, Colombia	1st	High jump	1.75 m
1983	South American Junior Championships	Medellín, Colombia	1st	Heptathlon	5461 pts
1983	Pan American Games	Caracas, Venezuela	4th	High jump	1.76 m
1983	Ibero-American Championships	Barcelona, Spain	1st	High jump	1.80 m
1983	South American Championships	Santa Fe, Argentina	3rd	100 m hurdles	14.4 s
1983	South American Championships	Santa Fe, Argentina	1st	High jump	1.80 m
1983	South American Championships	Santa Fe, Argentina	3rd	Long jump	5.79 m
1984	Pan American Junior Championships	Nassau, Bahamas	3rd	4 × 100 m	49.50 s
1984	Pan American Junior Championships	Nassau, Bahamas	3rd	High jump	1.86 m
1984	Pan American Junior Championships	Nassau, Bahamas	1st	Heptathlon	5344 pts
1984	South American Junior Championships	Caracas, Venezuela	1st	High jump	1.82 m
1984	South American Junior Championships	Caracas, Venezuela	2nd	Long jump	5.87 m
1984	South American Junior Championships	Caracas, Venezuela	1st	Heptathlon	5440 pts
1985	World Indoor Games	Paris, France	12th	High jump	1.80 m
1986	Ibero-American Championships	Havana, Cuba	3rd	High jump	1.76 m
1987	Pan American Games	Indianapolis, United States	4th	High jump	1.88 m
1987	Pan American Games	Indianapolis, United States	–	Heptathlon	DNF
1987	World Championships	Rome, Italy	13th (q)	High jump	1.80 m
1987	South American Championships	São Paulo, Brazil	1st	High jump	1.80 m
1987	South American Championships	São Paulo, Brazil	3rd	Long jump	5.90 m
1988	Ibero-American Championships	Mexico City, Mexico	4th	High jump	1.80 m
1989	South American Championships	Medellín, Colombia	1st	High jump	1.85 m
1989	Universiade	Duisburg, West Germany	16th (q)	High jump	1.79 m
1990	Ibero-American Championships	Manaus, Brazil	1st	High jump	1.81 m
1990	Ibero-American Championships	Manaus, Brazil	1st	Heptathlon	5723 pts
1991	World Indoor Championships	Seville, Spain	8th	High jump	1.88 m
1991	South American Championships	Manaus, Brazil	1st	High jump	1.89 m
1991	Universiade	Sheffield, United Kingdom	5th	High jump	1.87 m
1991	Universiade	Sheffield, United Kingdom	–	Heptathlon	DNF
1991	Pan American Games	Havana, Cuba	5th	High jump	1.75 m
1991	World Championships	Tokyo, Japan	13th (q)	High jump	1.86 m
1993	South American Championships	Lima, Peru	1st	High jump	1.87 m
1993	World Championships	Stuttgart, Germany	18th (q)	High jump	1.87 m
1994	Ibero-American Championships	Mar del Plata, Argentina	3rd	High jump	1.75 m
1995	South American Championships	Manaus, Brazil	1st	High jump	1.80 m
1996	Ibero-American Championships	Medellín, Colombia	1st	High jump	1.86 m
1997	South American Championships	Mar del Plata, Argentina	2nd	High jump	1.83 m
