= Athletics at the 1995 Pan American Games – Women's high jump =

Women's high jump at the Pan American Games

The women's high jump event at the 1995 Pan American Games was held at the Estadio Atletico "Justo Roman" on 22 March.

== Results ==
Rank	Name	Nationality	1.65	1.70	1.75	1.80	1.85	1.88	1.91	1.94	1.97	Result	Notes
1st place, gold medalist(s)	Ioamnet Quintero	Cuba	–	–	o	o	o	o	o	o	xxx	1.94	
2nd place, silver medalist(s)	Silvia Costa	Cuba	–	–	o	xo	o	o	xo	xxx		1.91	
3rd place, bronze medalist(s)	Angie Bradburn	United States	–	–	–	o	xxo	o	xo	xxx		1.91	
4	Karol Damon	United States	–	–	o	xo	xo	xxo	xxx			1.88	
5	Natasha Alleyne	Trinidad and Tobago	–	–	o	o	o	xxx				1.85	
6	Sara McGladdery	Canada	o	o	o	xxx						1.75	
7	Solange Witteveen	Argentina	o	o	xxo	xxx						1.75	
8	Claudia Casals	Argentina	o	o	xxx							1.70	
	Karol Jenkins	United States										DNS	
