= 1984 European Athletics Indoor Championships – Women's high jump =

The women's high jump event at the 1984 European Athletics Indoor Championships was held on 4 March.

== Results ==
Rank	Name	Nationality	1.75	1.80	1.85	1.89	1.92	1.95	1.97	Result	Notes
1st place, gold medalist(s)	Ulrike Meyfarth	West Germany		o	o	o	xo	o	xxx	1.95	
2nd place, silver medalist(s)	Maryse Éwanjé-Épée	France		xo	–	xo	xo	o	xxx	1.95	
3rd place, bronze medalist(s)	Danuta Bułkowska	Poland		o	o	o	o	xo	xxx	1.95	NR
4	Chris Soetewey	Belgium								1.92	
5	Tamara Malešev	Yugoslavia								1.92	NR
6	Brigitte Holzapfel	West Germany								1.92	
7	Jolanta Komsa	Poland								1.92	
8	Marina Doronina	Soviet Union								1.85	
9	Ivana Jobbová	Czechoslovakia								1.80	
10	Andrea Breder	West Germany								1.80	
11	Stefka Kostadinova	Bulgaria								1.75	
