= Ioamnet Quintero =

Cuban high jumper (born 1972)

Personal information
- Full name: Ioamnet Quintero Alvarez
- Born: September 8, 1972 (age 53) Havana, Cuba
Medal record
Women's athletics
Representing Cuba
Olympic Games
Bronze medal – third place	1992 Barcelona	High jump
World Championships
Gold medal – first place	1993 Stuttgart	High jump
World Cup
Gold medal – first place	1992 Havana	High jump
Pan American Games
Gold medal – first place	1991 Havana	High jump
Gold medal – first place	1995 Mar del Plata	High jump

Ioamnet Quintero Alvarez (Note: In this Spanish name, the first or paternal surname is Quintero and the second or maternal family name is Alvarez.) (born September 8, 1972, in Havana, Cuba) is a former high jumper from Cuba.

== Biography ==
She won the bronze medal in the women's high jump contest at the 1992 Summer Olympics and also competed at the 1996 and 2000 games. She won a gold medal at the 1993 World Championships in Athletics.

== International competitions ==
Year	Competition	Venue	Position	Event	Notes
Representing Cuba
1988	Central American and Caribbean Junior Championships (U-20)	Nassau, Bahamas	2nd	High jump	1.78 m
1988	Central American and Caribbean Junior Championships (U-20)	Nassau, Bahamas	5th	Long jump	5.42 m
1990	Central American and Caribbean Junior Championships (U-20)	Havana, Cuba	1st	High jump	1.85 m
1990	World Junior Championships	Plovdiv, Bulgaria	4th	High jump	1.85 m
1991	Pan American Games	Havana, Cuba	1st	High jump	1.88 m
1992	Ibero-American Championships	Seville, Spain	1st	High jump	1.98 m CR
1992	Olympic Games	Barcelona, Spain	3rd	High jump	1.97 m
1992	World Cup	Havana, Cuba	1st	High jump	1.94 m (Note: Representing the Americas)
1993	World Indoor Championships	Toronto, Canada	6th	High jump	1.97 m
1993	World Championships	Stuttgart, Germany	1st	High jump	1.99 m
1994	Goodwill Games	St. Petersburg, Russia	4th	High jump	1.91 m
1995	World Indoor Championships	Barcelona, Spain	23rd (q)	High jump	1.80 m
1995	Pan American Games	Mar del Plata, Argentina	1st	High jump	1.94 m
1995	World Championships	Gothenburg, Sweden	18th (q)	High jump	1.90 m
1996	Olympic Games	Atlanta, United States	17th (q)	High jump	1.90 m
1997	World Indoor Championships	Paris, France	5th	High jump	1.95 m
2000	Olympic Games	Sydney, Australia	14th (q)	High jump	1.92 m

== See also ==
- Female two metres club
