= 1985 IAAF World Indoor Games – Women's high jump =

The women's high jump event at the 1985 IAAF World Indoor Games was held at the Palais Omnisports Paris-Bercy on 19 January.

== Results ==
| Rank | Name | Nationality | 1.75 | 1.80 | 1.85 | 1.90 | 1.94 | 1.97 | 2.04 | Result | Notes |
|---|---|---|---|---|---|---|---|---|---|---|---|
| 1st place, gold medalist(s) | Stefka Kostadinova | Bulgaria | – | o | o | o | o | o | xxx | 1.97 | NR |
| 2nd place, silver medalist(s) | Susanne Lorentzon | Sweden | o | o | o | xo | o | xxx | | 1.94 | NR |
| 3rd place, bronze medalist(s) | Debbie Brill | Canada | o | o | o | o | xxx | | | 1.90 | |
| 3rd place, bronze medalist(s) | Silvia Costa | Cuba | – | o | o | o | xxx | | | 1.90 | |
| 3rd place, bronze medalist(s) | Danuta Bułkowska | Poland | – | o | o | o | xxx | | | 1.90 | |
| 6 | Marina Doronina | Soviet Union | o | xo | o | xxo | xxx | | | 1.90 | |
| 7 | Chris Soetewey | Belgium | o | o | o | xxx | | | | 1.85 | |
| 8 | Jolanta Komsa | Poland | – | o | xo | xxx | | | | 1.85 | |
| 9 | Madely Beaugendre | France | o | o | xxo | xxx | | | | 1.85 | |
| 9 | Olga Turchak | Soviet Union | – | o | xxo | xxx | | | | 1.85 | |
| 11 | Katrena Johnson | United States | o | o | xxx | | | | | 1.80 | |
| 12 | Orlane dos Santos | Brazil | o | xo | xxx | | | | | 1.80 | |
| 13 | Diana Davies | Great Britain | xo | xxo | xxx | | | | | 1.80 | |
| 14 | Ni Xiuling | China | o | xxx | | | | | | 1.75 | |
| 15 | Deanne Bopf | Australia | xo | xxx | | | | | | 1.75 | |
| 16 | Marianne Vikne | Norway | xxo | xxx | | | | | | 1.75 | |
