= Athletics at the 1991 Pan American Games – Women's high jump =

Women's high jump at the Pan American Games

The women's high jump event at the 1991 Pan American Games was held in Havana, Cuba on 5 August.

== Results ==
Rank	Name	Nationality	1.65	1.70	1.75	1.80	1.85	1.88	1.94	Result	Notes
1st place, gold medalist(s)	Ioamnet Quintero	Cuba	–	o	o	o	o	o	xxx	1.88	
2nd place, silver medalist(s)	María del Carmen García	Cuba	–	o	o	xo	o	xxx		1.85	
3rd place, bronze medalist(s)	Jan Wohlschlag	United States	o	xo	o	o	xxx			1.80	
4	Tanya Hughes	United States	–	–	o	xo	xxx			1.80	
5	Cristina Fink	Mexico	–	o	o	xxx				1.75	
5	Orlane dos Santos	Brazil	–	–	o	xxx				1.75	
7	Catherine Bond-Mills	Canada	–	o	xxo	xxx				1.75	
7	Leslie Estwick	Canada	–	–	xxo	xxx				1.75	
9	Ana Quiñones	Guatemala	–	xo	xxx					1.70	
10	Leonor Carter	Chile	o	xxo	xxx					1.70	
