= Krzyżowice, Brzeg County =

Krzyżowice
- Village
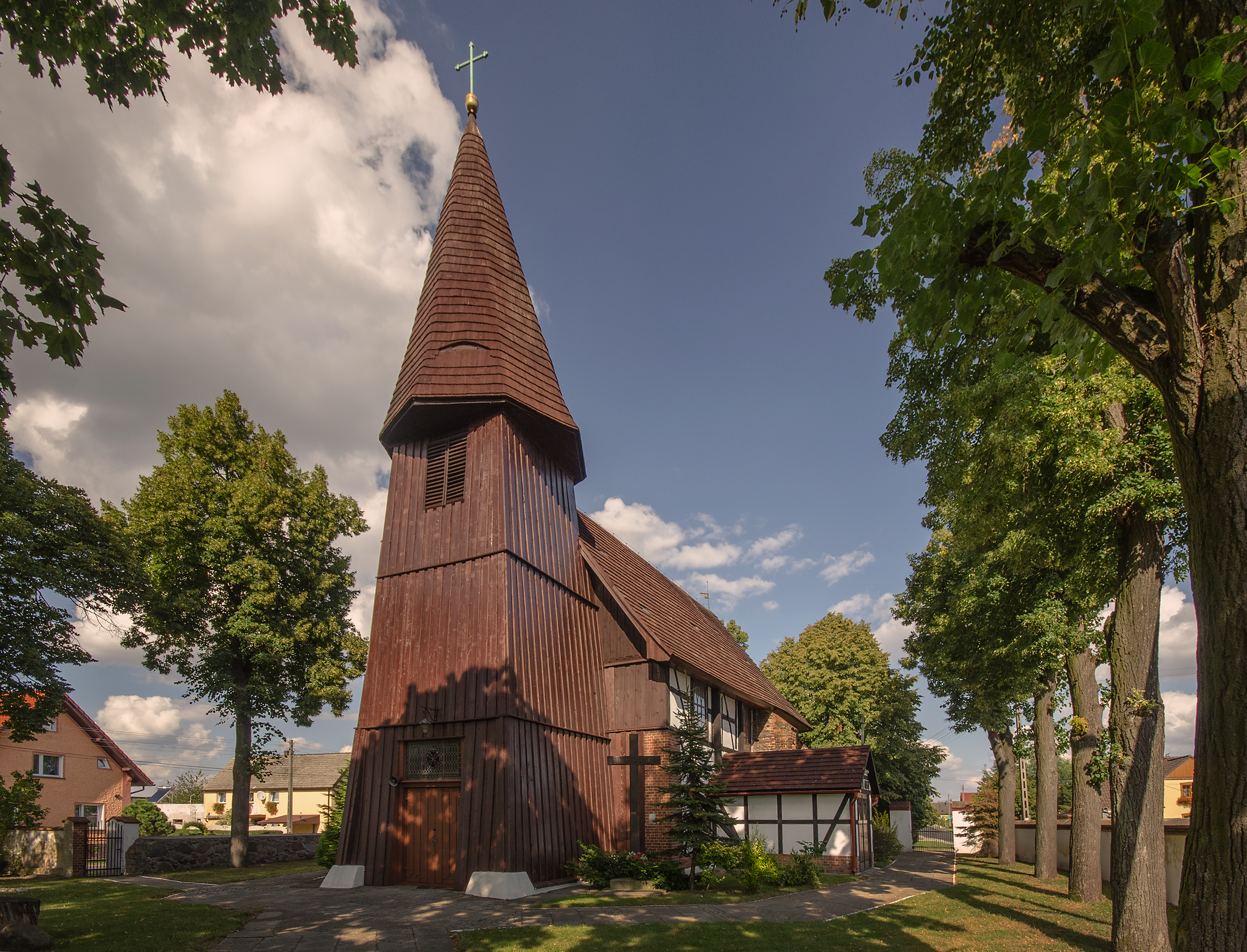
- Church of the Ascension

- Location within Poland
- Coordinates: 50°48′N 17°28′E
- Country: Poland
- Voivodeship: Opole
- County: Brzeg
- Gmina: Olszanka
- Time zone: UTC+1 (CET)
  - Summer (DST): UTC+2 (CEST)
- Vehicle registration: OB

Krzyżowice [kʂɨʐɔˈvit͡sɛ] (German Kreisewitz) is a village in the administrative district of Gmina Olszanka, within Brzeg County, Opole Voivodeship, in south-western Poland.

The name of the village is of Polish origin and comes from the word krzyż, which means "cross".

== Notable residents ==
- Moritz Karl Ernst von Prittwitz (1795–1885), Prussian Lieutenant-General
