= Brzeg water tower =

- Wieża ciśnień w Brzegu
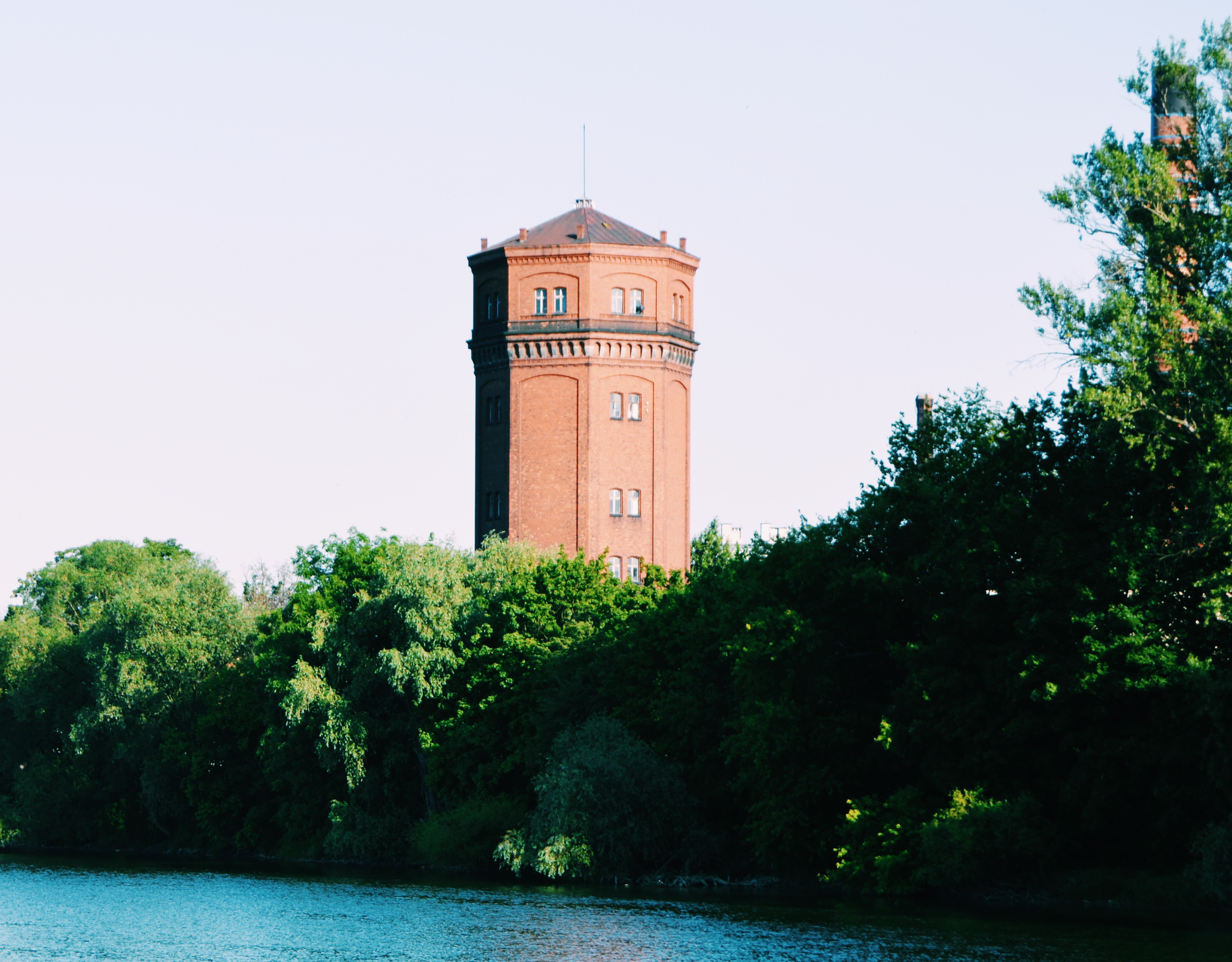
- Brzeg water tower

General information
- Type: Water tower
- Architectural style: Industrial
- Location: Brzeg, Poland
- Completed: 1864

Brzeg water tower - a historic water tower in the town of Brzeg, Opole Voivodeship, Poland.

When the oldest waterworks for the town of Brzeg (Brieg), built in the second half of the nineteenth-century was not sufficient for the town's populous, in 1864, the town authorities set out to build a new water tower which was completed in the latter part of the aforesaid year. Initially, water was taken from the Oder River, however, due to noted frequent epidemics, a waterworks was built in Gierszowice to supply the water tower.
