= Michałów, Opole Voivodeship =

Michałów
- Village
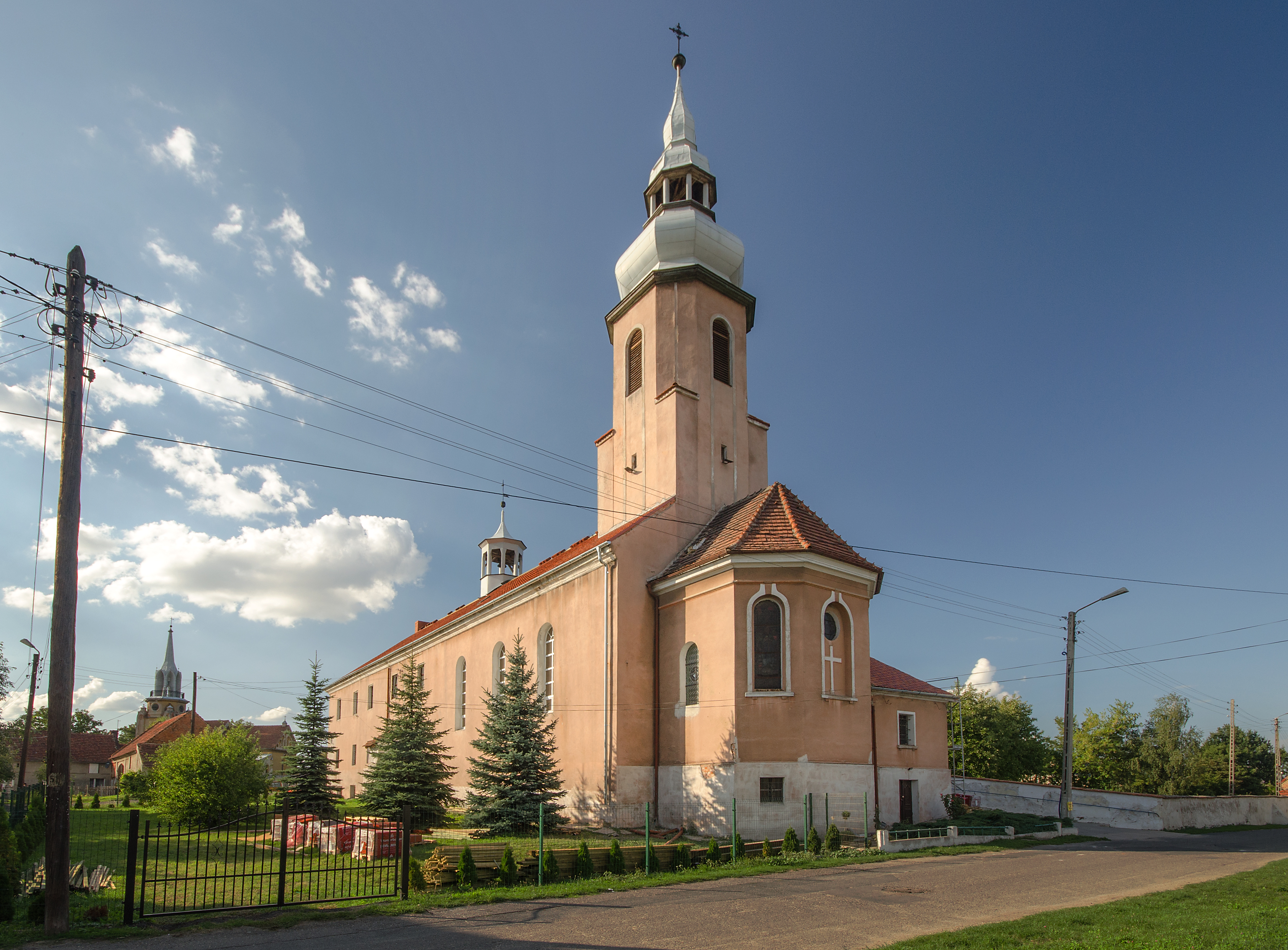
- Catholic church

- Location within Poland
- Coordinates: 50°44′N 17°30′E
- Country: Poland
- Voivodeship: Opole
- County: Brzeg
- Gmina: Olszanka
- Population: 550

Michałów [miˈxawuf] is a village in the administrative district of Gmina Olszanka, within Brzeg County, Opole Voivodeship, in south-western Poland.
