= Gmina Olszanka, Opole Voivodeship =

Gmina Olszanka Olszanka Commune
- Gmina
- Flag Coat of arms
- Interactive map of Gmina Olszanka
- Coordinates (Olszanka): 50°47′N 17°29′E
- Country: Poland
- Voivodeship: Opole
- County: Brzeg
- Seat: Olszanka

Area
  - Total: 92.61 km^{2} (35.76 sq mi)

Population (2019-06-30)
  - Total: 4,906
  - Density: 52.97/km^{2} (137.2/sq mi)
- Website: http://olszanka.pl

Gmina Olszanka is a rural gmina (administrative district) in Brzeg County, Opole Voivodeship, in south-western Poland. Its seat is the village of Olszanka, which lies approximately 10 kilometres (6 mi) south of Brzeg and 35 km (22 mi) west of the regional capital Opole.

The gmina covers an area of 92.61 square kilometres (35.8 sq mi), and as of 2019 its total population is 4,906.

== Villages ==
Gmina Olszanka contains the villages and settlements of Czeska Wieś, Gierszowice, Jankowice Wielkie, Janów, Krzyżowice, Michałów, Obórki, Olszanka, Pogorzela and Przylesie.

== Neighbouring gminas ==
Gmina Olszanka is bordered by the gminas of Grodków, Lewin Brzeski, Niemodlin, Skarbimierz and Wiązów.
