= Yang Wenqin =

Chinese high jumper

Personal information
- Born: April 30, 1960 (age 66) Shanghai, China
Medal record
Women's Athletics
Representing China
Asian Games
Bronze medal – third place	1978 Bangkok	High jump
Bronze medal – third place	1982 New Delhi	High jump
Asian Championships
Gold medal – first place	1985 Jakarta	High jump

Yang Wenqin (simplified Chinese: 杨文琴; traditional Chinese: 楊文琴; pinyin: Yáng Wénqín; born April 30, 1960) is a retired Chinese high jumper.

In 1983 she reached the final of the 1983 World Championships in Athletics, but finished 16th and third to last with only 1.84 metres.

On the regional level she took a gold medal at the Asian Championships in 1985; in addition she won bronze medals at the 1978 and 1982 Asian Games. Both contests were won by fellow Chinese person Zheng Dazhen.
