= Bonfiglioli Group =

Italian manufacturing company

- Bonfiglioli Group logo
- Native name: Bonfiglioli Riduttori S.p.A.
- Formerly: Costruzioni Meccaniche Bonfiglioli
- Company type: S.p.A.
- Industry: Power transmission components manufacturer
- Founded: April 16, 1956; 70 years ago in Bologna, Italy
- Founder: Clementino Bonfiglioli
- Headquarters: Calderara di Reno, Italy
- Area served: 5 continents, 80 countries
- Products: Bonfiglioli Riduttori; Bonfiglioli Trasmital; Bonfiglioli Vectron; Tecnoingranaggi; Bonfiglioli Vectron
- Number of employees: 5000
- Website: www.bonfiglioli.com

Bonfiglioli Group (S.p.A.) is an Italian worldwide power transmission components manufacturer company.

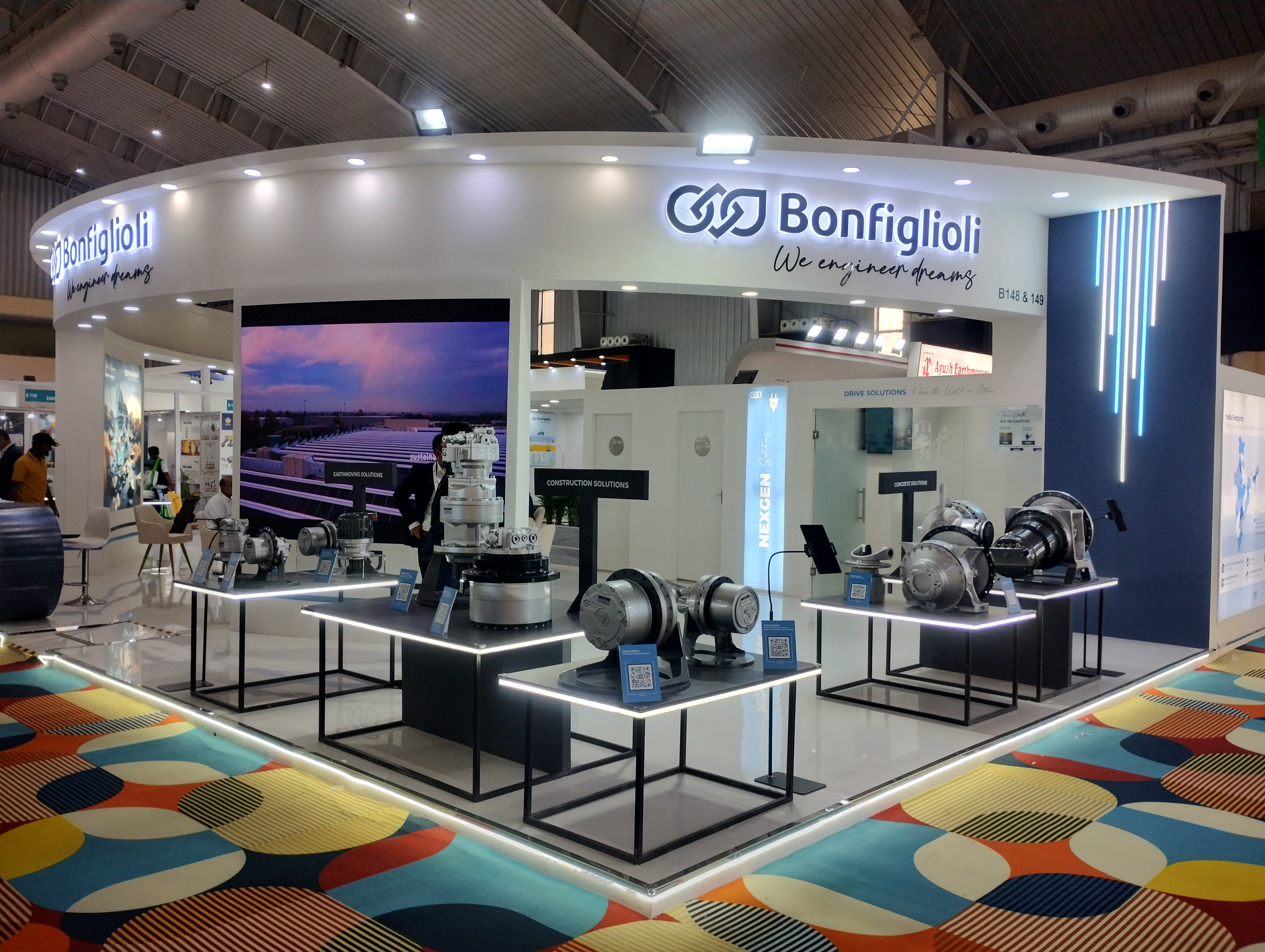
Bonfiglioli at EXCON 2025, BIEC
