= Jin Ling (athlete) =

Chinese high jumper

Personal information
- Nationality: Chinese
- Born: 25 January 1967 (age 59)

Sport
- Sport: Athletics
- Event: High jump
Medal record
Women's athletics
Representing China
Asian Games
Silver medal – second place	1998 Bangkok	High jump
Summer Universiade
Bronze medal – third place	1989 Duisburg	High jump
Asian Championships
Gold medal – first place	1989 New Delhi	High jump
Bronze medal – third place	1998 Fukuoka	High jump

Jin Ling (born 25 January 1967) is a Chinese athlete. She competed in the women's high jump at the 1988 Summer Olympics.
