= Alessandra Bonfiglioli =

Italian high jumper

Personal information
- Nationality: Italian
- Born: 5 December 1963 (age 62)

Sport
- Country: Italy
- Sport: Athletics
- Event: High jump

Achievements and titles
- Personal bests: High jump outdoor: 1.88 m (1983); High jump indoor: 1.86 m (1983)

Alessandra Bonfiglioli (born 5 December 1963) is an Italian female retired high jumper, which participated at the 1987 World Championships in Athletics.

== Achievements ==
Year	Competition	Venue	Position	Event	Performance	Notes
1987	World Championships	(Italy) Rome	Qual.	High jump	1.85 m	
