= Olszanka, Opole Voivodeship =

Olszanka
- Village
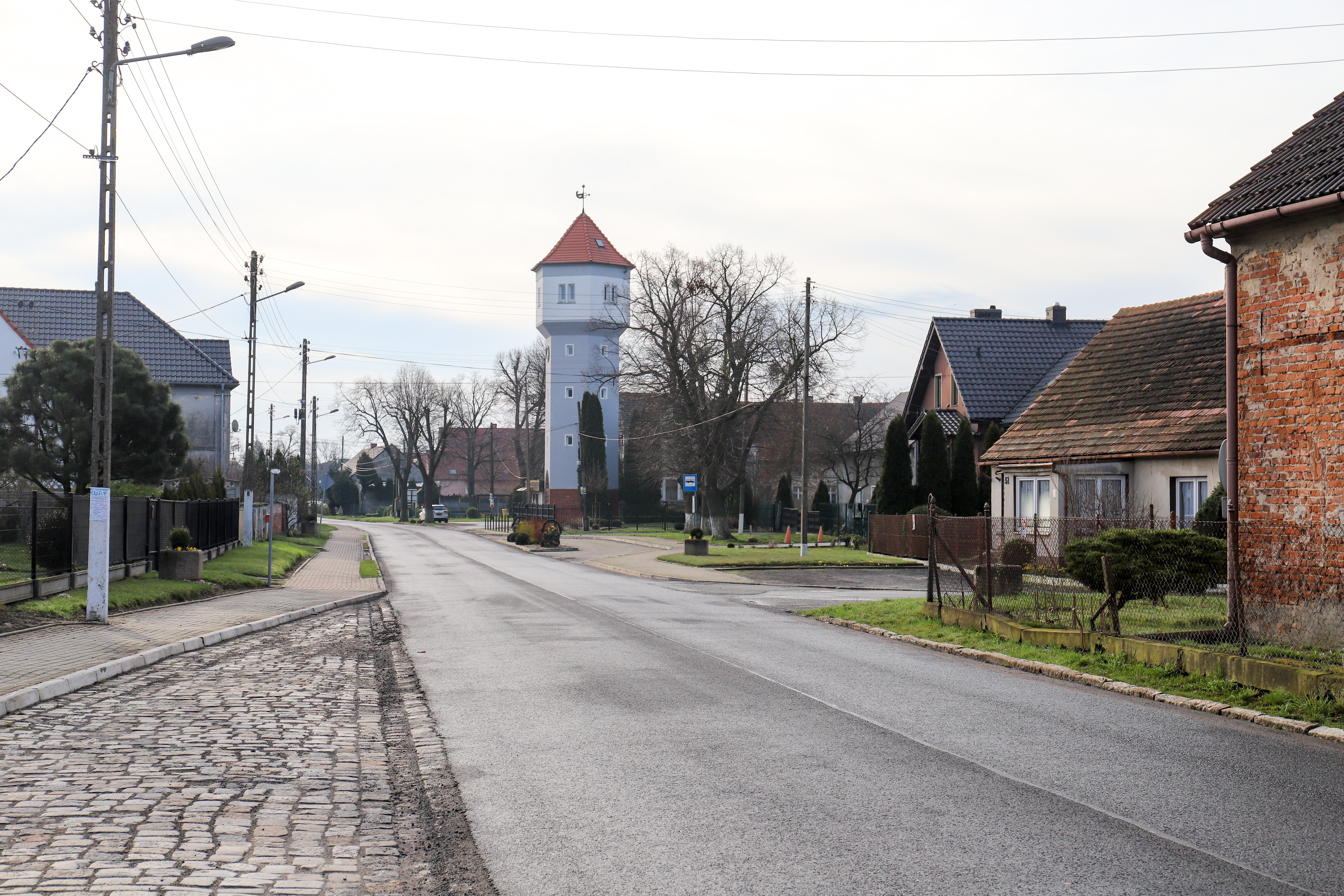

- Location within Poland
- Coordinates: 50°47′N 17°29′E
- Country: Poland
- Voivodeship: Opole
- County: Brzeg
- Gmina: Olszanka
- Time zone: UTC+1 (CET)
  - Summer (DST): UTC+2 (CEST)
- Vehicle registration: OB

Olszanka [ɔlˈʂanka] is a village in Brzeg County, Opole Voivodeship, in south-western Poland. It is the seat of the gmina (administrative district) called Gmina Olszanka.
