= 1974 European Athletics Indoor Championships – Men's high jump =

The men's high jump event at the 1974 European Athletics Indoor Championships was held on 9 March in Gothenburg.

== Results ==
Rank	Name	Nationality	Result	Notes
1st place, gold medalist(s)	Kęstutis Šapka	Soviet Union	2.22	
2nd place, silver medalist(s)	István Major	Hungary	2.20	
3rd place, bronze medalist(s)	Vladimír Malý	Czechoslovakia	2.17	
4	Jesper Tørring	Denmark	2.17	
5	Enzo Del Forno	Italy	2.17	
6	Vladimir Abramov	Soviet Union	2.17	
7	Rune Almén	Sweden	2.17	
8	Walter Boller	West Germany	2.17	
9	Jan Dahlgren	Sweden	2.14	
10	Odysseus Papatolis	Greece	2.14	
11	Ingemar Nyman	Sweden	2.14	
12	Henri Elliott	France	2.14	
13	Giordano Ferrari	Italy	2.14	
14	Valentin Gavrilov	Soviet Union	2.14	
15	Rolf Beilschmidt	East Germany	2.14	
16	Endre Kelemen	Hungary	2.10	
17	Șerban Ioan	Romania	2.10	
18	Martí Perarnau	Spain	2.10	
19	Dimitrios Patronis	Greece	2.05	
20	Vasilios Papadimitriou	Greece	2.05	
21	Leif Roar Falkum	Norway	2.05	
22	Paul De Preter	Belgium	2.05	
23	Jim Fanning	Ireland	1.90	
