= 1974 European Athletics Championships – Men's high jump =

Men's high jump at the European Athletics Championships

The men's high jump at the 1974 European Athletics Championships was held in Rome, Italy, at Stadio Olimpico on 3 and 4 September 1974.

== Medalists ==
Gold	Jesper Tørring; Denmark
Silver	Kęstutis Šapka; Soviet Union
Bronze	Vladimír Malý; Czechoslovakia

== Results ==
=== Final ===
4 September

Rank	Name	Nationality	Result	Notes
1st place, gold medalist(s)	Jesper Tørring	Denmark	2.25	CR NR
2nd place, silver medalist(s)	Kęstutis Šapka	Soviet Union	2.25	
3rd place, bronze medalist(s)	Vladimír Malý	Czechoslovakia	2.19	
4	István Major	Hungary	2.19	
5	Jacek Wszoła	Poland	2.19	
6	Leif Roar Falkum	Norway	2.16	
7	Rodolfo Bergamo	Italy	2.16	
8	Bruno Brokken	Belgium	2.13	
9	Dimitrios Patronis	Greece	2.13	
10	Asko Pesonen	Finland	2.10	
10	Giordano Ferrari	Italy	2.10	
12	Vladimir Abramov	Soviet Union	2.10	
13	Robert Sainte-Rose	France	2.10	
14	Guy Moreau	Belgium	2.00	

=== Qualification ===
3 September

Rank	Name	Nationality	Result	Notes
	Kęstutis Šapka	Soviet Union	2.14	Q
	István Major	Hungary	2.14	Q
	Vladimir Abramov	Soviet Union	2.14	Q
	Jesper Tørring	Denmark	2.14	Q
	Asko Pesonen	Finland	2.14	Q
	Rodolfo Bergamo	Italy	2.14	Q
	Jacek Wszoła	Poland	2.14	Q
	Vladimír Malý	Czechoslovakia	2.14	Q
	Leif Roar Falkum	Norway	2.14	Q
	Bruno Brokken	Belgium	2.14	Q
	Dimitrios Patronis	Greece	2.14	Q
	Robert Sainte-Rose	France	2.14	Q
	Giordano Ferrari	Italy	2.14	Q
	Guy Moreau	Belgium	2.14	Q
	Vasilios Papadimitriou	Greece	2.11	
	Frank Bonnet	France	2.11	
	Peter Szorad	Hungary	2.11	
	Stanislav Molotilov	Soviet Union	2.11	
	Endre Kelemen	Hungary	2.11	
	Paul De Preter	Belgium	2.11	
	Roman Moravec	Czechoslovakia	2.11	
	Gustavo Marqueta	Spain	2.11	
	Walter Boller	West Germany	2.11	
	Ingemar Nyman	Sweden	2.11	
	Martí Perarnau	Spain	2.08	
	Paul Poaniewa	France	2.08	
	Enzo del Forno	Italy	2.08	
	Rune Almen	Sweden	2.08	
	Daniel Temin	Yugoslavia	2.05	
	Janusz Wrzosek	Poland	2.05	
	Șerban Ioan	Romania	DNS	
	Peter Märchi	Switzerland	DNS	

== Participation ==
According to an unofficial count, 30 athletes from 15 countries participated in the event.

- Belgium (3)
- Czechoslovakia (2)
- Denmark (1)
- Finland (1)
- France (3)
- Greece (2)
- Hungary (3)
- Italy (3)
- Norway (1)
- Poland (2)
- Soviet Union (3)
- Spain (2)
- Sweden (2)
- West Germany (1)
- Yugoslavia (1)
