= Athletics at the 1976 Summer Olympics – Men's high jump =

Men's high jump at the Games of the XXI Olympiad
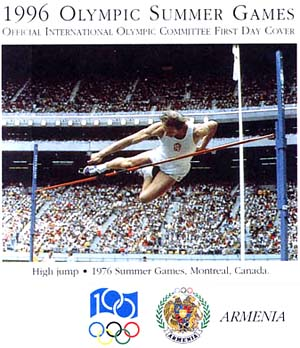
- 1996 Armenian stamp commemorating 1976 high jump, depicting Jacek Wszoła
- Venue: Olympic Stadium
- Dates: July 30 and 31, 1976
- Competitors: 37 from 23 nations
- Winning height: 2.25 OR

Medalists
1st place, gold medalist(s)		Jacek Wszoła; Poland
2nd place, silver medalist(s)		Greg Joy; Canada
3rd place, bronze medalist(s)		Dwight Stones; United States

The men's high jump at the 1976 Summer Olympics took place on July 30 and 31 at the Olympic Stadium in Montreal, Canada. Thirty-seven athletes from 23 nations competed. The maximum number of athletes per nation had been set at 3 since the 1930 Olympic Congress. The event was won by Jacek Wszoła of Poland, breaking the US/USSR hold on the men's high jump title (no nation other than those two had won since 1948). It was Poland's first medal in the event. Greg Joy's silver was Canada's first medal in the event since 1932. Dwight Stones won his second consecutive bronze medal, becoming the third man to win multiple medals in the high jump and keeping the United States' streak of podium appearances (all 18 editions of the Olympic men's high jump) alive one final time. The Soviet streak of five Games with podium appearances in the event ended.

== Background ==
This was the 18th appearance of the event, which is one of 12 athletics events to have been held at every Summer Olympics. The returning finalists from the 1972 Games were bronze medalist Dwight Stones of the United States and sixth-place finisher István Major of Hungary; the defending champion, Soviet Jüri Tarmak, had retired. Stones was now the best jumper in the world, having broken the world record twice since the previous Games. Jesper Tørring of Denmark, the 1974 European champion, was also competing.

Bermuda, Cuba, Nicaragua, and Saudi Arabia each made their debut in the event. The United States appeared for the 18th time, having competed at each edition of the Olympic men's high jump to that point.

== Competition format ==
The competition used the two-round format introduced in 1912. There were two distinct rounds of jumping with results cleared between rounds. Jumpers were eliminated if they had three consecutive failures, whether at a single height or between multiple heights if they attempted to advance before clearing a height.

The qualifying round had the bar set at 2.00 metres, 2.05 metres, 2.10 metres, 2.13 metres, and 2.16 metres. All jumpers clearing 2.16 metres in the qualifying round advanced to the final. If fewer than 12 jumpers could achieve it, the top 12 (including ties) would advance to the final.

The final had jumps at 2.00 metres, 2.05 metres, 2.10 metres, 2.14 metres, 2.18 metres, 2.21 metres, and every 0.02 metres after that until there was a winner.

== Records ==
Prior to this competition, the existing world and Olympic records were as follows.

World record	Dwight Stones (USA)	2.31	Philadelphia, United States	5 June 1976
Olympic record	Dick Fosbury (USA)	2.24	Mexico City, Mexico	20 October 1968

Jacek Wszoła beat the Olympic record by jumping 2.25 metres.

== Schedule ==
All times are Eastern Daylight Time (UTC-4)

Date	Time	Round
Friday, 30 July 1976	10:00	Qualifying
Saturday, 31 July 1976	16:30	Final

== Results ==
Key

- o = Height cleared
- x = Height failed
- – = Height passed
- r = Retired
- SB = Season's best
- PB = Personal best
- NR = National record
- AR = Area record
- OR = Olympic record
- WR = World record
- WL = World lead
- NM = No mark
- DNS = Did not start
- DQ = Disqualified

=== Qualifying ===
The qualification was set to 2.16 metres. A total of 14 athletes achieved this height.

Rank	Group	Athlete	Nation	2.00	2.05	2.10	2.13	2.16	Height	Note
1	A	Jacek Wszoła	Poland	—	—	o	o	o	2.16	Q
1	A	Jim Barrineau	United States	—	—	o	o	o	2.16	Q
3	A	Serhiy Senyukov	Soviet Union	—	o	o	o	o	2.16	Q
3	B	Bill Jankunis	United States	—	o	o	o	o	2.16	Q
5	A	Rolf Beilschmidt	East Germany	o	o	o	o	o	2.16	Q
5	A	Sergey Budalov	Soviet Union	o	o	o	o	o	2.16	Q
7	B	Leif Roar Falkum	Norway	—	o	o	xo	o	2.16	Q
8	B	Terje Totland	Norway	o	o	o	xo	o	2.16	Q
9	A	Greg Joy	Canada	—	o	xo	xo	o	2.16	Q
10	A	Dwight Stones	United States	—	o	o	o	xo	2.16	Q
11	A	Claude Ferragne	Canada	xo	xo	o	o	xo	2.16	Q
12	B	Jesper Torring	Denmark	o	—	o	xo	xxo	2.16	Q
13	A	Rodolfo Bergamo	Italy	o	o	o	xo	xxo	2.16	Q
14	A	Rune Almén	Sweden	o	o	xo	xxo	xxo	2.16	Q
15	A	Endre Kelemen	Hungary	—	—	xo	o	xxx	2.13	
16	A	Guy Moreau	Belgium	—	o	xo	o	xxx	2.13	
17	A	Walter Boller	West Germany	o	xo	o	o	xxx	2.13	
17	B	Katsumi Fukura	Japan	o	o	xo	o	x	2.13	
19	B	Kazunori Koshikawa	Japan	o	o	o	xo	xxx	2.13	
20	A	Henry Lauterbach	East Germany	o	o	o	xxo	xxx	2.13	
21	A	Danial Temim	Yugoslavia	o	o	o	—	xxx	2.10	
22	A	Teymour Ghiasi	Iran	o	xo	o	xxx	—	2.10	
23	A	Wolfgang Killing	West Germany	—	o	xxx	—		2.05	
24	B	István Major	Hungary	o	o	xxx	—		2.05	
24	B	Juan Carrasco	Spain	o	o	xxx	—		2.05	
24	B	Oscar Raise	Italy	o	o	xxx	—		2.05	
24	B	Paul Poaniéwa	France	o	o	xxx	—		2.05	
28	B	Francisco Martín	Spain	—	xo	xxx	—		2.05	
29	B	Jacques Aletti	France	xo	xo	xxx	—		2.05	
29	B	Marc Romersa	Luxembourg	xo	xo	xxx	—		2.05	
29	B	Richard Spencer	Cuba	xo	xo	xxx	—		2.05	
32	A	Riccardo Fortini	Italy	o	xxo	xxx	—		2.05	
32	A	Robert Forget	Canada	o	xxo	xxx	—		2.05	
32	B	Clark Godwin	Bermuda	o	xxo	xxx	—		2.05	
—	B	Carlos Alberto Abaunza	Nicaragua	xxx	—				No mark	
—	B	Irajá Cecy	Brazil	xxx	—				No mark	
—	B	Ghazi Saleh	Saudi Arabia	xxx	—				No mark	
—	A	Bruno Brokken	Belgium	DNS						

=== Final ===
The rainy weather affected Stones more than anyone else. Two months before the Olympics, he cleared 2.31 metres; five days after the Olympic final, he cleared 2.32 metres. But in the Montreal rain, he failed three times at 2.23 metres. Home crowd hero Joy cleared that height on his final attempt, ultimately gaining silver for it. Budalov tried once unsuccessfully at 2.23 metres before moving on to try 2.25 metres (a very uncommon strategy at that point), failing twice there and settling for fourth place at 2.21 metres. Wszoła, who had not been expected to be a contender, cleared 2.23 metres in his first try. He and Joy each made one jump at 2.25 metres before taking divergent approaches: Wszoła kept at 2.25 metres, passing it on jump #2; Joy went on to 2.27 metres. Each man took two unsuccessful jumps at 2.27, eliminating Joy in second place and leaving Wszoła alone as gold medalist. He used his final attempt at 2.29, with no success.

Rank	Athlete	Nation	2.00	2.05	2.10	2.14	2.18	2.21	2.23	2.25	2.27	2.29	Height	Notes
1st place, gold medalist(s)	Jacek Wszoła	Poland	—	—	—	o	o	o	o	xo	xx–	x	2.25	OR
2nd place, silver medalist(s)	Greg Joy	Canada	o	o	o	xo	xxo	o	xxo	x–	xx	—	2.23	
3rd place, bronze medalist(s)	Dwight Stones	United States	—	—	o	o	o	o	xxx	—			2.21	
4	Sergey Budalov	Soviet Union	—	o	o	o	o	xo	x–	xx	—		2.21	
5	Serhiy Senyukov	Soviet Union	—	—	o	o	o	xxx	—				2.18	
6	Rodolfo Bergamo	Italy	o	o	o	xo	o	xxx	—				2.18	
7	Rolf Beilschmidt	East Germany	—	o	o	o	xo	xxx	—				2.18	
8	Jesper Torring	Denmark	—	—	o	xo	xo	xxx	—				2.18	
9	Terje Totland	Norway	o	o	xo	o	xo	xxx	—				2.18	
10	Rune Almén	Sweden	o	xo	xo	o	xxo	xxx	—				2.18	
11	Jim Barrineau	United States	—	—	o	o	xxx	—					2.14	
12	Claude Ferragne	Canada	—	o	o	o	xxx	—					2.14	
13	Bill Jankunis	United States	—	—	o	xxx	—						2.10	
14	Leif Roar Falkum	Norway	—	—	xo	xxx	—						2.10	
