= 1973 European Athletics Indoor Championships – Men's high jump =

The men's high jump event at the 1973 European Athletics Indoor Championships was held on 11 March in Rotterdam.

== Results ==
Rank	Name	Nationality	Result	Notes
1st place, gold medalist(s)	István Major	Hungary	2.20	
2nd place, silver medalist(s)	Jiří Palkovský	Czechoslovakia	2.20	
3rd place, bronze medalist(s)	Vasilios Papadimitriou	Greece	2.17	
4	Csaba Dosza	Romania	2.17	
5	Jan Dahlgren	Sweden	2.14	
6	Edgar Kirst	East Germany	2.14	
7	Jean Bodin	France	2.14	
8	Lasse Viskari	Finland	2.14	
9	Enzo Del Forno	Italy	2.14	
10	Vladimír Malý	Czechoslovakia	2.14	
11	Petar Bogdanov	Bulgaria	2.11	
12	Heinz-Günther Zimmer	West Germany	2.11	
13	Philippe Martin	France	2.11	
14	Aleksandr Zhurba	Soviet Union	2.11	
15	Leif Roar Falkum	Norway	2.11	
16	Stephan Junge	East Germany	2.08	
17	Hans-Jörg Wildförster	West Germany	2.08	
18	Rustam Akhmetov	Soviet Union	2.08	
19	Paul De Preter	Belgium	2.05	
