= 1971 European Athletics Championships – Men's high jump =

Men's high jump at the European Athletics Championships

The men's high jump at the 1971 European Athletics Championships was held in Helsinki, Finland, at Helsinki Olympic Stadium on 13 and 14 August 1971.

== Medalists ==
Gold	Kęstutis Šapka; Soviet Union
Silver	Csaba Dosa; Romania
Bronze	Rustam Akhmetov; Soviet Union

== Results ==
=== Final ===
14 August

Rank	Name	Nationality	Result	Notes
1st place, gold medalist(s)	Kęstutis Šapka	Soviet Union	2.20	
2nd place, silver medalist(s)	Csaba Dosa	Romania	2.20	NR
3rd place, bronze medalist(s)	Rustam Akhmetov	Soviet Union	2.20	
4	István Major	Hungary	2.17	
5	Stefan Junge	East Germany	2.14	
5	Asko Pesonen	Finland	2.14	
7	Wojciech Gołębiowski	Poland	2.14	
8	Endre Kelemen	Hungary	2.11	
9	József Tihanyi	Hungary	2.11	
10	Valentin Gavrilov	Soviet Union	2.11	
11	Jiří Palkovský	Czechoslovakia	2.11	
12	Hermann Magerl	West Germany	2.11	
13	Roman Moravec	Czechoslovakia	2.11	
14	Christer Celion	Sweden	2.08	
15	Gian Marco Schivo	Italy	2.08	
16	Branko Vivod	Yugoslavia	2.08	
17	Erminio Azzaro	Italy	2.05	

=== Qualification ===
13 August

Rank	Name	Nationality	Result	Notes
	Jiří Palkovský	Czechoslovakia	2.12	Q
	Roman Moravec	Czechoslovakia	2.12	Q
	Stefan Junge	East Germany	2.12	Q
	József Tihanyi	Hungary	2.12	Q
	Christer Celion	Sweden	2.12	Q
	Branko Vivod	Yugoslavia	2.12	Q
	Hermann Magerl	West Germany	2.12	Q
	Asko Pesonen	Finland	2.12	Q
	Rustam Akhmetov	Soviet Union	2.12	Q
	István Major	Hungary	2.12	Q
	Endre Kelemen	Hungary	2.12	Q
	Csaba Dosa	Romania	2.12	Q
	Valentin Gavrilov	Soviet Union	2.12	Q
	Kęstutis Šapka	Soviet Union	2.12	Q
	Wojciech Gołębiowski	Poland	2.12	Q
	Gian Marco Schivo	Italy	2.12	Q
	Erminio Azzaro	Italy	2.12	Q
	Jan Dahlgren	Sweden	2.10	
	Robert Sainte-Rose	France	2.10	
	Henri Elliott	France	2.10	
	Reijo Vähälä	Finland	2.08	
	Ladislav Borodáč	Czechoslovakia	2.08	
	Kenneth Lundmark	Sweden	2.08	
	Gunther Spielvogel	West Germany	2.05	
	Gérard Lamy	France	2.05	
	Lothar Doster	West Germany	2.05	
	Nurullah Candan	Turkey	1.90	

== Participation ==
According to an unofficial count, 27 athletes from 13 countries participated in the event.

- Czechoslovakia (3)
- East Germany (1)
- Finland (2)
- France (3)
- Hungary (3)
- Italy (2)
- Poland (1)
- Romania (1)
- Soviet Union (3)
- Sweden (3)
- Turkey (1)
- West Germany (3)
- Yugoslavia (1)
