= 1971 European Athletics Indoor Championships – Men's high jump =

The men's high jump event at the 1971 European Athletics Indoor Championships was held on 13 March in Sofia.

== Results ==
Rank	Name	Nationality	1.95	2.00	2.05	2.08	2.11	2.14	2.17	2.20	Result	Notes
1st place, gold medalist(s)	István Major	Hungary	–	o	o	–	o	o	o	xxx	2.17	
2nd place, silver medalist(s)	Jüri Tarmak	Soviet Union	–	–	–	o	o	xo	o	xxx	2.17	
3rd place, bronze medalist(s)	Endre Kelemen	Hungary	–	–	–	o	o	o	xxo	xxx	2.17	
4	Lothar Doster	West Germany	–	–	o	o	xo	xo	xxx		2.14	
5	Thomas Zacharias	West Germany	o	o	o	o	xxo	xo	xxx		2.14	
6	Kęstutis Šapka	Soviet Union	–	o	xo	o	o	xxo	xxx		2.14	
7	Rudolf Baudis	Czechoslovakia	–	–	xo	o	o	xxx			2.11	
8	Sergey Budalov	Soviet Union	–	xo	xxo	o	o	xxx			2.11	
9	Ingomar Sieghart	West Germany	–	o	o	xo	xo	xxx			2.11	
10	Erminio Azzaro	Italy	–	–	o	–	xxo	xxx			2.11	
11	Branko Vivod	Yugoslavia	o	o	o	xxo	xxo	xxx			2.11	
12	Jan Dahlgren	Sweden	–	o	–	xo	–	xxx			2.08	
13	Kenneth Lundmark	Sweden	–	o	–	xxo	–	xxx			2.08	
14	Gian Marco Schivo	Italy	–	–	xo	xxo	xxx				2.08	
15	Vasilios Papadimitriou	Greece	–	o	o	xxx					2.05	
16	Vladimír Malý	Czechoslovakia	o	o	o	xxx					2.05	
17	David Livesey	Great Britain	o	o	xo	xxx					2.05	
18	Petar Bogdanov	Bulgaria	–	o	xxo	xxx					2.05	
18	Lech Klinger	Poland	–	o	xxo	xxx					2.05	
20	Patrick Fillion	France									2.00	
