= Athletics at the 1970 Summer Universiade – Men's high jump =

The men's high jump event at the 1970 Summer Universiade was held at the Stadio Comunale in Turin on 5 and 6 September 1970.

== Medalists ==
Gold	Silver	Bronze
Valentin Gavrilov; Soviet Union	Erminio Azzaro; Italy	Șerban Ioan; Romania

== Results ==
=== Qualification ===
Rank	Heat	Athlete	Nationality	Result	Notes
?	?	Gérard Caporossi	France	2.00	
?	?	Patrick Fillion	France	2.00	
?	?	José Martín	Spain	2.00	
?	?	Valentin Gavrilov	Soviet Union	2.00	
?	?	Erminio Azzaro	Italy	2.00	
?	?	Șerban Ioan	Romania	2.00	
?	?	Pat Matzdorf	United States	2.00	
?	?	Jaroslav Alexa	Czechoslovakia	2.00	
?	?	Hidehiko Tomizawa	Japan	2.00	
?	?	József Tihanyi	Hungary	2.00	
?	?	Ioannis Kousoulas	Greece	2.00	
?	?	Endre Kelemen	Hungary	2.00	
?	?	Gian Marco Schivo	Italy	2.00	
?	?	Ryszard Pawelec	Poland	2.00	
?	?	Vasilios Papadimitriou	Greece	2.00	
?	?	Zbyněk Kužela	Czechoslovakia	2.00	
?	?	Olusesan Onafowokon	Nigeria	2.00	
?	?	Mustapha Ndir	Ivory Coast	2.00	
?	?	Miguel Durañona	Cuba	2.00	
?	?	Ian Moss	Australia	1.95	
?	?	Phil Taylor	Great Britain	1.95	
?	?	Herbert Janko	Austria	1.95	
23	?	Om Parkash	Indonesia	1.90	
?	?	Mahmoud Karaichedaghi	Iran	1.80	
?	?	Willi Posch	Austria	1.80	

=== Final ===
Rank	Name	Nationality	Result	Notes
1st place, gold medalist(s)	Valentin Gavrilov	Soviet Union	2.18	
2nd place, silver medalist(s)	Erminio Azzaro	Italy	2.15	
3rd place, bronze medalist(s)	Șerban Ioan	Romania	2.15	
4	Pat Matzdorf	United States	2.15	
5	Jaroslav Alexa	Czechoslovakia	2.12	
6	Hidehiko Tomizawa	Japan	2.12	
7	József Tihanyi	Hungary	2.12	
8	Ioannis Kousoulas	Greece	2.12	
9	Endre Kelemen	Hungary	2.09	
10	Gian Marco Schivo	Italy	2.09	
11	Ryszard Pawelec	Poland	2.09	
12	Vasilios Papadimitriou	Greece	2.09	
13	Gérard Caporossi	France	2.09	
14	Patrick Fillion	France	2.06	
15	Zbyněk Kužela	Czechoslovakia	2.06	
16	Olusesan Onafowokon	Nigeria	2.03	
17	Mustapha Ndir	Ivory Coast	2.00	
18	José Martín	Spain	2.00	
19	Miguel Durañona	Cuba	1.90	
