= 1972 European Athletics Indoor Championships – Men's high jump =

The men's high jump event at the 1972 European Athletics Indoor Championships was held on 11 March in Grenoble.

== Results ==
Rank	Name	Nationality	1.90	1.95	2.00	2.05	2.08	2.11	2.14	2.17	2.20	2.22	2.24	2.26	Result	Notes
1st place, gold medalist(s)	István Major	Hungary	–	–	–	o	–	xo	xo	o	o	xo	xxo	xxx	2.24	CR
2nd place, silver medalist(s)	Kęstutis Šapka	Soviet Union	–	–	–	–	o	o	xxo	o	xxo	o	xxx		2.22	
3rd place, bronze medalist(s)	Jüri Tarmak	Soviet Union	–	–	–	o	o	o	xo	o	o	xo	xxx		2.22	
4	Jan Dahlgren	Sweden	–	–	o	o	o	o	o	xo	xxx				2.17	
5	Vladimír Malý	Czechoslovakia	–	–	xo	o	o	o	xo	xxo	xxx				2.17	
6	Asko Pesonen	Finland	–	–	–	xo	–	o	xxo	xxo	xxx				2.17	
7	József Tihanyi	Hungary	–	–	–	–	o	o	o	xxx					2.14	
8	Roman Moravec	Czechoslovakia	–	o	o	o	o	o	o	xxx					2.14	
9	Hans–Jörg Wildförster	West Germany	–	–	o	o	o	o	xxx						2.11	
9	Rudolf Baudis	Czechoslovakia	–	–	o	o	o	o	xxx						2.11	
11	Michel Le Goff	France	–	–	o	o	o	o	xxx						2.11	
12	Petar Bogdanov	Bulgaria	–	–	o	o	xo	xxx							2.08	
13	Gian Marco Schivo	Italy	–	o	o	o	–	xxx							2.05	
13	Csaba Dosa	Romania	–	o	o	o	–	xxx							2.05	
15	Beat Tenger	Switzerland	o	o	xxx										1.95	
