= 1978 European Athletics Indoor Championships – Men's high jump =

The men's high jump event at the 1978 European Athletics Indoor Championships was held on 12 March in Milan.

== Results ==
Rank	Name	Nationality	Result	Notes
1st place, gold medalist(s)	Vladimir Yashchenko	Soviet Union	2.35	WR
2nd place, silver medalist(s)	Rolf Beilschmidt	East Germany	2.29	
3rd place, bronze medalist(s)	Wolfgang Killing	West Germany	2.27	
4	Aleksandr Grigoryev	Soviet Union	2.25	
5	Sergey Senyukov	Soviet Union	2.21	
6	Oscar Raise	Italy	2.21	
7	Jacek Wszoła	Poland	2.21	
8	Bernd Mühle	West Germany	2.18	
9	Carlo Thränhardt	West Germany	2.18	
10	Terje Totland	Norway	2.18	
11	Bruno Bruni	Italy	2.15	
12	Paul Gränicher	Switzerland	2.15	
12	Josef Hrabal	Czechoslovakia	2.15	
14	Mark Naylor	Great Britain	2.15	
15	Ekrem Özdamar	Turkey	2.10	
15	Massimo Di Giorgio	Italy	2.10	
17	Danial Temim	Yugoslavia	2.10	
18	Paul Poaniéwa	France	2.05	
