= 1977 European Athletics Indoor Championships – Men's high jump =

The men's high jump event at the 1977 European Athletics Indoor Championships was held on 13 March in San Sebastián.

== Results ==
Rank	Name	Nationality	2.00	2.05	2.10	2.13	2.16	2.19	2.22	2.25	2.29	Result	Notes
1st place, gold medalist(s)	Jacek Wszoła	Poland	–	–	o	–	xo	xo	o	o	xxx	2.25	
2nd place, silver medalist(s)	Rolf Beilschmidt	East Germany	–	–	o	o	o	o	o	xxx		2.22	
3rd place, bronze medalist(s)	Ruud Wielart	Netherlands	–	–	o	o	o	xxo	o	xxx		2.22	
4	Rune Almén	Sweden	–	–	o	o	o	o	xo	xxx		2.22	
5	Bruno Bruni	Italy	–	–	o	–	xo	o	xxx			2.19	
6	Edgar Kirst	East Germany	–	o	o	o	xo	o	xxx			2.19	
7	Francisco Martín	Spain	–	o	xxo	xo	o	o	xxx			2.19	
8	Gianni Davito	Italy	o	o	o	xo	o	xo	xxx			2.19	
9	Carlo Thränhardt	West Germany	–	–	o	o	xo	xxo	xxx			2.19	
10	William Nachtegael	Belgium	o	o	o	xo	xo	xxo	xxx			2.19	
11	André Schneider-Laub	West Germany	–	o	o	o	o	xxx				2.16	
12	Guy Moreau	Belgium	–	–	o	–	xo	xxx				2.16	
13	Franck Bonnet	France	–	o	xo	o	xxo	xxx				2.16	
13	István Major	Hungary	–	o	xo	o	xxo	xxx				2.16	
15	Laurent Duval	France	o	o	xxo	o	xxx					2.13	
16	Endre Kelemen	Hungary	–	–	–	xo	xxx					2.13	
17	Heinz-Günther Zimmer	West Germany	–	o	o	xxx						2.10	
18	Roberto Cabrejas	Spain	o	o	o	xxx						2.10	
19	Ekrem Özdemar	Turkey	o	xo	o	xxx						2.10	
20	Paul Poaniéwa	France	–	o	xo	–	xxx					2.10	
