= 1976 European Athletics Indoor Championships – Men's high jump =

The men's high jump event at the 1976 European Athletics Indoor Championships was held on 22 February in Munich.

== Results ==
Rank	Name	Nationality	Result	Notes
1st place, gold medalist(s)	Sergey Senyukov	Soviet Union	2.22	
2nd place, silver medalist(s)	Jacques Aletti	France	2.19	
3rd place, bronze medalist(s)	Walter Boller	West Germany	2.19	
4	Bruno Brokken	Belgium	2.19	
5	Leif Roar Falkum	Norway	2.19	
6	Rolf Beilschmidt	East Germany	2.16	
7	Vladimir Kiba	Soviet Union	2.16	
8	Jarosław Gwóźdź	Poland	2.13	
9	Francisco Martín	Spain	2.13	
9	Torbjörn Larsson	Sweden	2.13	
11	Franck Bonnet	France	2.13	
12	Rune Almén	Sweden	2.10	
13	Jean Bodin	France	2.10	
14	Vladimír Malý	Czechoslovakia	2.10	
15	Dimitrios Patronis	Greece	2.05	
