= Athletics at the 1977 Summer Universiade – Men's high jump =

The men's high jump event at the 1977 Summer Universiade was held at the Vasil Levski National Stadium in Sofia on 22 and 23 August.

== Medalists ==
Gold	Silver	Bronze
Jacek Wszoła; Poland	Paul Poaniéwa; France	Aleksandr Grigoryev; Soviet Union

== Results ==
=== Qualification ===
Rank	Group	Athlete	Nationality	Result	Notes
?	?	Franklin Jacobs	United States	2.10	
?	?	Jacek Wszoła	Poland	2.10	
?	?	István Major	Hungary	2.10	
?	?	Aleksandr Grigoryev	Soviet Union	2.10	
?	?	Kazunori Koshikawa	Japan	2.10	
?	?	Jiří Palkovský	Czechoslovakia	2.10	
?	?	Bruno Bruni	Italy	2.10	
?	?	Jürgen Lichtenberg	West Germany	2.10	
?	?	Rodolfo Bergamo	Italy	2.10	
?	?	Claude Ferragne	Canada	2.10	
?	?	Jochen Schieker	West Germany	2.10	
?	?	Wolfgang Tschirk	Austria	2.10	
?	?	József Jámbor	Hungary	2.10	
?	?	Odysseas Papatolis	Greece	2.10	
?	?	Paul Poaniéwa	France	2.10	
?	?	Richard Spencer	Cuba	2.10	
?	?	Takao Sakamoto	Japan	2.05	
?	?	Kyriakos Kondokoukis	Greece	2.05	
?	?	Leszek Kałek	Poland	2.05	
?	?	Ekrem Özdamar	Turkey	2.05	
?	?	Rumen Yotsov	Bulgaria	2.00	
?	?	Hussein Ali Hassan	Iraq	1.95	
?	?	Georges Banthoud	Congo	1.90	
?	?	Ahmed Ibrahim Seddig	Sudan	1.90	

=== Final ===
Rank	Athlete	Nationality	Result	Notes
1st place, gold medalist(s)	Jacek Wszoła	Poland	2.22	
2nd place, silver medalist(s)	Paul Poaniéwa	France	2.19	
3rd place, bronze medalist(s)	Aleksandr Grigoryev	Soviet Union	2.19	
4	Richard Spencer	Cuba	2.19	
5	Wolfgang Tschirk	Austria	2.16	
6	István Major	Hungary	2.16	
7	Bruno Bruni	Italy	2.16	
8	Franklin Jacobs	United States	2.16	
9	Kazunori Koshikawa	Japan	2.13	
10	Jochen Schieker	West Germany	2.10	
11	József Jámbor	Hungary	2.10	
12	Claude Ferragne	Canada	2.10	
13	Odysseas Papatolis	Greece	2.10	
14	Jiří Palkovský	Czechoslovakia	2.10	
15	Rodolfo Bergamo	Italy	2.00	
	Jürgen Lichtenberg	West Germany	NM	
