= Athletics at the 1973 Summer Universiade – Men's high jump =

The men's high jump event at the 1973 Summer Universiade was held at the Central Lenin Stadium in Moscow on 18 and 20 August.

== Medalists ==
Gold	Silver	Bronze
Vladimír Malý; Czechoslovakia	István Major; Hungary	Vladimir Abramov; Soviet Union; Enzo Del Forno; Italy; Csaba Dosa; Romania; Valentin Gavrilov; Soviet Union; John Hawkins; Canada; Robert Joseph; United States; Roman Moravec; Czechoslovakia

== Results ==
=== Qualification ===
Rank	Group	Athlete	Nationality	Result	Notes
?	?	Enzo Del Forno	Italy	2.05	
?	?	Robert Joseph	United States	2.05	
?	?	István Major	Hungary	2.05	
?	?	Roman Moravec	Czechoslovakia	2.05	
?	?	Claude Ferragne	Canada	2.05	
?	?	Csaba Dosa	Romania	2.05	
?	?	Vladimír Malý	Czechoslovakia	2.05	
?	?	Boško Radovanović	Yugoslavia	2.05	
?	?	Vladimir Abramov	Soviet Union	2.05	
?	?	Ferenc Dóczi	Hungary	2.05	
?	?	John Hawkins	Canada	2.05	
?	?	Valentin Gavrilov	Soviet Union	2.05	
14	?	José León	Mexico	1.95	
?	?	Wolfgang Steinbach	Austria	1.90	
?	?	Gabriel Cepeda	Puerto Rico	1.90	
?	?	Anthony Holbrook-Smith	Ghana	1.90	
?	?	Georges Banthoud	Congo	1.90	
?	?	Fidèle Bakamba	Central African Republic	1.85	
?	?	Jacques-Marie Ngassaky-Ibata	Congo	1.85	

=== Final ===
Rank	Athlete	Nationality	Result	Notes
1st place, gold medalist(s)	Vladimír Malý	Czechoslovakia	2.18	
2nd place, silver medalist(s)	István Major	Hungary	2.18	
3rd place, bronze medalist(s)	Vladimir Abramov	Soviet Union	2.15	
3rd place, bronze medalist(s)	Enzo Del Forno	Italy	2.15	
3rd place, bronze medalist(s)	Csaba Dosa	Romania	2.15	
3rd place, bronze medalist(s)	Valentin Gavrilov	Soviet Union	2.15	
3rd place, bronze medalist(s)	John Hawkins	Canada	2.15	
3rd place, bronze medalist(s)	Robert Joseph	United States	2.15	
3rd place, bronze medalist(s)	Roman Moravec	Czechoslovakia	2.15	
10	Claude Ferragne	Canada	2.10	
10	Ferenc Dóczi	Hungary	2.10	
12	Boško Radovanović	Yugoslavia	2.05	
12	Mihai Purice	Romania	2.05	
