= 1969 European Athletics Championships – Men's high jump =

Men's high jump at the European Athletics Championships

The men's high jump at the 1969 European Athletics Championships was held in Athens, Greece, at Georgios Karaiskakis Stadium on 18 and 19 September 1969.

== Medalists ==
Gold	Valentin Gavrilov; Soviet Union
Silver	Reijo Vähälä; Finland
Bronze	Erminio Azzaro; Italy

== Results ==
=== Final ===
19 September

Rank	Name	Nationality	Result	Notes
1st place, gold medalist(s)	Valentin Gavrilov	Soviet Union	2.17	
2nd place, silver medalist(s)	Reijo Vähälä	Finland	2.17	
3rd place, bronze medalist(s)	Erminio Azzaro	Italy	2.17	
4	Henri Elliott	France	2.14	
5	István Major	Hungary	2.14	
6	Christer Celion	Sweden	2.14	
7	József Tihanyi	Hungary	2.11	
8	Valeriy Skvortsov	Soviet Union	2.08	
8	Ladislav Borodáč	Czechoslovakia	2.08	
10	Luis Garriga	Spain	2.08	
10	Miodrag Todosijević	Yugoslavia	2.08	
10	Robert Sainte-Rose	France	2.08	
13	Șerban Ioan	Romania	2.08	
14	Jan Dahlgren	Sweden	2.00	
15	Sergey Martynov	Soviet Union	2.00	

=== Qualification ===
18 September

Rank	Name	Nationality	Result	Notes
	Valentin Gavrilov	Soviet Union	2.11	Q
	Erminio Azzaro	Italy	2.11	Q
	József Tihanyi	Hungary	2.11	Q
	István Major	Hungary	2.11	Q
	Ladislav Borodáč	Czechoslovakia	2.11	Q
	Luis Garriga	Spain	2.11	Q
	Valeriy Skvortsov	Soviet Union	2.11	Q
	Jan Dahlgren	Sweden	2.11	Q
	Șerban Ioan	Romania	2.11	Q
	Sergey Martynov	Soviet Union	2.11	Q
	Christer Celion	Sweden	2.11	Q
	Robert Sainte-Rose	France	2.08	Q
	Reijo Vähälä	Finland	2.08	Q
	Henri Elliott	France	2.08	Q
	Miodrag Todosijević	Yugoslavia	2.08	Q
	Christian Le Hérissé	France	2.05	
	Ioannis Kousoulas	Greece	2.05	
	Csaba Dosa	Romania	2.05	
	Rudolf Baudis	Czechoslovakia	2.05	
	Thomas Wiesser	Switzerland	2.05	
	Michel Portmann	Switzerland	2.05	
	Herbert Hüttl	East Germany	2.00	
	Murat Ayat	Turkey	1.95	

== Participation ==
According to an unofficial count, 23 athletes from 14 countries participated in the event.

- Czechoslovakia (2)
- East Germany (1)
- Finland (1)
- France (3)
- Greece (1)
- Hungary (2)
- Italy (1)
- Romania (2)
- Soviet Union (3)
- Spain (1)
- Sweden (2)
- Switzerland (2)
- Turkey (1)
- Yugoslavia (1)
