= 1975 European Athletics Indoor Championships – Men's high jump =

The men's high jump event at the 1975 European Athletics Indoor Championships was held on 8 March in Katowice.

== Results ==
Rank	Name	Nationality	Result	Notes
1st place, gold medalist(s)	Vladimir Maly	Czechoslovakia	2.21	
2nd place, silver medalist(s)	Endre Kelemen	Hungary	2.19	
3rd place, bronze medalist(s)	Rune Almén	Sweden	2.19	
4	Aleksandr Grigoryev	Soviet Union	2.19	
5	Paul Poaniéwa	France	2.19	
6	Rolf Beilschmidt	East Germany	2.19	
7	Giordano Ferrari	Italy	2.16	
8	István Major	Hungary	2.16	
9	Harri Sundell	Finland	2.16	
10	Valeriy Abramov	Soviet Union	2.16	
11	Jacek Wszoła	Poland	2.16	
12	Dimitrios Patronis	Greece	2.13	
13	Rumen Yotsov	Bulgaria	2.13	
14	Per Kristian Vik	Norway	2.13	
15	Jiří Palkovský	Czechoslovakia	2.10	
16	Gustavo Marqueta	Spain	2.10	
17	Paul De Preter	Belgium	2.10	
18	Ekrem Özdamar	Turkey	2.05	
