= Ádám Szepesi =

Hungarian high jumper

Ádám Szepesi (born 12 April 1945) is a retired Hungarian high jumper.

He was born in Békéscsaba. He finished fifth at the 1972 Summer Olympics with a jump of 2.18 metres. He became Hungarian high jump champion in 1972, rivalling with Endre Kelemen and István Major.

His personal best jump was 2.21 metres, achieved in 1972.
