= Men's high jump Italian record progression =

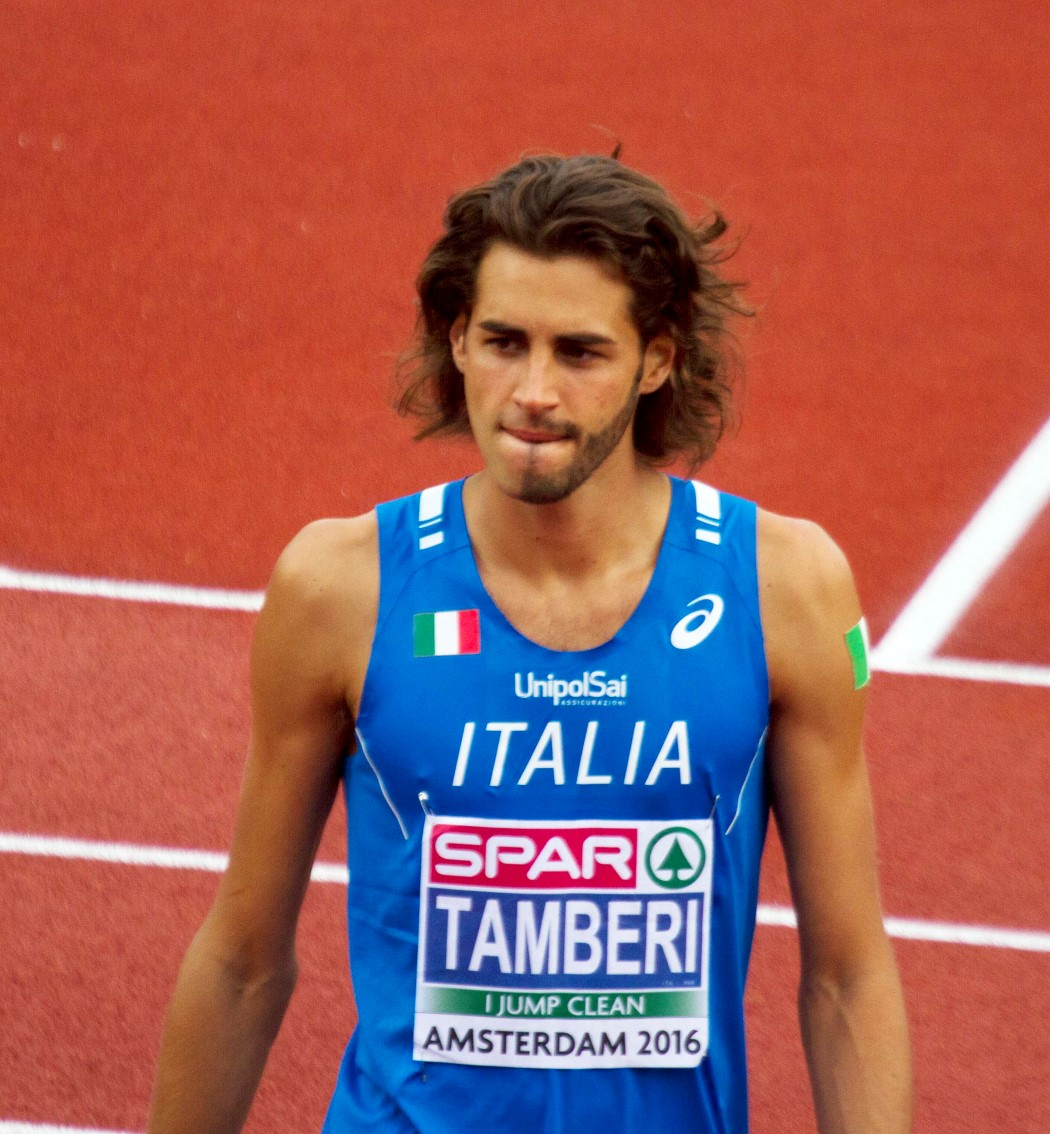
Gianmarco Tamberi is the current Italian record holder.

The Italian record progression for men's high jump is recognised by the Italian Athletics Federation (FIDAL).

== Record progression ==
Breaking down barriers
Indoor records
Record outdoor but lower than absolute

Record	Athlete	Venue	Date	Notes
1.70 m	Carlo Colombo	(Italy) Milan	30 June 1889	
1.70 m	Orio Pizio	(Italy) Milan	16 September 1900	
1.73 m	Gaspare Torretta	(Italy) Rome	31 March 1906	
1.75 m	Luigi Brambilla	(Italy) Sesto San Giovanni	1 April 1906	
1.75 m	Alfredo Vecchi	(Italy) Carpi	7 October 1906	
1.75 m	Gaspare Torretta	(Italy) Vigevano	28 October 1906	
1.75 m	Gaspare Torretta	(Italy) Venezia	8 May 1907	
1.75 m	Emilio Brambilla	(Italy) Vigevano	11 October 1908	
1.75 m	Emilio Brambilla	(Italy) Milan	22 November 1908	
1.75 m	Angelo Pedrelli	(Italy) Bologna	8 December 1909	
1.75 m	Carlo Butti	(Italy) Milan	19 February 1911	
1.75 m	Alfredo Pagani	(Italy) Tivoli	9 July 1911	
1.75 m	Angelo Tonini	(Italy) Rome	8 June 1912	
1.75 m	Carlo Butti	(Italy) Alessandria	18 May 1913	
1.75 m	Giuseppe Tugnoli	(Italy) Florence	30 April 1916	
1.77 m	Pierino Pisati	(Italy) La Spezia	17 August 1919	
1.78 m	Carlo Ghiringhelli	(Italy) Legnano	2 October 1921	
1.81 m	Ettore Uicich	(Italy) Rome	22 April 1923	
1.84 m	Graziano Corona	(Italy) Cagliari	13 January 1924	
1.84 m	Giuseppe Palmieri	(Italy) Naples	13 June 1926	
1.85 m	Giuseppe Palmieri	(Italy) Rome	21 April 1927	
1.86 m	Giuseppe Palmieri	(Italy) Ascoli Piceno	17 July 1927	
1.86 m	Giuseppe Palmieri	(Italy) Padova	9 June 1929	
1.86 m	Angelo Tommasi	(Italy) Verona	27 September 1931	
1.87 m	Angelo Tommasi	(Italy) Verona	30 March 1932	
1.90 m	Angelo Tommasi	(Italy) Milan	15 May 1932	
1.91 m	Angelo Tommasi	(Italy) Florence	26 June 1932	
1.92 m	Angelo Tommasi	(Italy) Verona	1 October 1933	
1.92 m	Angelo Tommasi	(Italy) Bologna	23 August 1936	
1.92 m	Renato Dotti	(Italy) Bologna	23 July 1938	
1.93 m	Alfredo Campagner	(Italy) Turin	18 June 1939	
1.95 m	Alfredo Campagner	(Italy) Parma	26 May 1940	
1.96 m	Alfredo Campagner	(Italy) Parma	5 October 1941	
1.98 m	Alfredo Campagner	(Italy) Parma	14 June 1942	
1.99 m	Gianmario Roveraro	(Italy) Bologna	24 June 1956	
2.01 m	Gianmario Roveraro	(Switzerland) Lugano	9 September 1956	
2.02 m	Gianmario Roveraro	(Italy) Genoa	6 October 1957	
2.03 m	Walter Zamparelli	(Italy) Rome	7 April 1962	
2.03 m	Roberto Galli	(Italy) Rome	7 April 1962	
2.04 m	Walter Zamparelli	(Italy) Rome	21 April 1962	
2.04 m	Antonio Brandoli	(Italy) Milan	5 July 1962	
2.05 m	Mauro Bogliatto	(Italy) Alessandria	1 May 1963	
2.06 m	Roberto Galli	(Italy) Pisa	1 June 1963	
2.08 m	Roberto Galli	(Italy) Pisa	1 June 1963	
2.09 m	Mauro Bogliatto	(Brazil) Porto Alegre	8 September 1963	
2.09 m	Mauro Bogliatto	(Italy) Rome	21 August 1965	
2.10 m	Mauro Bogliatto	(Italy) Rome	10 October 1965	
2.11 m	Erminio Azzaro	(West Germany) Sindelfingen	19 June 1966	
2.12 m	Giacomo Crosa	(Italy) Rome	26 May 1968	
2.12 m	Giacomo Crosa	Mexico City	19 October 1968	
2.14 m	Giacomo Crosa	Mexico City	19 October 1968	
2.14 m	Giacomo Crosa	Mexico City	20 October 1968	
2.15 m	Erminio Azzaro	(Italy) Formia	11 May 1969	
2.16 m	Erminio Azzaro	(Italy) Milan	29 June 1969	
2.17 m	Erminio Azzaro	(Greece) Athens	16 September 1969	
2.17 m	Erminio Azzaro	(Italy) Formia	7 May 1970	
2.17 m	Erminio Azzaro	(Italy) Syracuse	5 July 1970	
2.18 m	Erminio Azzaro	(Italy) Rieti	28 August 1971	
2.18 m	Erminio Azzaro	(Spain) Madrid	11 September 1971	
2.19 m	Enzo Del Forno	(Italy) Milan	26 June 1973	
2.20 m (i)	Enzo Del Forno	(Italy) Genoa	27 February 1974	
2.21 m (i)	Enzo Del Forno	(Italy) Udine	23 March 1974	
2.20 m	Enzo Del Forno	(Italy) Viareggio	7 August 1974	
2.20 m	Enzo Del Forno	(Italy) Milan	1 May 1975	
2.20 m	Giordano Ferrari	(Italy) Fiorano Modenese	29 May 1975	
2.21 m	Enzo Del Forno	(Italy) Siena	16 July 1975	
2.22 m	Enzo Del Forno	(Italy) Syracuse	8 October 1975	
2.22 m	Rodolfo Bergamo	(Italy) Milan	8 June 1976	
2.23 m	Riccardo Fortini	(Italy) Livorno	13 June 1976	
2.23 m (i)	Oscar Raise	(Italy) Milan	4 February 1978	
2.24 m (i)	Oscar Raise	(Czechoslovakia) Třinec	3 March 1978	
2.24 m	Rodolfo Bergamo	(Italy) Rome	25 July 1978	
2.26 m (i)	Bruno Bruni	(Italy) Genoa	3 February 1979	
2.25 m	Massimo Di Giorgio	(Socialist Federal Republic of Yugoslavia) Nova Gorica	15 April 1979	
2.26 m	Massimo Di Giorgio	(Italy) Udine	20 May 1979	
2.27 m	Oscar Raise	(Italy) Bologna	19 September 1979	
2.27 m	Massimo Di Giorgio	(Italy) Bologna	19 September 1979	
2.27 m	Bruno Bruni	(Italy) Bologna	19 September 1979	
2.28 m	Paolo Borghi	(Italy) Santa Lucia di Piave	25 May 1980	
2.29 m	Massimo Di Giorgio	(Italy) Pisa	5 July 1980	
2.30 m	Massimo Di Giorgio	(Italy) Udine	15 June 1981	
2.30 m	Luca Toso	(Italy) Padova	13 June 1988	
2.32 m	Luca Toso	(Italy) Turin	21 July 1988	
2.33 m	Marcello Benvenuti	(Italy) Verona	12 September 1989	
2.33 m (i)	Silvano Chesani	(Italy) Ancona	13 February 2013	
2.34 m (i)	Marco Fassinotti	(Italy) Ancona	23 February 2014	
2.33 m	Marco Fassinotti	(Norway) Oslo	11 June 2015	
2.34 m	Gianmarco Tamberi	(Germany) Cologne	1 July 2015	
2.37 m	Gianmarco Tamberi	(Germany) Eberstadt	2 August 2015	
2.38 m (i)	Gianmarco Tamberi	(Czech Republic) Hustopeče	13 February 2016	
2.39 m	Gianmarco Tamberi	(Monaco) Monte Carlo	15 June 2016	

== See also ==
- List of Italian records in athletics
- Men's high jump world record progression
- Women's high jump Italian record progression
