= Jos Romersa =

Luxembourgish gymnast (1915–2016)

- Full name: Jos André Romersa
- Born: 1 November 1915 Dudelange, Luxembourg
- Died: 6 November 2016 (aged 101) Dudelange, Luxembourg
- Relatives: Marc Romersa (son)

Gymnastics career
- Discipline: Men's artistic gymnastics
- Country represented: Luxembourg
- Gym: Turnveräin Union Diddeleng

Jos André Romersa (1 November 1915 – 6 November 2016) was a Luxembourgish gymnast who competed in the 1936 Summer Olympics in Berlin, Germany. He was born in Dudelange. At the gymnastics competition, his best individual finish was 58th in the horse vault. In 2008 he was promoted to the rank of Chevalier in the Order of Merit of the Grand Duchy of Luxembourg and in 2015 he turned 100. He died in Dudelange on 6 November 2016 at the age of 101.

== See also ==
- List of centenarians (sportspeople)
