= Iraja =

Iraja may refer to:

- One of two saints, Abadir and Iraja, in the Coptic Orthodox Church
- Irajá, a neighborhood in the city of Rio de Janeiro, Brazil
- Irajá Station, a subway station located in Irajá, Rio de Janeiro, Brazil

== People ==
- Irajá Abreu (born 1983), Brazilian politician and businessperson
- Irajá Cecy (born 1955), Brazilian athlete
- Irajá Damiani Pinto (1919–2014), Brazilian paleontologist and professor
