= Reijo Vähälä =

Finnish high jumper

Personal information
- Born: 7 March 1946 Alajärvi, Finland
- Died: 27 September 2024 (aged 78)
- Height: 188 cm (6 ft 2 in)
- Weight: 80 kg (180 lb)

Sport
- Sport: Athletics
- Event: High jump
- Club: Tampereen Pyrintö; Alajärven Ankkurit

Achievements and titles
- Personal best: High jump: 2.17 m (1969)
Medal record
Men's athletics
Representing Finland
European Championships
Silver medal – second place	1969 Athens	High jump

Reijo Untamo Vähälä (7 March 1946 – 27 September 2024) was a Finnish high jumper. He placed second in men's high jump at the 1969 European Athletics Championships.

== Career ==
In 1966 Vähälä won both the Finnish championship (2.04 m) and the Finnish under-21 championship (2.01 m) in men's high jump. In 1969 he only placed third at the Finnish championships and was not considered a potential medalist at the European Championships in Athens, but in the championship final he improved his Finnish record of 2.13 m twice, clearing first 2.14 m and then 2.17 m. Two other jumpers, Valentin Gavrilov of the Soviet Union and Erminio Azzaro of Italy, also cleared 2.17 m, and the medals were decided on countback with Vähälä winning a surprising silver.

Vähälä won his second Finnish national outdoor title in 1970 with a jump of 2.12 m; in addition, he was Finnish indoor champion in 1968 (2.03 m) and 1969 (2.00 m). He represented Finland again at the 1970 European Indoor Championships, where he placed 10th, and the 1971 European Championships, where he failed to qualify for the final.
