= Tecnam P2004 Bravo =

2002 Italian light monoplane

P2004
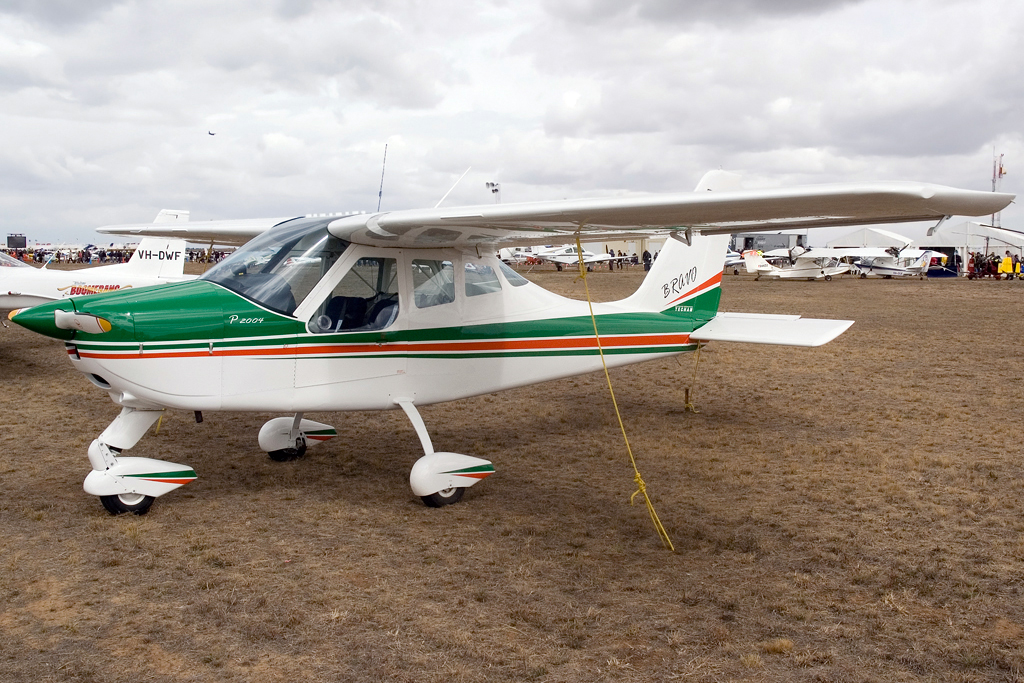

General information
- Type: Two-seat ultralight monoplane
- National origin: Italy
- Manufacturer: Tecnam
- Status: Active

History
- First flight: 2002

The Tecnam P2004 Bravo is a high-wing, light aircraft built by the Tecnam aircraft company. It is similar to the Tecnam P92 Echo Super, but has a cantilevered wing rather than the P92's strut-braced wing.

== Specifications (P2004 Bravo) ==
Data from Jane's All the World's Aircraft 2010-11

General characteristics

- Crew: 1
- Capacity: 1 passenger
- Length: 6.61 m (21 ft 8 in)
- Wingspan: 8.6 m (28 ft 3 in)
- Height: 2.6 m (8 ft 6 in)
- Wing area: 11 m^{2} (120 sq ft)
- Empty weight: 336 kg (741 lb)
- Max takeoff weight: 600 kg (1,323 lb)
- Max useful weight: 269 kg (593 lb)
- Powerplant: 1 × Rotax 912 ULS 4-cylinder air-cooled horizontally-opposed piston engine, 73.5 kW (98.6 hp)
- Propellers: 2-bladed Tonini fixed-pitch propeller

Performance

- Maximum speed: 238 km/h (148 mph, 129 kn) at sea level
- Cruise speed: 215 km/h (134 mph, 116 kn) (75% power)
- Stall speed: 84 km/h (52 mph, 45 kn) flaps up

64 km/h (40 mph; 35 kn)

- Never exceed speed: 290 km/h (180 mph, 160 kn)
- Range: 1,092 km (679 mi, 590 nmi)
- Service ceiling: 4,420 m (14,500 ft)
- g limits: +6 -3
- Rate of climb: 5.6 m/s (1,100 ft/min)
- Wing loading: 54 kg/m^{2} (11 lb/sq ft)
- Take-off run: 140 m (459 ft)
- Landing run: 120 m (394 ft)

Avionics

- Icom IC-A-200 radio
- AvMap EKP-IV colour GPS
- optional Garmin suite

== See also ==
Aircraft of comparable role, configuration, and era

- Tecnam P92
- Cessna 162 Skycatcher
