= Rustam Akhmetov =

Soviet-Ukrainian high jumper

Medal record

Men's athletics

Representing Soviet Union

European Championships
Bronze medal – third place	1971 Helsinki	High jump

Rustam Akhmetov (Ukrainian: Рустам Ахметов, born 17 May 1950) is a retired high jumper who represented the Soviet Union.

== Biography ==
He was born in Berdychiv, Ukrainian SSR, and was affiliated with the VSS Avangard in Berdychiv.

He won bronze medals at the 1968 European Junior Championships and the 1971 European Championships, and finished eighth in the high jump final at the 1972 Olympic Games. He became Soviet high jump champion in 1971, rivalling with Sergey Budalov and Kestutis Šapka.

His personal best jump was 2.23 metres, achieved in 1971.

He received a Ph.D. degree in 1979 and Doctor of Science degree in 2007.
