= Wolfgang Killing =

German high jumper

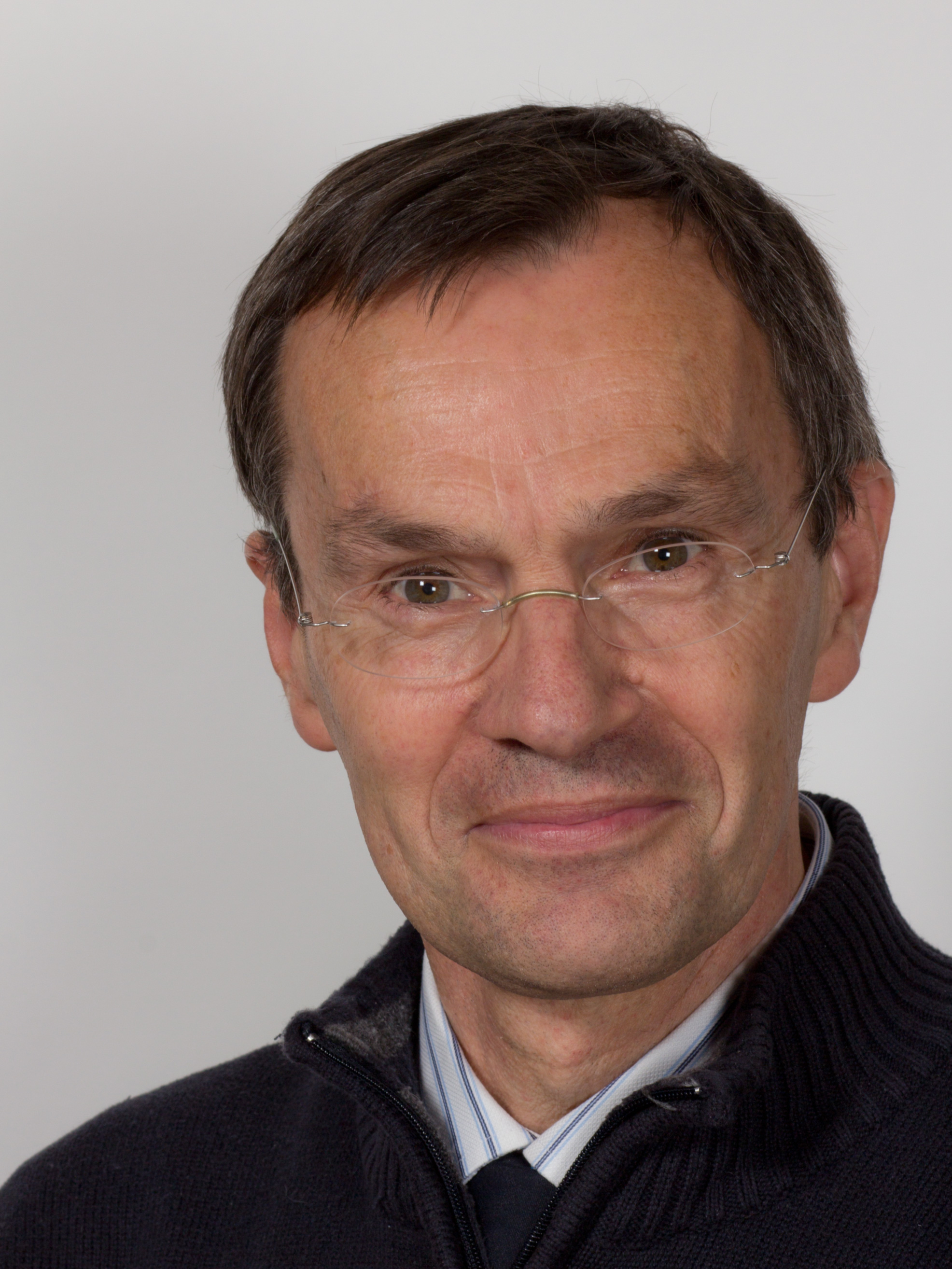
- Wolfgang Killing in 2012

Personal information
- Nationality: German
- Born: 12 February 1953 (age 73) Radevormwald, West Germany

Sport
- Sport: Athletics
- Event: High jump
Medal record
Men's athletics
Representing West Germany
European Indoor Championships
Bronze medal – third place	1978 Milan	High jump

Wolfgang Killing (born 12 February 1953) is a German athlete. He competed in the men's high jump at the 1976 Summer Olympics, representing West Germany.
