= Angelo Tommasi =

Italian high jumper

Personal information
- Nationality: Italian
- Born: 17 November 1911 Verona, Italy
- Died: 23 June 2004 (aged 92) Verona, Italy
- Height: 170 cm (5 ft 7 in)

Sport
- Country: Italy
- Sport: Athletics
- Event: High jump
- Club: Bentegodi Verona

Angiolino Tommasi also known as Angelo (17 November 1911 – 23 June 2004) was an Italian high jumper who competed at the 1932 Summer Olympics. He was the brother of the other Olympic athlete Virgilio Tommasi.

== Biography ==
Tommasi finished second behind Mihály Bodosi in the high jump event at the 1933 AAA Championships.

== National titles ==
He won five national championships at individual senior level.

- Italian Athletics Championships
  - High jump: 1931, 1932, 1933, 1935, 1936

== See also ==
- Men's high jump Italian record progression
