= Gaspare Torretta =

Italian athlete (1883–1910)

Personal information
- Nationality: Italian
- Born: 29 May 1883 Milan, Italy
- Died: 4 July 1910 (aged 27)

Sport
- Country: Italy
- Sport: Athletics
- Events: Sprint; Long jump
- Club: Mediolanum Milano

Achievements and titles
- Personal best: 100 m: 11.6 (1905)

Gaspare Torretta (29 May 1883 – 4 July 1910) was an Italian athlete who competed in the 1906 Summer Olympics and in the 1908 Summer Olympics.

== Biography ==
In 1906, Torretta finished 17th in the long jump event. He also participated in the 100 metres competition but was eliminated in the semi-finals. Two years later in the 100 metres event, Torretta took second place in his first round heat with a time of 12.0 seconds. He did not advance to the semifinals. Torretta died in Milan.

== Achievements ==
Year	Competition	Venue	Position	Event	Performance	Note
1908	Olympic Games	(United Kingdom) London	heat	100 metres	-	

== See also ==
- Men's high jump Italian record progression
- Italy at the 1908 Summer Olympics

== Notes ==
- Cook, Theodore Andrea (1908). The Fourth Olympiad, Being the Official Report. London: British Olympic Association.
- De Wael, Herman (2001). "Athletics 1908". Herman's Full Olympians. Archived from the original on 27 September 2006.
- Wudarski, Pawel (1999). "Wyniki Igrzysk Olimpijskich" (in Polish). Archived from the original on 16 February 2009.
