= Jim Barrineau =

American high jumper

Personal information
- Born: June 25, 1955 (age 71) Fort Gordon, Georgia, United States

Sport
- Sport: Track and field

James Archibald Barrineau, Jr. (born June 25, 1955 in ) is an American high jumper.

While competing for the University of Georgia he won the Southeastern Conference titles in 1976 and 1977. He was a four-time All American and competed in the Summer Universiade. He finished second in the 1976 NCAA Men's Indoor Track and Field Championships to Dwight Stones then of Long Beach State University. Barrineau vs Stones would maintain a rivalry for some time. While Stones made several world records early on, Barrineau won the last matchup and left with the Masters World Record.

== Olympics ==
Barrineau represented his native country in the 1976 Summer Olympics in Montreal, where he finished a disappointing eleventh place in the final, jumping 2.14 metres. Earlier in the qualifying round, he had already jumped 2.16 and he jumped 2.25 a month earlier in qualifying at the Olympic Trials in finishing behind Dwight Stones and the surprise jumping of Bill Jankunis. In the 1980 Olympic Trials, Barrineau, representing the United States Army beat Stones, but neither qualified for the team that did not go to the Olympics due to the 1980 Summer Olympics boycott. In the 1984 trials, Stones set the American record, while Barrineau finished a non-qualifying eighth. Barrineau also competed for the U.S. team at the 1983 Pan American Games.

== U.S. Army ==
Barrineau remained with the Army, rising to the rank of Colonel before retiring in 2005. He is sometimes confused with another retired Army Colonel of the same name who is an expert in cyber technology and security.

== Masters ==
Barrineau has not stopped jumping. In 1995, at the World Association of Veteran Athletes (WAVA) Championships in Buffalo, New York he again squared off against Stones in what might have been the most anticipated and watched masters field event competition to date. In that competition, Barrineau not only beat Stones, but set the M40 World Record at the time, beating the mark Stones had set a year earlier. That mark is still the currently ratified American Record. Barrineau also still holds the currently ratified record in the M35 division and has continued to be a top ranked jumper in each age division he has passed through.

Following in his father's footsteps, his son Tommy became the 2010 Indoor Heptathlon champion, also for the University of Georgia.

== Coaching ==
Barrineau spent over 20 years as a jumps coach at James W. Robinson Secondary School in Fairfax, Virginia. On 26 March 2019, he took over as head coach of the program.
