= Juan Carrasco (high jumper) =

Spanish high jumper

Personal information
- Nationality: Spanish
- Born: 30 March 1958 (age 67)

Sport
- Sport: Athletics
- Event: High jump

Juan Carrasco (born 30 March 1958) is a Spanish athlete. He competed in the men's high jump at the 1976 Summer Olympics.
