= Giacomo Crosa =

Italian high jumper

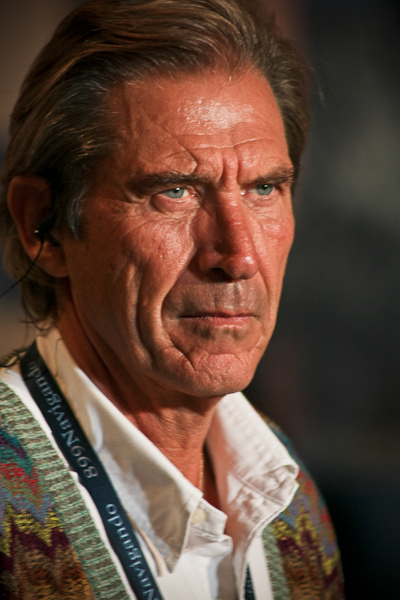

Personal information
- Nationality: Italian
- Born: 11 January 1947 (age 79) Predosa, Italy
- Height: 1.84 m (6 ft 1/2 in)
- Weight: 79 kg (174 lb)

Sport
- Country: Italy
- Sport: Athletics
- Event: High jump
- Club: C.S. Aeronautica Militare

Achievements and titles
- Personal best: High jump: 2.14 m (1968)

Giacomo Crosa (born 11 January 1947) is an Italian journalist and a former high jumper.

== Biography ==
He finished sixth at the 1968 Olympic Games, this is the best performance for an Italian high jumper at the Summer Olympics like Rodolfo Bergamo at 1976 Summer Olympics. His personal best jump is 2.14 metres, achieved in the 1968 Olympic qualifying round.

Became a commentator and sports journalist, in 2009 he received the appointment as Deputy Director R.T.I. - Mediaset, position held until 31 December 2012. He has conducted various editions and sports columns of TG5, Italia 1 and Rete 4, always present in all the initiatives in the information field of the Fininvest group.

== Olympic results ==
Year	Competition	Venue	Position	Event	Measure	Notes
1968	Olympic Games	Mexico City	6th	High jump	2.14 m	

== See also ==
- Men's high jump Italian record progression
