= Emilio Brambilla =

Italian athlete (1882–1938)

Personal information
- Nationality: Italian
- Born: 26 June 1882 Milan, Italy
- Died: 17 October 1938 (aged 56)

Sport
- Country: Italy
- Sport: Athletics
- Events: Sprint; Standing long jump Javelin throw Pentathlon
- Club: Forza e Coraggio Milano

Emilio Brambilla (26 June 1882 – 17 October 1938) was an Italian athlete.

== Biography ==
He competed in the 1906 Summer Olympics in Athens and in the 1908 Summer Olympics in London. In 1906 he finished 16th in the standing long jump event and 19th in the ancient pentathlon competition.

Two years later he participated in the 200 metres event he placed fifth and last in his preliminary heat and was eliminated from competition. He also participated in the freestyle javelin event but his result is unknown.

== National titles ==
Emilio Brambilla has won one time the individual national championship.

- 1 win in 110 metres hurdles (1910)

== Bibliography ==
- Cook, Theodore Andrea (1908). The Fourth Olympiad, Being the Official Report. London: British Olympic Association.
- De Wael, Herman (2001). "Athletics 1908". Herman's Full Olympians. Archived from the original on 27 September 2006.
- Wudarski, Pawel (1999). "Wyniki Igrzysk Olimpijskich" (in Polish). Archived from the original on 16 February 2009.

== See also ==
- Men's high jump Italian record progression
