= Alfredo Campagner =

Italian high jumper (1920–2016)

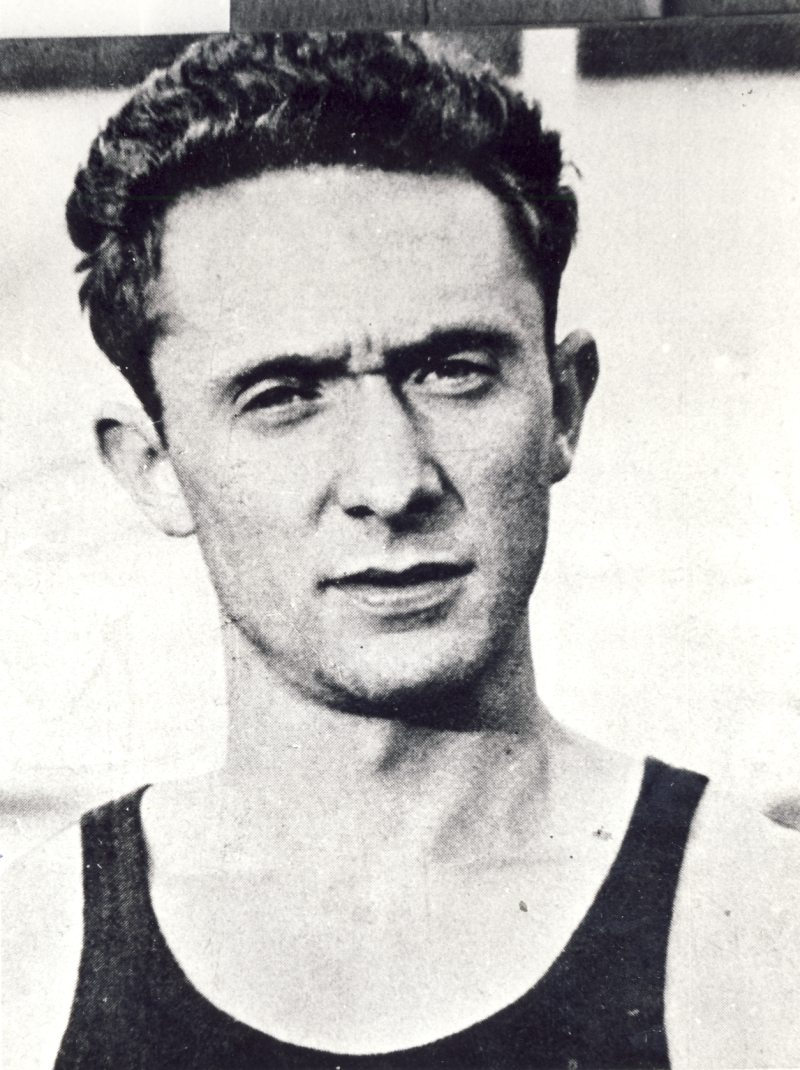

Personal information
- Born: 11 October 1920 Schio, Italy
- Died: 15 October 2016 (aged 96) Schio, Italy

Sport
- Country: Italy
- Sport: Athletics
- Event: High jump

Achievements and titles
- Personal best: 1.98 m (1942)

Alfredo Campagner (11 October 1920 – 15 October 2016) was an Italian high jumper, who won eight national championships at individual senior level from 1940 to 1951.

== Biography ==
His best result at international senior level was the 6th place at the 1946 European Athletics Championships held in Oslo, Norway.

== National records ==
- High jump: 1.98 m (Parma, 14 June 1942). holder for 14 years.

== Top 25 world lists ==
Year	Result	Place	Venue	Date
1941	1.96	22	(Italy) Parma	Oct 05
1942	1.98	10	(Italy) Parma	Jun 14
1945	1.97	12	(Italy) Vigevano	Oct 14
1946	1.95	24	(Italy) Bologna	Jun 20
1947	1.96	24	(Italy) Turin	Jun 15

== Achievements ==
Year	Competition	Venue	Position	Event	Measure	Notes
1946	European Championships	(Norway) Oslo	6th	High jump	1.90 m	

== National titles ==
- Italian Athletics Championships
  - High jump: 1940, 1941, 1942, 1943, 1945, 1046, 1947, 1951 (8)

== See also ==
- Men's high jump Italian record progression
