= Greg Joy =

American-born Canadian high jumper

Personal information
- Full name: Gregory Andrew Joy
- Born: April 23, 1956 (age 70) Portland, Oregon, U.S.
Medal record
Men's athletics
Representing Canada
Olympic Games
Silver medal – second place	1976 Montreal	High jump
Commonwealth Games
Silver medal – second place	1978 Edmonton	High jump

Gregory Andrew Joy (born April 23, 1956) is an American-born Canadian high jumper who stood 6' 4" tall and weighed 157 lbs while competing from 1973 to 1982 for Canada.

== Biography ==
Born in the U.S. to Canadian parents, Joy lived in Vancouver, British Columbia, from age 9 to 17.

Competing for the UTEP Miners track and field team, Joy won the 1975 and 1977 high jump at the NCAA Division I Indoor Track and Field Championships, with a best mark of 2.22 m at the 1977 edition.

He won the silver medal in the high jump at the 1976 Summer Olympics in Montreal, being the highest medal earned by Canada, which became the first host country in summer Olympics history not to produce at least one gold medal winner and later was selected to carry Canada's flag at the closing ceremonies.

For his achievement, Joy was voted the winner of the Lionel Conacher Award as Canada's top male athlete of 1976 and the Norton Crowe Award as Canada's top male amateur athlete of the year.

Joy's final successful jump from those games would be part of CBC's nightly sign-off montage for decades.

He would later marry Sue Holloway, who won two canoe sprint medals at the 1984 Summer Olympics in Los Angeles and also competed in the 1976 Winter Olympics in cross-country skiing.

In 1995, he ran as a Progressive Conservative candidate in the riding of Ottawa West, in the 1995 provincial election, finishing second to Bob Chiarelli by 1,618 votes.

As of 2016, he was an adjudicator for the landlord and tenant board in Ottawa.
