= Carlos Alberto Abaunza =

Nicaraguan high jumper (1959–2021)

Carlos Abaunza
Personal information
- Full name: Carlos Alberto Abaunza
- Nationality: Nicaraguan, United States of America
- Born: 15 August 1959 Managua, Nicaragua
- Died: 28 February 2021 (aged 61) Coral Gables, Florida
- Height: 1.86 m (6 ft 1 in)
- Weight: 82 kg (181 lb)

Sport
- Sport: Athletics
- Event: High jump

Carlos Abaunza (15 August 1959 – 28 February 2021) was a Nicaraguan high jumper. He competed in the men's high jump at the 1976 Summer Olympics. Carlos immigrated to the United States when he was 13 years old.
