= Rune Almén =

Swedish track and field athlete (born 1952)

Personal information
- Full name: Rune Rikard Almén
- Nationality: Sweden
- Born: 20 October 1952 (age 73) Trollhättan, Västra Götaland, Sweden
- Height: 188 cm (6 ft 2 in)
- Weight: 83 kg (183 lb)

Sport
- Country: Sweden
- Sport: Athletics
- Event: High jump
- Club: Trollhättans SK, IF Göta

Achievements and titles
- Personal bests: 2.23 m (outdoors); 2.24 m (indoors)
Medal record
Men's athletics
Representing Sweden
European Indoor Championships
Bronze medal – third place	1975 Katowice	High jump

Rune Almén (born 20 October 1952 in Trollhättan, Västra Götaland County) is a former Swedish track and field athlete who competed in the high jump.

Almén became the Swedish junior champion in high jump three years in a row between 1970 and 1972. He went on to become the leading Swedish high jumper in the late 1970s, as he became Swedish outdoor champion six years in a row between 1973 and 1978. He also won the Swedish Indoor Championships four times.

During his career, Almén set two Swedish records. His outdoor personal best was 2.23 meters, which he achieved in Helsinki on 17 August 1974. His indoor personal best was 2.24 meters, a height which he cleared in Skoghall on 12 December 1976.

On 3 May 1980 in Karlstad Almén managed to clear 1.90 meters in the standing high jump. This result is still considered an unofficial world record for the unusual event.

== National titles ==
- Swedish Athletics Championships
  - High jump: 1973, 1974, 1975, 1976, 1977, 1978
- Swedish Indoor Athletics Championships
  - High jump: 1974, 1975, 1978, 1980

== International competitions ==
Year	Competition	Venue	Position	Notes
Representing Sweden
1974	European Indoor Championships	Gothenburg, Sweden	7th	2.17 m
1974	European Championships	Rome, Italy	25th (q)	2.08 m
1975	European Indoor Championships	Katowice, Poland	3rd	2.19 m
1976	European Indoor Championships	Munich, West Germany	12th	2.10 m
1976	Olympic Games	Montreal, Canada	10th	2.18 m
1977	European Indoor Championships	San Sebastian, Spain	4th	2.22 m
1978	European Championships	Prague, Czechoslovakia	10th	2.18 m
