= Tonini =

Tonini is an Italian surname. Notable people with the surname include:

- Alessandro Tonini (1885–1932), Italian aeronautical engineer and aircraft designer and manufacturer
- Alice Tonini, Italian chess player
- Angelo Tonini (1888–1974), Italian long jumper and high jumper
- Ersilio Tonini (1914–2013), Italian Roman Catholic archbishop and cardinal
- Giorgio Tonini (born 1959), Italian journalist and politician
