= Jacques Aletti =

French high jumper

Personal information
- Nationality: French
- Born: 18 March 1955 (age 71) Tlemcen, French Algeria

Sport
- Sport: Athletics
- Event: High jump
Medal record
Men's athletics
Representing France
European Indoor Championships
Silver medal – second place	1976 Munich	High jump

Jacques Aletti (born 18 March 1955) is a French athlete. He competed in the men's high jump at the 1976 Summer Olympics.
