= Katsumi Fukura =

Japanese high jumper

Personal information
- Nationality: Japanese
- Born: 21 February 1953 (age 73)

Sport
- Sport: Athletics
- Event: High jump

Katsumi Fukura (福良 勝己, Fukura Katsumi; born 21 February 1953) is a Japanese athlete. He competed in the men's high jump at the 1976 Summer Olympics.
