= Robert Forget =

Canadian athlete

Personal information
- Born: 15 January 1955 Montreal, Quebec, Canada
- Died: 20 December 2005 (aged 50)

Sport
- Sport: Athletics
- Event: High jump

Robert Forget (15 January 1955 – 20 December 2005) was a Canadian athlete. He competed in the men's high jump at the 1976 Summer Olympics.
