= Oscar Raise =

Italian high jumper

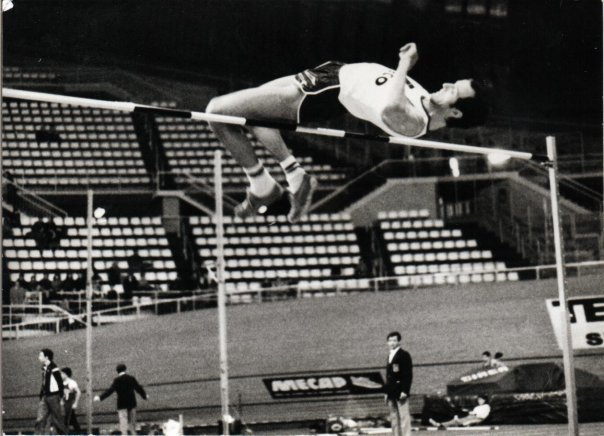

Personal information
- Nationality: Italian
- Born: 19 February 1952 (age 74) Gassino, Italy
- Height: 1.86 m (6 ft 1 in)
- Weight: 72 kg (159 lb)

Sport
- Country: Italy
- Sport: Athletics
- Event: High jump
- Club: Fiat Torino

Achievements and titles
- Personal best: High jump: 2.27 m (1979)
Medal record
Mediterranean Games
Silver medal – second place	1979 Split	High jump

Oscar Raise (born 19 February 1952) is a retired Italian high jumper.

== Biography ==
He finished sixth at the 1978 European Indoor Championships and won the silver medal at the 1979 Mediterranean Games. He also competed at the 1976 Summer Olympics without reaching the final.

His personal best jump is 2.27 metres, achieved on 19 September 1979 in Bologna, setting a new Italian record on the same day in which we were able Massimo Di Giorgio and Bruno Bruni (exceptional event for athletics).

== National records ==
- High jump: 2.23 m ( (Italy) Milan, 4 February 1978)
- High jump: 2.24 m ( (Czech Republic) Třinec, 3 March 1978)
- High jump: 2.27 m ( (Italy) Bologna, 19 September 1979)

== National titles ==
Oscar Raise has won one time the individual national championship.

- 1 win in High jump (1981)

== See also ==
- Men's high jump Italian record progression
- List on national champions in the men's high jump
- Italian all-time lists - High jump
