= Jaroslav Alexa =

Czech high jumper

Personal information
- Nationality: Czech
- Born: 6 July 1949 Brno, Czechoslovakia
- Died: 5 August 2008 (aged 59) Mariánské Lázně, Czech Republic

Sport
- Sport: Athletics
- Event: High jump

Jaroslav Alexa (6 July 1949 – 5 August 2008) was a Czech athlete. He competed in the men's high jump at the 1968 Summer Olympics and the 1972 Summer Olympics.
