= Marc Romersa =

Luxembourgish high jumper

Personal information
- Nationality: Luxembourgish
- Born: 1 February 1956 (age 70)

Sport
- Sport: Athletics
- Event: High jump

Marc Romersa (born 1 February 1956) is a Luxembourgish athlete. He competed in the men's high jump at the 1976 Summer Olympics.
