= Angelo Tonini =

Italian long and high jumper

Personal information
- Nationality: Italian
- Born: 26 November 1888 Arezzo, Italy
- Died: 18 February 1974 (aged 85) Milan, Italy

Sport
- Country: Italy
- Sport: Athletics
- Events: High jump Long jump
- Club: US Milanese

Achievements and titles
- Personal best: Long jump: 7.00 (1912)

Angelo Tonini (November 26, 1888 – February 18, 1974) was an Italian long jumper.

== Biography ==
He competed in the 1912 Summer Olympics. He was born in Arezzo and died in Milan. In 1912 he finished 19th in the long jump competition. He also competed in the high jump event but he was unable to clear a height.

== Achievements ==
| Year | Competition | Venue | Position | Event | Performance | Note |
|---|---|---|---|---|---|---|
| 1912 | Olympic Games | (Sweden) Stockholm | 19th | Long jump | 6.44 m | |
| 1912 | Olympic Games | (Sweden) Stockholm | Qual. | High jump | - | |

== See also ==
- Men's high jump Italian record progression
- Italy at the 1912 Summer Olympics
