= Irajá Cecy =

Brazilian high jumper

Personal information
- Full name: Irajá Chedid Cecy
- Born: 18 May 1955 (age 71) Curitiba, Brazil
- Height: 1.82 m (6 ft 0 in)
- Weight: 73 kg (161 lb)

Sport
- Sport: Athletics
- Event: High jump

Irajá Chedid Cecy (born 18 May 1955) is a Brazilian athlete. He competed in the men's high jump at the 1976 Summer Olympics.

His personal best in the event is 2.12 metres set in 1976.

== International competitions ==
Year	Competition	Venue	Position	Notes
Representing Brazil
1976	Olympic Games	Montreal, Canada	–	NM
1977	South American Championships	Montevideo, Uruguay	1st	2.05 m
1979	South American Championships	Bucaramanga, Colombia	3rd	2.09 m
