= Roberto Galli =

Italian gymnast

- Born: 26 April 1973 (age 53) Gallarate, Italy

Gymnastics career
- Discipline: Men's artistic gymnastics
- Country represented: Italy
- Gym: Virtus Gallarate

Roberto Galli (born 26 April 1973) is an Italian gymnast. He finished in twenty-eighth place in the all around at the 1996 Summer Olympics.
