= Bill Jankunis =

American high jumper (born 1955)

Personal information
- Nationality: American
- Born: June 29, 1955 (age 71)
- Home town: Staten Island, New York

Sport
- Sport: Athletics
- Event: High jump

William John Jankunis (born June 29, 1955) is an American athlete. He competed in the men's high jump at the 1976 Summer Olympics. Jankunis won the 1976 United States Summer Olympic High Jump Trials on June 28, 1976, at University of Oregon's Hayward Stadium with a jump of 2.28 metres (7 ft. 5 3/4 in).

He briefly competed for the Colorado Buffaloes track and field team, but dropped out after his sophomore year due to his father's illness. While at Colorado he was a high jump All-American, placing 4th at the 1974 NCAA Indoor Track and Field Championships.

As a resident of Midland Beach, Jankunis attended New Dorp High School in New Dorp, Staten Island, New York. He was inducted into the Staten Island Sports Hall of Fame in 1996.
