= Jacek Wszoła =

Polish high jumper

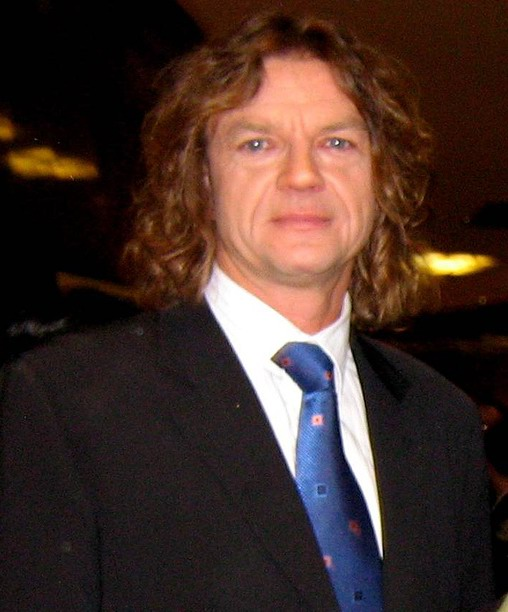
- Jacek Wszoła in 2007

Personal information
- Born: 30 December 1956 (age 69) Warsaw, Polish People's Republic
- Height: 1.95 m (6 ft 5 in)
- Weight: 75 kg (165 lb)

Sport
- Sport: Athletics
- Event: High jump
- Club: AZS Warszawa
- Coached by: Stanisław Janowski; Roman Wszoła
Medal record
Men's athletics
Representing Poland
Olympic Games
Gold medal – first place	1976 Montreal	High jump
Silver medal – second place	1980 Moscow	High jump
European Indoor Championships
Gold medal – first place	1977 San Sebastián	High jump
Silver medal – second place	1980 Sindelfingen	High jump
European Junior Championships
Gold medal – first place	1975 Athens	High jump
Universiade
Gold medal – first place	1977 Sofia	High jump

Jacek Roman Wszoła (born 30 December 1956 in Warsaw, Poland) is a retired Polish high jumper best known for winning gold and silver medals at the 1976 and 1980 Summer Olympics respectively. Wszoła is also a one-time world record holder with the result of 2.35 metres.

== Biography ==
With his father Roman being an athletics coach, Jacek Wszoła was close to the sport since a very young age. He, eventually, also gave it a try – initially training for the hurdles before switching to high jump.

Wszoła started competing in 1971 and by 1974, aged just 17, made his first national senior team for the 1974 European Championships in Rome, finishing fifth. His first international title came a year later in Athens where he became the European Junior Champion.

Wszoła, then 19 years old, caused a big surprise at the 1976 Summer Olympics in Montreal. Competing in heavy rain, he managed to win over more favoured athletes. Incidentally, shortly before the games his father-coach made him train on wet tartan to prepare him for such circumstances.

Following his success in the Olympic year, Wszoła won gold medals at the 1977 European Indoor Championships in San Sebastián and the 1977 Summer Universiade in Sofia. He also finished second in Final A of that year's European Cup. The following season was much less successful as he only managed seventh place at the 1978 European Indoor Championships in Milan and fourth at the 1978 European Championships in Prague.

In 1980, soon before the Olympics, Wszoła was back in form, breaking the world record with 2.35 metres. At the Moscow Olympics, he finished second behind the East German Gerd Wessig, who also beat Wszoła's world record by one centimetre. One month after the Olympics Wszoła was seriously injured at a domestic meet in Poznań, tearing ligaments in his ankle, which ruled him out of the sport for 18 months. Wszoła was never able to regain his old form.

After missing out the entire 1981 season, Wszoła made a comeback in 1982 competing at the 1982 European Championships in Athens where he got into a dispute with his national federation. After the qualification round, it was noticed that he was competing in shoes of a different manufacturer than was then the official sponsor of the Polish team. As Wszoła refused to compete in the shoes provided by his federation he was not allowed to start in the final and was sent back home. For this infringement Wszoła was disqualified for six months.

The following year was also not very successful with Wszoła finishing only 11th in his last Universiade in Edmonton and 13th in the inaugural World Championships in Helsinki. In 1984 Poland, under pressure from the Soviet Union, boycotted the Los Angeles Olympic Games instead sending its athletes to the alternative competition, the Friendship Games in Moscow. The competition took place in a pouring rain and Wszoła, having witnessed one of the athletes break an arm, decided to fake an injury to avoid a real one.

His last major international outing was the 1987 European Indoor Championships, where he only managed eleventh place. The following year, he failed to make the Polish team for the 1988 Summer Olympics. Wszoła finished his professional career in 1989, although he later competed in masters competitions, among others winning the M40 category at the 1997 European Masters Championships.

== Personal life ==
His wife Krystyna was also an athlete. They have two children, Jacek and Anna.

== International competitions ==
Year	Competition	Venue	Position	Notes
Representing Poland
1974	European Championships	Rome, Italy	5th	2.19 m
1975	European Indoor Championships	Katowice, Poland	11th	2.16 m
1975	European Junior Championships	Athens, Greece	1st	2.22 m
1976	Olympic Games	Montreal, Canada	1st	2.25 m
1977	European Indoor Championships	San Sebastián, Spain	1st	2.25 m
1977	Universiade	Sofia, Bulgaria	1st	2.22 m
1977	World Cup	Düsseldorf, West Germany	3rd	2.24 m^{1}
1978	European Indoor Championships	Milan, Italy	7th	2.21 m
1978	European Championships	Prague, Czechoslovakia	6th	2.21 m
1979	World Cup	Montreal, Canada	2nd	2.27 m
1979	Universiade	Mexico City, Mexico	4th	2.26 m
1980	European Indoor Championships	Sindelfingen, West Germany	2nd	2.29 m
1980	Olympic Games	Moscow, Soviet Union	2nd	2.31 m
1982	European Championships	Athens, Greece	3rd (q)	2.21 m^{2}
1983	Universiade	Edmonton, Canada	11th	2.20 m
1983	World Championships	Helsinki, Finland	13th	2.23 m
1984	Friendship Games	Moscow, Soviet Union	4th	2.15 m
1987	European Indoor Championships	Liévin, France	11th	2.20 m

^{1}Representing Europe
^{2}Did not start in the final

Records
Preceded by (Soviet Union) Vladimir Yashchenko	Men's High Jump World Record Holder; 2m35 equalled by Dietmar Mögenburg on 1980-05-26; 1980-05-25 – 1980-08-01	Succeeded by (East Germany) Gerd Wessig
