= Jüri Tarmak =

Estonian high jumper (1946–2022)

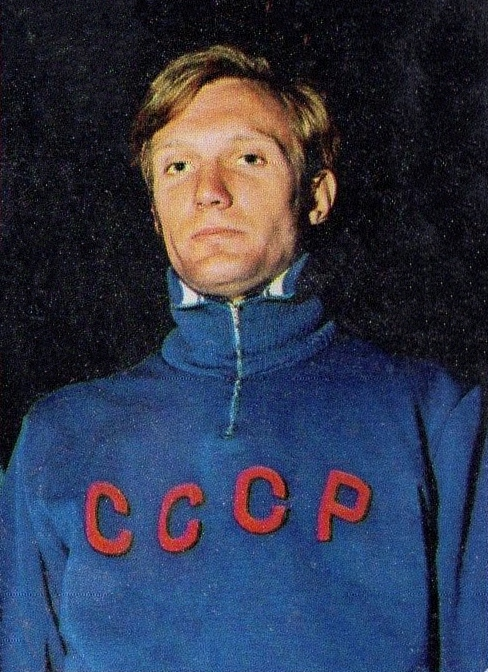
- Tarmak c. 1972

Personal information
- Born: 21 July 1946 Tallinn, then part of Estonian SSR, Soviet Union
- Died: 22 June 2022 (aged 75)
- Height: 193 cm (6 ft 4 in)
- Weight: 75 kg (165 lb)

Sport
- Sport: Athletics
- Event: High jump
- Club: Dynamo Leningrad

Achievements and titles
- Personal best: 2.25 m (1972)
Medal record
Men's athletics
Representing Soviet Union
Olympic Games
Gold medal – first place	1972 Munich	High jump
European Indoor Championships
Silver medal – second place	1971 Sofia	High jump
Bronze medal – third place	1972 Grenoble	High jump

Jüri Tarmak (21 July 1946 – 22 June 2022) was an Estonian high jumper who competed for the Soviet Union.

== Career ==
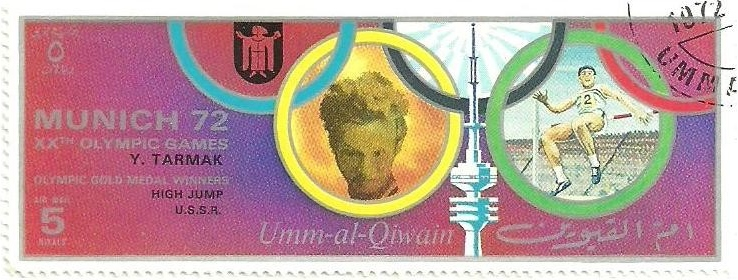
Tarmak on a stamp of Umm al-Quwain

Tarmak took up athletics in 1963, following his father Aadu Tarmak, who was the Soviet champion in the discus throw in 1943–44. In 1970 he became a member of the Soviet national team. He won a silver and a bronze medal at the European Indoor Championships in 1971 and 1972, and an Olympic gold medal in 1972. Tarmak was the last Olympic champion in the men's high jump to use the straddle technique. In 1974 he retired from competitions, and next year graduated in economics from the Saint Petersburg State University. In 1985 he defended a PhD in economics and from 1985 to 1990 lectured at the same university. After the breakup of the Soviet Union he returned to his native Estonia where in 1990 founded an investment company. He later became a vice-president and consultant with the Tallinn Stock Exchange. He remained involved with sport and between 2001 and 2012 headed the sports club Tallinna Kompass.

Sporting positions
Preceded by (United States) Pat Matzdorf	Men's High Jump Best Year Performance; 1972	Succeeded by (United States) Dwight Stones
