= Walter Boller =

German high jumper

Personal information
- Nationality: German
- Born: 20 May 1951 (age 75) Küssaberg-Reckingen, West Germany

Sport
- Sport: Athletics
- Event: High jump
- Club: USC Mainz
Medal record
Men's athletics
Representing West Germany
European Indoor Championships
Bronze medal – third place	1976 Munich	High jump

Walter Boller (born 20 May 1951) is a German athlete. He competed in the men's high jump at the 1976 Summer Olympics, representing West Germany.

At the West German championships, Boller won his first medal in 1973, a silver, followed by three straight gold medals in 1974, 1975 and 1976. In the same three years he also became West German indoor champion. He represented the club USC Mainz.
