= Bruno Bruni (athlete) =

Italian high jumper

Personal information
- Nationality: Italian
- Born: 25 September 1955 (age 70) San Vito al Tagliamento, Italy

Sport
- Country: Italy
- Sport: Athletics
- Event: High jump

Achievements and titles
- Personal best: High jump: 2.27 m (1979)

Bruno Bruni (born 25 September 1955) is a retired Italian high jumper.

== Biography ==
He finished fifth at the 1977 European Indoor Championships, eleventh at the 1978 European Indoor Championships and eleventh at the 1980 European Indoor Championships. His personal best jump is 2.27 metres, achieved in September 1979 in Bologna.

His personal best jump is 2.27 metres, achieved on 19 September 1979 in Bologna, setting a new Italian record on the same day in which we were able Massimo Di Giorgio and Oscar Raise (exceptional event for athletics).

== National records ==
- High jump: 2.27 m ( (Italy) Bologna, 19 September 1979)

== See also ==
- Men's high jump Italian record progression
