= Serhiy Senyukov =

Soviet high jumper

Medal record

Men's athletics

Representing Soviet Union

European Indoor Championships
Gold medal – first place	1976 Munich	High jump

Serhiy Senyukov (Ukrainian: Сергій Васильович Сенюков; 27 January 1955 – 1 September 1992) was a high jumper who represented the Soviet Union. He trained at Spartak.

== Achievements ==
Year	Tournament	Venue	Result	Extra
1973	European Junior Championships	Duisburg, West Germany	2nd	
1976	European Indoor Championships	Munich, West Germany	1st	
	Olympic Games	Montreal, Canada	5th	
1978	European Indoor Championships	Milan, Italy	5th	
