= Endre Kelemen =

Hungarian high jumper

Personal information
- Born: 5 December 1947 (age 78) Tura, Hungary

Sport
- Sport: Track and field
Medal record
Representing Hungary
European Indoor Championships
Silver medal – second place	1975 Katowice	High jump
Bronze medal – third place	1971 Sofia	High jump

Endre Kelemen (born 5 December 1947) is a retired Hungarian high jumper. He won two medals at the European Indoor Championships, in 1971 and 1975, and competed once at the Olympic Games, in 1976.

== Career ==
He was born in Tura. His international breakthrough came at the 1971 European Indoor Championships in Sofia. All three medalists jumped 2.17, and Kelemen got the bronze medal on countback. At the 1975 European Indoor Championships, Kelemen won the silver medal with a jump of 2.19 metres. He was two centimetres behind gold medallist Vladimír Malý, but beat Rune Almén, Aleksandr Grigoryev, Paul Poaniewa and Rolf Beilschmidt, who all achieved 2.19, on countback. At the 1975 European Indoor Championships, Major only managed a sixteenth place, jumping 2.13 metres. He competed at the 1976 Summer Olympics, but did not reach the final round.

Kelemen became Hungarian high jump champion in 1970, 1971, 1974 and 1975, rivalling with Ádám Szepesi and István Major. He also became indoor champion in 1974, 1975 and 1976.

His personal best jump was 2.23 metres, achieved in 1976.
