= Jesper Tørring =

Danish athlete (born 1947)

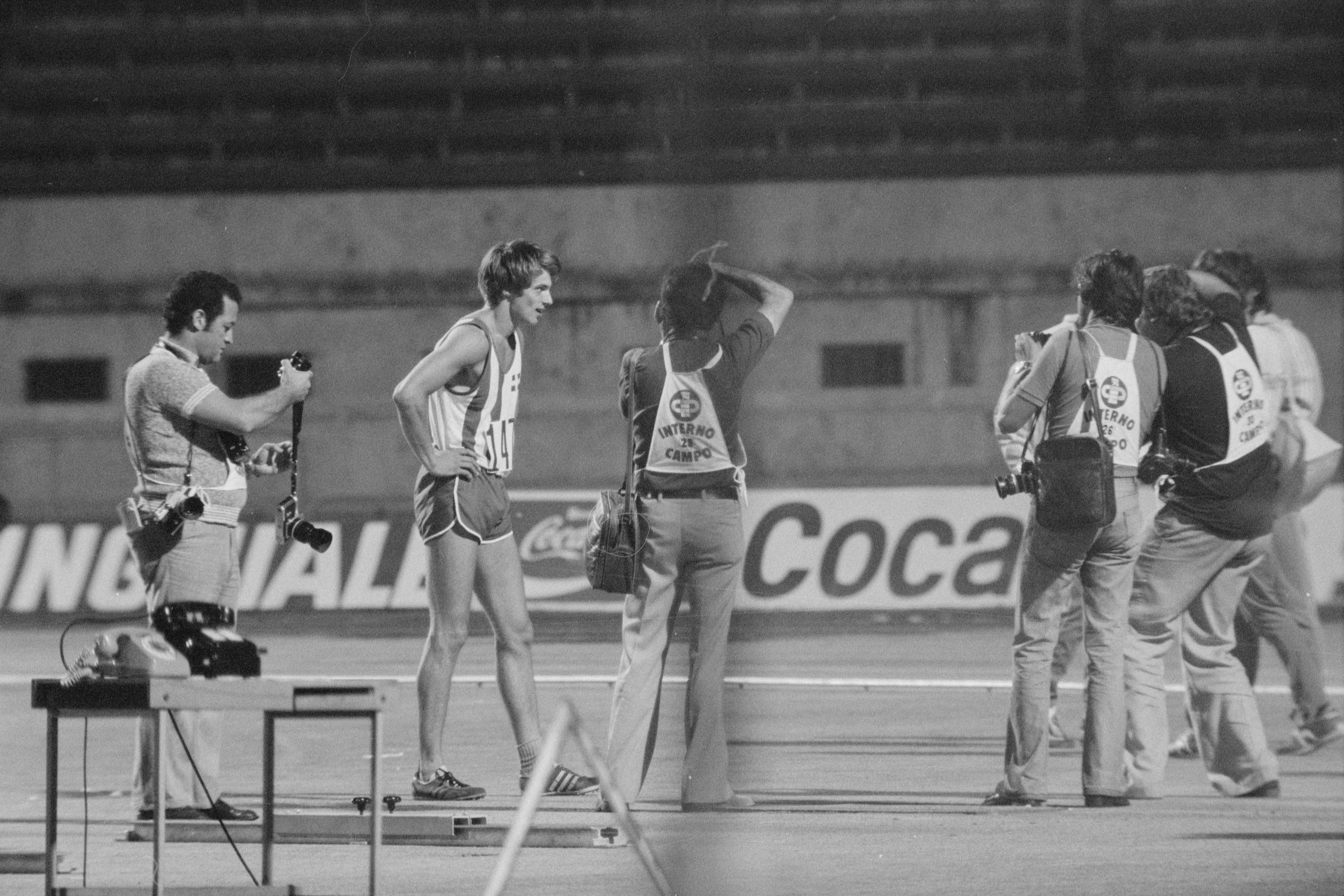
- Jesper Tørring at the 1974 European Athletics Championships in Rome

Medal record

Men's athletics

Representing Denmark

European Championships
Gold medal – first place	1974 Rome	High jump

Jesper Tørring (born 27 September 1947 in Randers) is a Danish former athlete who competed in 110 metres hurdles and long jump at the 1972 Summer Olympics and in high jump at the 1976 Summer Olympics.
