= Rodolfo Bergamo =

Italian high jumper

Personal information
- Nationality: Italian
- Born: August 23, 1955 (age 70) Venezia, Italy
- Height: 1.78 m (5 ft 10 in)
- Weight: 70 kg (154 lb)

Sport
- Country: Italy
- Sport: Athletics
- Event: High jump
- Club: C.S. Carabinieri

Achievements and titles
- Personal best: High jump: 2.24 m (1978)

Rodolfo Bergamo (born 23 August 1955 in Venezia) is a retired Italian high jumper.

== Biography ==
He finished sixth at the 1976 Olympic Games, this was, until Gianmarco Tamberi gold medal at the 2020 Olympic Games, the best performance for an Italian high jumper at the Summer Olympics like Giacomo Crosa, now journalist, at 1968 Summer Olympics.

His personal best jump is 2.24 metres, achieved in July 1978 in Rome.

== National records ==
- High jump: 2.22 m ( (Italy) Milan, 8 June 1976)
- High jump: 2.24 m ( (Italy) Rome, 25 July 1978)

== Achievements ==
| Year | Competition | Venue | Position | Event | Performance | Notes |
|---|---|---|---|---|---|---|
| 1976 | Olympic Games | (Canada) Montreal | 6th | High jump | 2.18 m | |

== National titles ==
Rodolfo Bergamo has won 3 times the individual national championship.

- Italian Athletics Championships
  - High jump: 1977, 1978

== See also ==
- Men's high jump Italian record progression
