= Valentin Gavrilov =

Russian high jumper

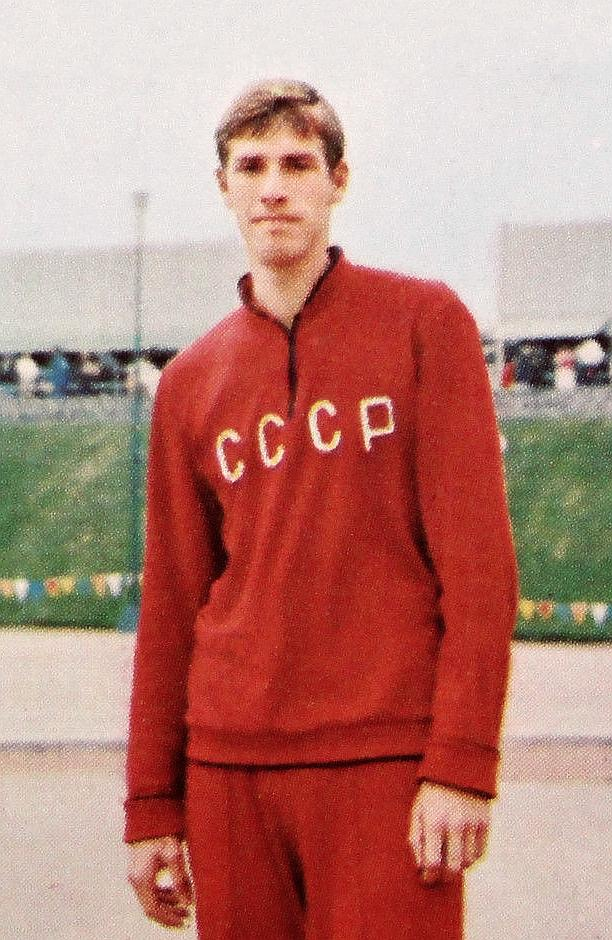
- Valentin Gavrilov in 1968

Personal information
- Born: 26 July 1946 Moscow, Russian SFSR, USSR
- Died: 23 December 2003 (aged 57) Moscow, Russia
- Height: 1.91 m (6 ft 3 in)
- Weight: 75 kg (165 lb)

Sport
- Sport: Athletics
- Event: High jump
- Club: Dynamo Moscow

Achievements and titles
- Personal best: 2.21 m (1969)
Medal record
Men's athletics
Representing Soviet Union
Olympic Games
Bronze medal – third place	1968 Mexico City	High jump
European Championships
Gold medal – first place	1969 Athens	High jump
European Indoor Games
Gold medal – first place	1969 Belgrade	High jump
Gold medal – first place	1970 Vienna	High jump
Silver medal – second place	1968 Madrid	High jump
Universiade
Gold medal – first place	1970 Torino	High jump
Bronze medal – third place	1973 Moscow	High jump

Valentin Aleksandrovich Gavrilov (Russian: Валентин Александрович Гаврилов, 26 July 1946 – 23 December 2003) was a Russian high jumper who won a bronze medal at the 1968 Olympics. That year he also finished second at the European Indoor Games, but in 1969–70 he won his all international competitions, including European championships (indoor and outdoor) and the Universiade.
