= Massimo Di Giorgio =

Italian high jumper (born 1958)

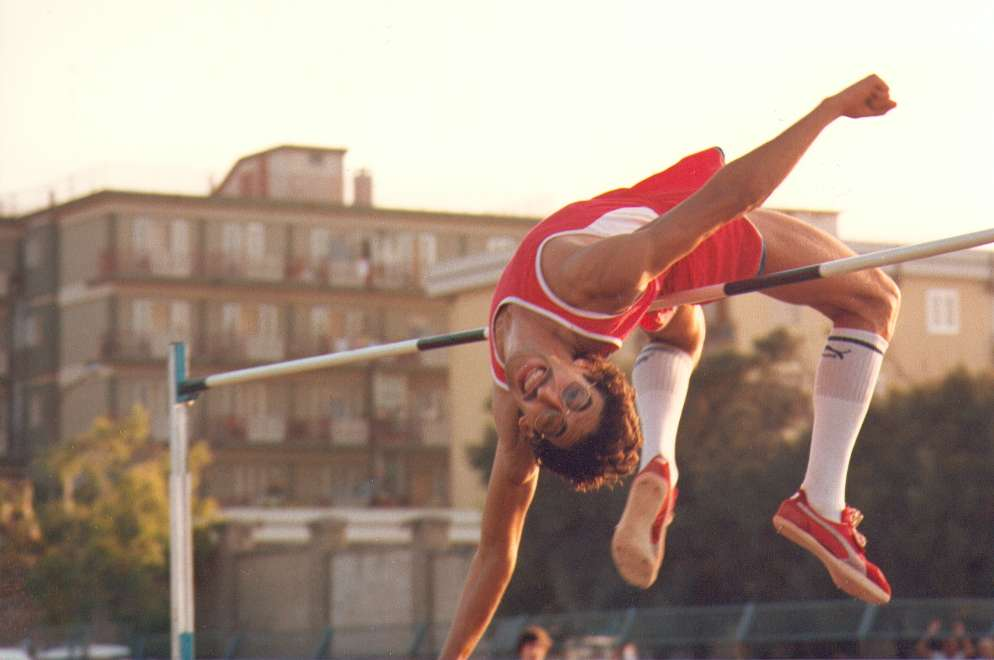

Personal information
- National team: Italy 25 caps (78-83)
- Born: 22 March 1958 (age 68) Verona, Italy
- Height: 1.92 m (6 ft 4 in)
- Weight: 78 kg (172 lb)

Sport
- Country: Italy
- Sport: Athletics
- Event: High jump
- Club: Fiamme Oro Padova

Achievements and titles
- Personal best: High jump: 2.30 m (1981)
Medal record
Event	1st	2nd	3rd
European Indoor Championships	0	0	1
Mediterranean Games	1	0	0
European Cup	0	0	1
Total	1	0	2
European Indoor Championships
Bronze medal – third place	1983 Budapest	High Jump
European Cup
Bronze medal – third place	European Cup	1981 Zagreb]
Mediterranean Games
Gold medal – first place	1979 Split	High Jump

Massimo Di Giorgio (born 22 March 1958) is a former Italian high jumper, who won three medals at senior level at the International athletics competitions.

== Biography ==
He finished fifteenth at the 1978 European Indoor Championships, won the gold medal at the 1979 Mediterranean Games and won a bronze medal at the 1983 European Indoor Championships. His personal best jump is 2.30 metres, achieved in June 1981 in Udine.

=== 1980 Moscow Olympics boycott ===
Italian athletes serving in its military corps could not attend the Games, however, because of the national government's official support of the boycott. In 1980 Massimo Di Giorgio, like other leading Italian athletes (the swimmer Marcello Guarducci, the modern pentathlete Daniele Masala and the judoka Ezio Gamba) who in Moscow in 1980 would have had medal ambitions, could not participate in those Olympic Games because belonged to military bodies. Ezio Gamba resigned from the military body in time and was able to participate in the Games under the IOC flag, it was not so for the others.

The day when the winners of the Olympic gold medals, Pietro Mennea, Sara Simeoni and Maurizio Damilano were appointed Knights of the Italian Republic by the Italian President Sandro Pertini, Di Giorgio and Guarducci went to protest at the Quirinale because they believed that they too would have to have equal recognition.

=== The candidacy for President of FIDAL ===
In 2004, at the age of 46, Massimo di Giorgio decided to propose his candidacy as President of the Italian Athletics Federation (FIDAL), he was then defeated by the former Italian middle-distance runner Franco Arese.

== National records ==
- High jump: 2.25 m ( (Socialist Federal Republic of Yugoslavia) Nova Gorica, 15 April 1979)
- High jump: 2.26 m ( (Italy) Udine, 20 May 1979)
- High jump: 2.27 m ( (Italy) Bologna, 19 September 1979)
- High jump: 2.29 m ( (Italy) Pisa, 5 July 1980)
- High jump: 2.30 m ( (Italy) Udine, 15 June 1981) since 21 July 1988 (Luca Toso sets 2.32 m)

== Achievements ==
Year	Competition	Venue	Position	Event	Time	Notes
1979	European Indoor Championships	(Austria) Vienna	9th	High jump	2.18 m	
1979	European Cup	(Italy) Turin	4th	High jump	2.24 m	
1979	Mediterranean Games	(Socialist Federal Republic of Yugoslavia) Split	1st	High jump	2.26 m	CR
1981	European Cup	(Socialist Federal Republic of Yugoslavia) Zagreb	3rd	High jump	2.26 m	
1981	World Cup	(Italy) Rome	6th	High jump	2.15 m	(Note: At the fiisrt edion of the IAAF World Cup the Italy team was invited as the organizing country.)
1982	European Indoor Championships	(Italy) Milan	8th	High jump	2.22 m	
1983	European Indoor Championships	(Hungary) Budapest	3rd	High jump	2.27 m	PB (Note: Ex-aequo with the Polish Mirosław Włodarczyk.)

== National titles ==
Massimo Di Giorgio has won 7 times the individual national championship.

- Italian Athletics Championships
  - High jump: 1979, 1980, 1982 (3)
- Italian Athletics Indoor Championships
  - High jump: 1978, 1979, 1982, 1983 (4)

== See also ==
- Men's high jump Italian record progression
- Italian all-time top lists - High jump
