= Kęstutis Šapka =

Lithuanian high jumper (1949–2025)

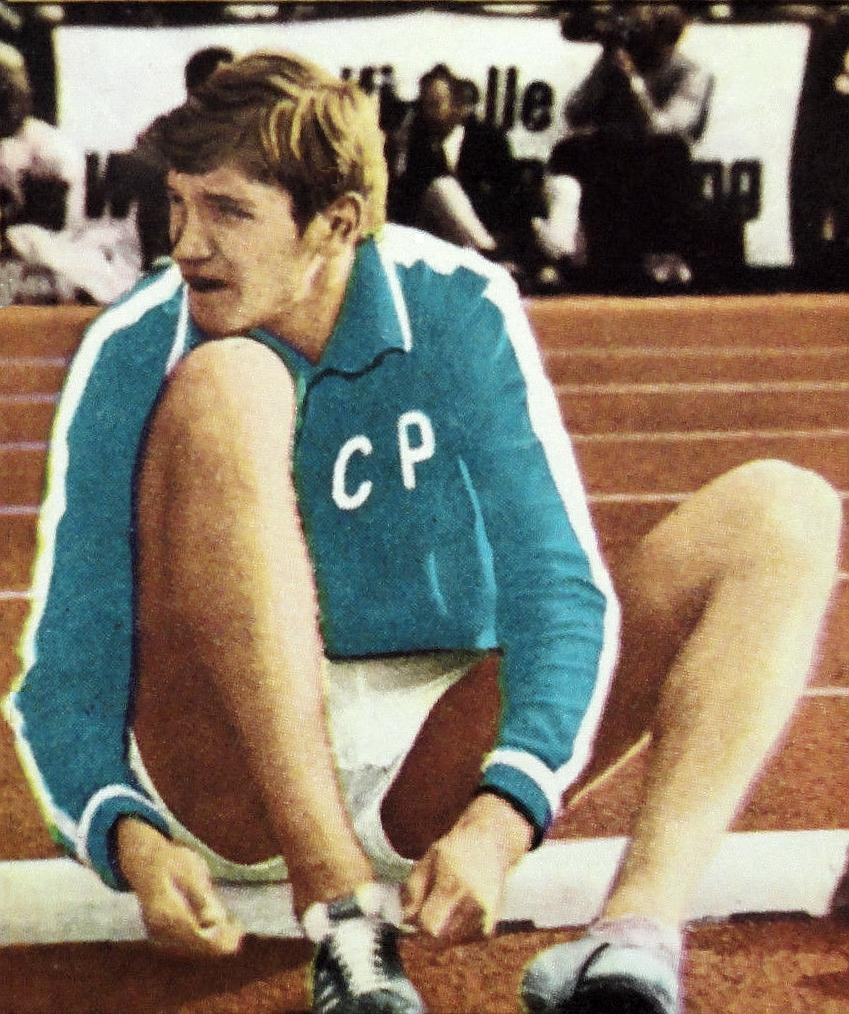

Personal information
- Nationality: Lithuanian
- Born: 15 November 1949 Vilnius, Lithuanian SSR, USSR
- Died: 11 October 2025 (aged 75) Vilnius, Lithuania
- Height: 191 cm (6 ft 3 in)
- Weight: 85 kg (187 lb)

Sport
- Sport: Athletics
- Event: High jump
- Club: Dynamo Vilnius

Achievements and titles
- Personal best: 2.25 m (1974)
Medal record
Men's athletics
Representing Soviet Union
European Championships
Gold medal – first place	1971 Helsinki	High jump
Silver medal – second place	1974 Rome	High jump
European Indoor Championships
Gold medal – first place	1974 Gothenburg	High jump
Silver medal – second place	1972 Grenoble	High jump

Kęstutis Šapka (15 November 1949 – 11 October 2025) was a Lithuanian high jumper who represented the Soviet Union. He was inspired to become a professional high jumper after the 1968 Summer Olympics in Mexico and became one of the early adopters of Fosbury Flop. He retired due to recurring injuries. After retiring from competitions he worked as a trainer in Vilnius. In 2007, he was ranked as top 16 trainer in track and field athletics.

Šapka died on 11 October 2025, at the age of 75.

== Achievements ==
Year	Competition	Venue	Position	Notes
Representing Soviet Union
1971	European Indoor Championships	Sofia, Bulgaria	6th	
	European Championships	Helsinki, Finland	1st	
1972	European Indoor Championships	Grenoble, France	2nd	
	Summer Olympics	Munich, West Germany	12th	
1974	European Indoor Championships	Gothenburg, Sweden	1st	
	European Championships	Rome, Italy	2nd	
