= Giordano Ferrari =

Italian high jumper

Personal information
- Nationality: Italian
- Born: 23 January 1956 (age 70) Fidenza, Italy

Sport
- Country: Italy
- Sport: Athletics
- Event: High jump

Achievements and titles
- Personal best: High jump: 2.20 m (1975)
Medal record
Mediterranean Games
Gold medal – first place	1975 Algiers	High Jump

Giordano Ferrari (born 23 January 1956) is a retired Italian high jumper. He won one medal, at senior level, at the International athletics competitions.

== Biography ==
He finished seventh at the 1975 European Indoor Championships and won the gold medal at the 1975 Mediterranean Games. His personal best jump is 2.20 metres, achieved in May 1975 in Fiorano Modenese. He has 8 caps in national team from 1974 to 1975.

== See also ==
- Men's high jump Italian record progression
