= Vasilios Papadimitriou =

Greek high jumper

Personal information
- Nationality: Greek
- Born: 21 May 1948 (age 78) Thessaloniki, Greece

Sport
- Sport: Athletics
- Event: High jump
Medal record
Men's athletics
Representing Greece
European Indoor Championships
Bronze medal – third place	1973 Rotterdam	High jump

Vasilios Papadimitriou (born 21 May 1948) is a Greek athlete. He competed in the men's high jump at the 1972 Summer Olympics. He was named the 1973 Greek Athlete of the Year.
