= Leif Roar Falkum =

Norwegian high jumper (born 1949)

Leif Roar Falkum (born 23 June 1949) is a retired Norwegian high jumper. He represented IK Tjalve during his active career.

He finished fifteenth at the 1973 European Indoor Championships, sixth at the 1974 European Championships, fifth at the 1976 European Indoor Championships and fourteenth at the 1976 Summer Olympics. He became Norwegian champion in the years 1971-1974 and 1976. His personal best jump was 2.20 metres, achieved in August 1976 in Molde.

After his retirement from active sports he became a known psychiatrist.
