= Rolf Beilschmidt =

East German high jumper

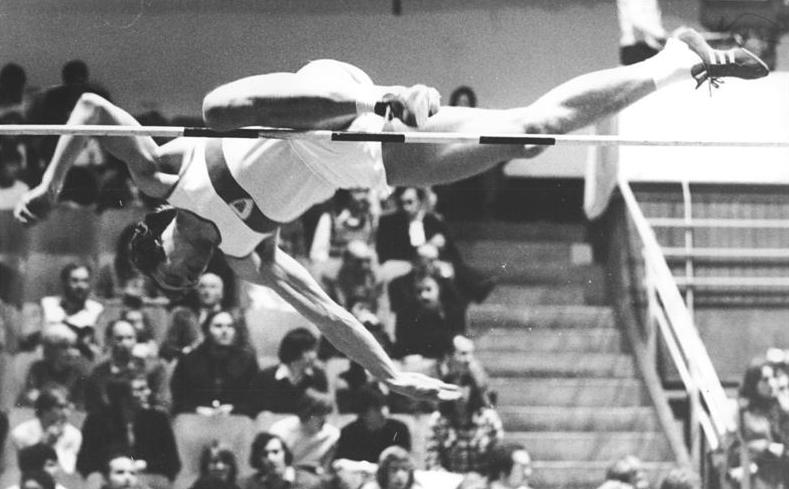
- Rolf Beilschmidt clearing 2.25 m in 1977

Medal record

Men's athletics

Representing East Germany

European Championships
Bronze medal – third place	1978 Prague	High jump

European Indoor Championships
Silver medal – second place	1977 San Sebastián	High jump
Silver medal – second place	1978 Milan	High jump

Rolf Beilschmidt (born 8 August 1953, in Jena) is a retired East German high jumper.

Beilschmidt represented the sports club SC Motor Jena, and became East German champion in 1974, 1975, 1976, 1977, 1978, 1979 and 1981.

Beilschmidt's personal best high jump was 2.31 metres, achieved in August 1977 in Helsinki.

Beilschmidt shares the decathlon world record in high jump with Christian Schenk at 2.27 m.

== Achievements ==
Year	Tournament	Venue	Result	Event
1975	European Indoor Championships	Katowice, Poland	6th	
1976	European Indoor Championships	Munich, West Germany	6th	
1976	Olympic Games	Montreal, Canada	7th	
1977	European Indoor Championships	San Sebastián, Spain	2nd	
1978	European Indoor Championships	Milan, Italy	2nd	
1978	European Championships	Prague, Czechoslovakia	3rd	

Awards
Preceded by (East Germany) Waldemar Cierpinski	East German Sportsman of the Year; 1977	Succeeded by (East Germany) Udo Beyer
