= Erminio Azzaro =

Italian high jumper (born 1948)

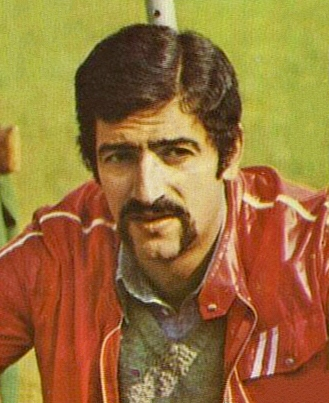

Personal information
- Nationality: Italian
- Born: 12 January 1948 (age 78) Pisciotta, Italy

Sport
- Country: Italy
- Sport: Athletics
- Event: High jump

Achievements and titles
- Personal best: 2.18 m (1971)
Medal record
Men's athletics
Representing Italy
European Championships
Bronze medal – third place	1969 Athens	High jump
Universiade
Silver medal – second place	1970 Turin	High jump

Erminio Azzaro (born 12 January 1948) is a retired Italian high jumper who won a bronze medal at the 1969 European Championships.

== Biography ==
Domestically he won the national high jump title six times: four times outdoors (1966, 1969–71) and twice indoors (1970–71).

His wife Sara Simeoni and son Roberto are also international high jumpers.

== National titles ==
- Italian Athletics Championships
  - High jump: 1966, 1969, 1970, 1971 (4)
- Italian Athletics Indoor Championships
  - High jump: 1970, 1971 (2)

== See also ==
- Men's high jump Italian record progression
