= 1976 European Athletics Indoor Championships =

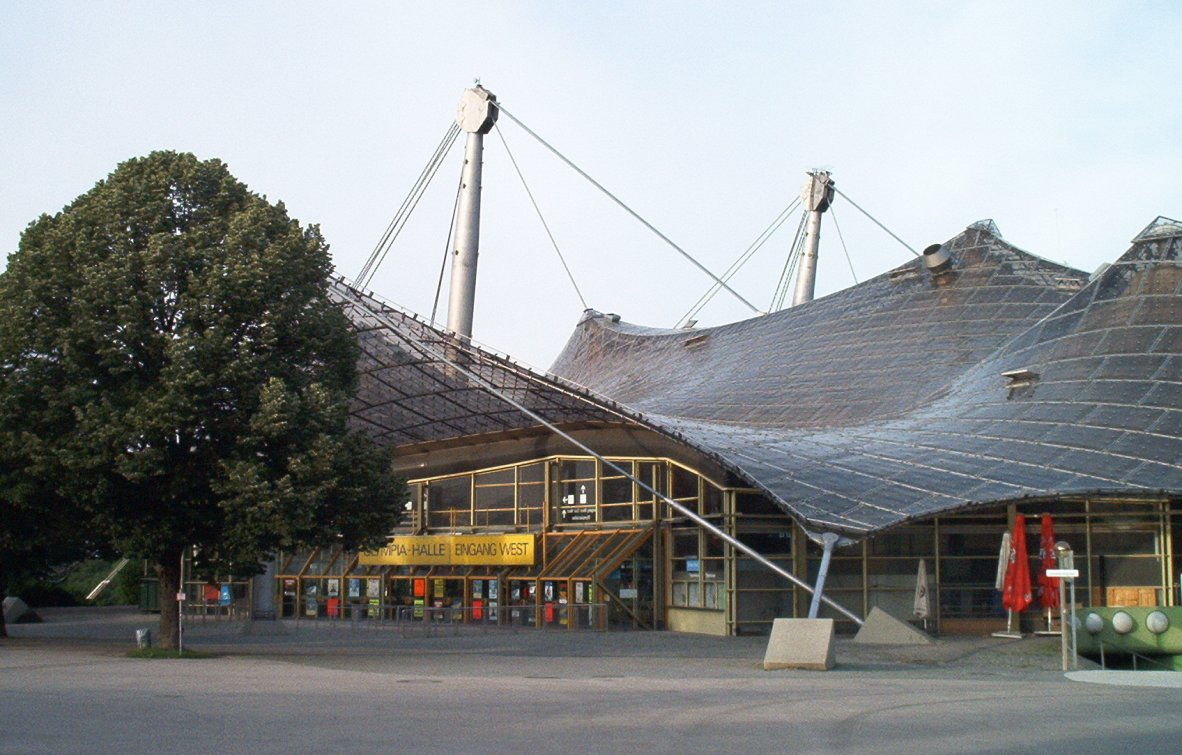
- Dates: 21–22 February 1976
- Host city: Munich; West Germany
- Venue: Olympiahalle
- Events: 19
- Participation: 226 athletes from 25 nations
- Records set: 1 WR, 7 CR

The 1976 European Athletics Indoor Championships were held at Olympiahalle in Munich, West Germany, in February 1976. The track used at this edition was 179 metres long.

== Medal summary ==
=== Men ===
Event	Gold		Silver		Bronze	
60 metres	Valeriy Borzov (URS)	6.58 =CR	Vassilios Papageorgopoulos (GRE)	6.67	Petar Petrov (BUL)	6.68
400 metres	Yanko Bratanov (BUL)	47.79	Hermann Köhler (FRG)	48.19	Grzegorz Mądry (POL)	48.46
800 metres	Ivo Van Damme (BEL)	1:49.2a	Josef Schmid (FRG)	1:49.8a	Milovan Savić (YUG)	1:49.9a
1500 metres	Paul-Heinz Wellmann (FRG)	3:45.1a	Thomas Wessinghage (FRG)	3:45.3a	Gheorghe Ghipu (ROM)	3:46.1a
3000 metres	Ingo Sensburg (FRG)	8:01.6a	Józef Ziubrak (POL)	8:02.0a	Ray Smedley (GBR)	8:02.2a
60 metres hurdles	Viktor Myasnikov (URS)	7.78	Berwyn Price (GBR)	7.80	Zbigniew Jankowski (POL)	7.92
High jump	Sergey Senyukov (URS)	2.22	Jacques Aletti (FRA)	2.19	Walter Boller (FRG)	2.19
Pole vault	Yuriy Prokhorenko (URS)	5.45 CR	Antti Kalliomäki (FIN)	5.40	Renato Dionisi (ITA)	5.30
Long jump	Jacques Rousseau (FRA)	7.90	Valeriy Podluzhniy (URS)	7.79	Joachim Busse (FRG)	7.72
Triple jump	Viktor Sanyeyev (URS)	17.10 CR	Carol Corbu (ROM)	16.75	Bernard Lamitié (FRA)	16.68
Shot put	Geoff Capes (GBR)	20.64	Gerd Lochmann (GDR)	20.29	Aleksandr Baryshnikov (URS)	20.02

=== Women ===
Event	Gold		Silver		Bronze	
60 metres	Linda Haglund (SWE)	7.24	Sonia Lannaman (GBR)	7.25	Elvira Possekel (FRG)	7.28
400 metres	Rita Wilden (FRG)	52.26 WR	Jelica Pavličić (YUG)	52.47	Inta Kļimoviča (URS)	52.80
800 metres	Nikolina Shtereva (BUL)	2:02.2a CR	Lilyana Tomova (BUL)	2:02.6a	Gisela Klein (FRG)	2:03.2a
1500 metres	Brigitte Kraus (FRG)	4:15.2a	Natalia Mărășescu (ROM)	4:15.6a	Rositsa Pekhlivanova (BUL)	4:15.8a
60 metres hurdles	Grażyna Rabsztyn (POL)	7.96 CR	Natalya Lebedeva (URS)	8.08	Bożena Nowakowska (POL)	8.14
High jump	Rosemarie Ackermann (GDR)	1.92 =CR	Ulrike Meyfarth (FRG)	1.89	Milada Karbanová (TCH)	1.89
Long jump	Lidiya Alfeyeva (URS)	6.64	Jarmila Nygrýnová (TCH)	6.57	Galina Gopchenko (URS)	6.48
Shot put	Ivanka Khristova (BUL)	20.45	Svetlana Krachevskaya (URS)	20.06	Ilona Schoknecht (GDR)	19.36

== Medal table ==
Rank	Nation	Gold	Silver	Bronze	Total
1	Soviet Union (URS)	6	3	3	12
2	West Germany (FRG)	4	4	4	12
3	Bulgaria (BUL)	3	1	2	6
4	Great Britain (GBR)	1	2	1	4
5	Poland (POL)	1	1	3	5
6	East Germany (GDR)	1	1	1	3
6	France (FRA)	1	1	1	3
8	Belgium (BEL)	1	0	0	1
8	Sweden (SWE)	1	0	0	1
10	Romania (ROU)	0	2	1	3
11	Czechoslovakia (TCH)	0	1	1	2
11	Yugoslavia (YUG)	0	1	1	2
13	Finland (FIN)	0	1	0	1
13	Greece (GRE)	0	1	0	1
15	Italy (ITA)	0	0	1	1
Totals (15 entries)		19	19	19	57

== Participating nations ==
- Austria (3)
- Belgium (7)
- Bulgaria (17)
- Czechoslovakia (14)
- Denmark (1)
- East Germany (8)
- Finland (6)
- France (22)
- Great Britain (7)
- Greece (10)
- Hungary (6)
- Iceland (1)
- Italy (4)
- Liechtenstein (2)
- Netherlands (3)
- Norway (1)
- Poland (25)
- Portugal (1)
- Romania (8)
- Soviet Union (28)
- Spain (6)
- Sweden (9)
- Switzerland (3)
- West Germany (30)
- Yugoslavia (4)
