= József Tihanyi =

Hungarian high jumper

Personal information
- Nationality: Hungarian
- Born: 31 October 1946 (age 79) Kaposvár, Hungary

Sport
- Sport: Athletics
- Event: High jump

József Tihanyi (born 31 October 1946) is a Hungarian athlete. He competed in the men's high jump at the 1972 Summer Olympics.
