= Enzo Del Forno =

Italian high jumper

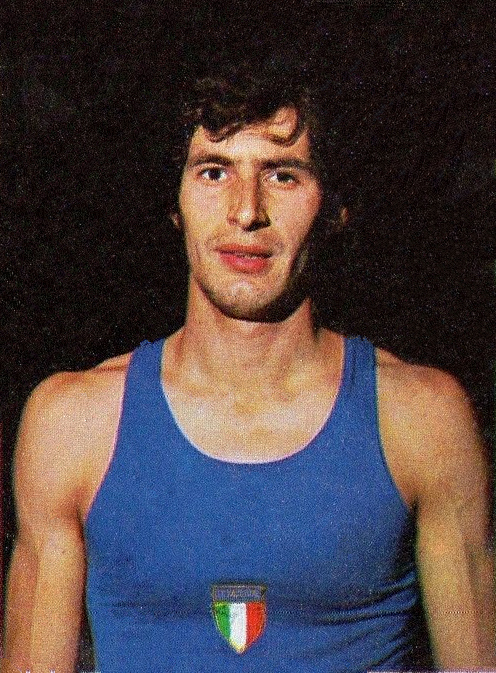
- Enzo Del Forno c. 1972

Personal information
- Nationality: Italian
- Born: 24 January 1950 (age 76) Colloredo di Monte Albano, Italy
- Height: 1.90 m (6 ft 3 in)
- Weight: 80 kg (176 lb)

Sport
- Country: Italy
- Sport: Athletics
- Event: High jump
- Club: Libertas Udine

Achievements and titles
- Personal best: 2.22 m (1975)
Medal record
Summer Universiade
Gold medal – first place	1975 Rome	High jump
Bronze medal – third place	1973 Moscow	High jump
Mediterranean Games
Silver medal – second place	1975 Algers	High jump

Enzo Del Forno (born 24 January 1950) is a retired Italian high jumper who won three medals at the International athletics competitions.

== Biography ==
Del Forno finished tenth at the 1972 Olympic Games and fifth at the 1974 European Indoor Championships. He then won a silver medal at the 1975 Mediterranean Games. At the Summer Universiade he won a bronze medal in 1973 and a gold in 1975.

Nationally Del Forno won five high jump titles, three outdoors (1973–1975) and two indoors (1973, 1974). His personal best jump is 2.22 metres, achieved in October 1975 in Siracusa.

== Olympic results ==
Year	Competition	Venue	Position	Event	Performance	Notes
1972	Olympic Games	(West Germany) Munich	10th	High jump	2.15 m	

== See also ==
- Men's high jump Italian record progression
