= Csaba Dosa =

Romanian high jumper

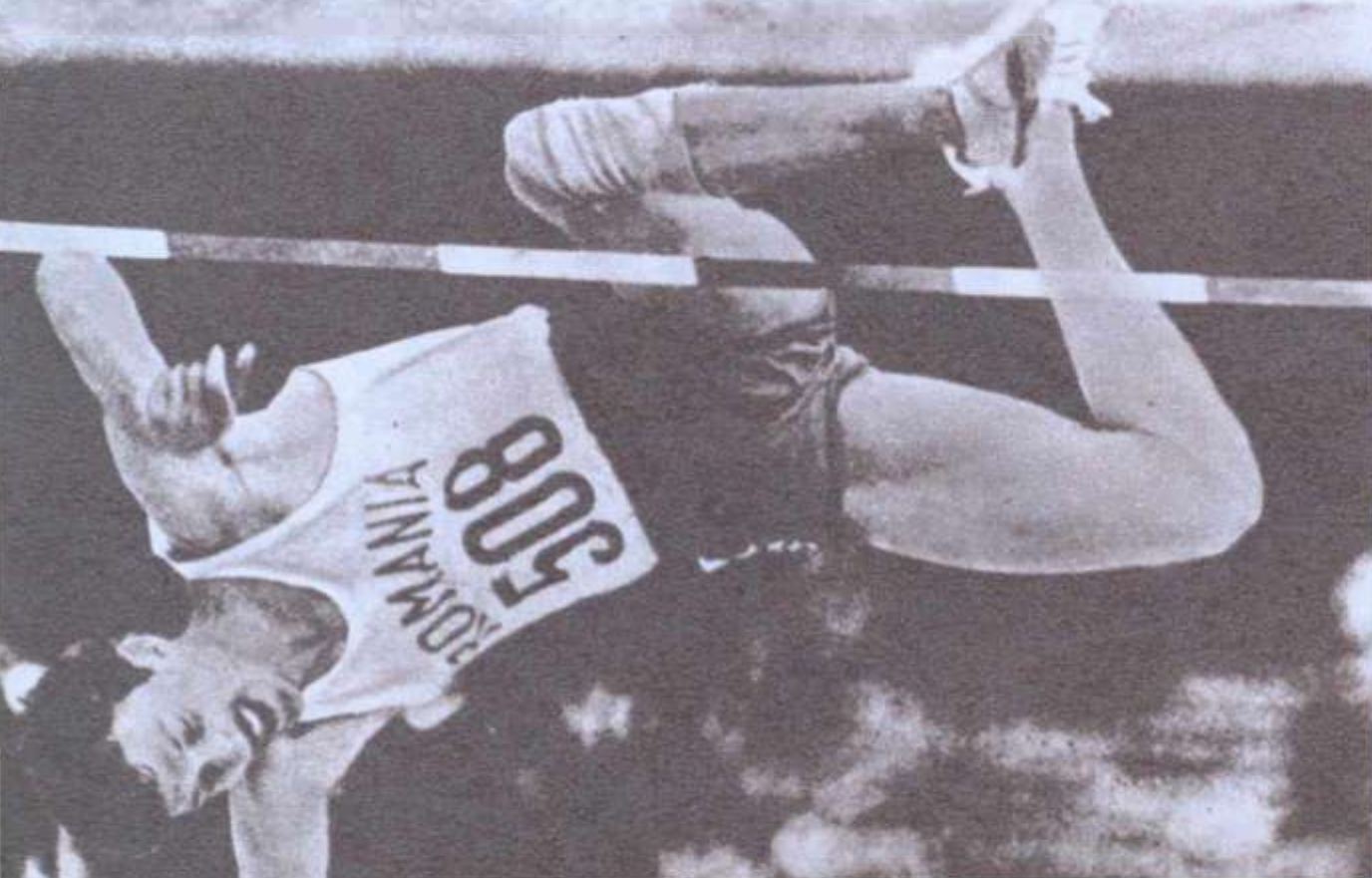
- Dosa in 1972

Personal information
- Nationality: Romanian
- Born: 31 January 1951 (age 75) Călugăreni, Giurgiu, Romania

Sport
- Sport: Athletics
- Event: High jump
Medal record
Men's athletics
Representing Romania
European Championships
Silver medal – second place	1971 Helsinki	High jump
Summer Universiade
Bronze medal – third place	1973 Moscow	High jump

Csaba Dosa (born 31 January 1951) is a Romanian athlete. He competed in the men's high jump at the 1968 Summer Olympics.
