= Jan Dahlgren =

Swedish high jumper

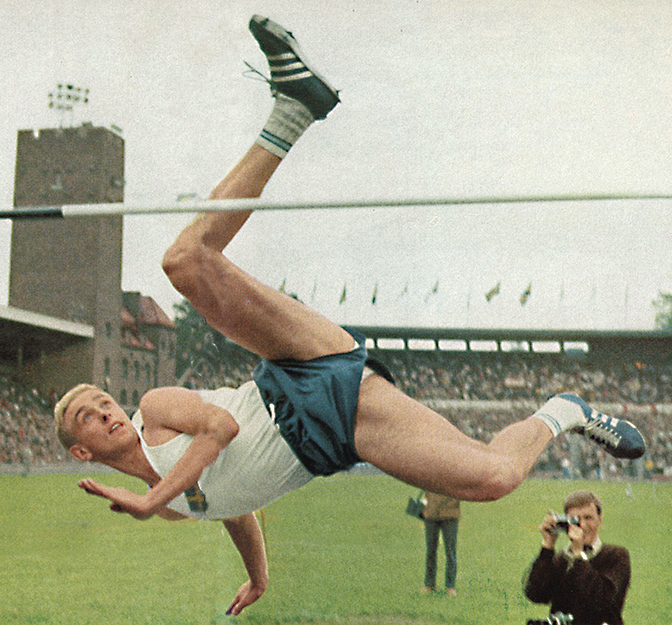
- Jan Dahlgren in 1967

Personal information
- Born: 19 February 1947 (age 79) Stockholm, Sweden
- Height: 1.86 m (6 ft 1 in)
- Weight: 74 kg (163 lb)

Sport
- Sport: Athletics
- Event: High jump
- Club: Westermalms IF; Turebergs IF; Österhaninge IF

Achievements and titles
- Personal best: 2.22 m (1972)

Jan Erik Fredrik Dahlgren (born 19 February 1947) is a retired Swedish high jumper. He competed at the 1966, 1969 and 1971 European championships and at the 1972 Summer Olympics, and finished in 10–14th place; he also placed fourth at the 1972 European Athletics Indoor Championships. Domestically Dahlgren won the Swedish title in 1971 and 1972 and set four national records, the last being 2.22 m in 1972.
