= Paul Poaniewa =

French high jumper

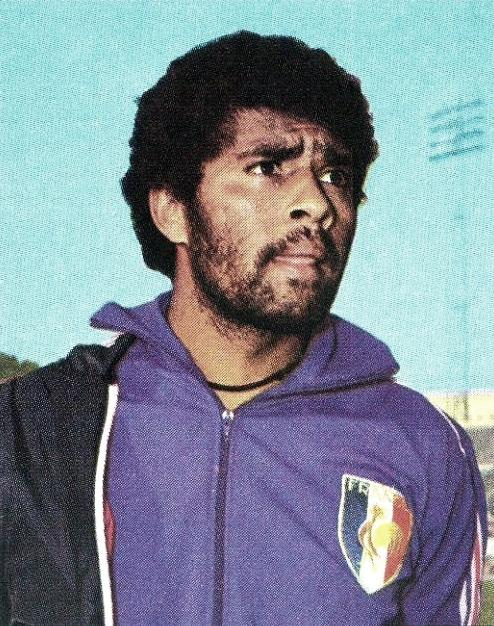
- Paul Poaniéwa (1976)

Personal information
- Nationality: French
- Born: 8 November 1953 (age 72) Nouméa, New Caledonia

Sport
- Sport: Athletics
- Event: High jump
Medal record
Representing France
Summer Universiade
Silver medal – second place	1977 Sofia	High jump
Representing New Caledonia
Pacific Games
Gold medal – first place	1979 Suva	High jump
Silver medal – second place	1975 Tumon	High jump

Paul Poaniewa (born 8 November 1953) is a retired French athlete. He competed in the men's high jump at the 1976 Summer Olympics.
