= Vladimír Malý =

Czech high jumper

Personal information
- Nationality: Czech
- Born: June 27, 1952 (age 74) Czechoslovakia

Sport
- Country: Czechoslovakia
- Sport: Athletics
- Event: High jump

Achievements and titles
- Personal best: High jump: 2.24 m (1975)
Medal record
Men's athletics
Representing Czechoslovakia
European Championships
Bronze medal – third place	1974 Rome	High jump
European Indoor Championships
Gold medal – first place	1975 Katowice	High jump
Bronze medal – third place	1974 Gothenburg	High jump
Summer Universiade
Gold medal – first place	1973 Moscow	High jump

Vladimír Malý (born 27 June 1952) is a Czech former high jumper.

== Biography ==
He won gold medal in the high jump at the 1975 European Athletics Indoor Championships with a personal best of 2.24.

== Achievements ==
Year	Competition	Venue	Result	Event	Measure	Notes
1975	European Indoor Championships	(Poland) Katowice	1st	High jump	2.21 m	
