= István Major =

Hungarian high jumper (1949–2014)

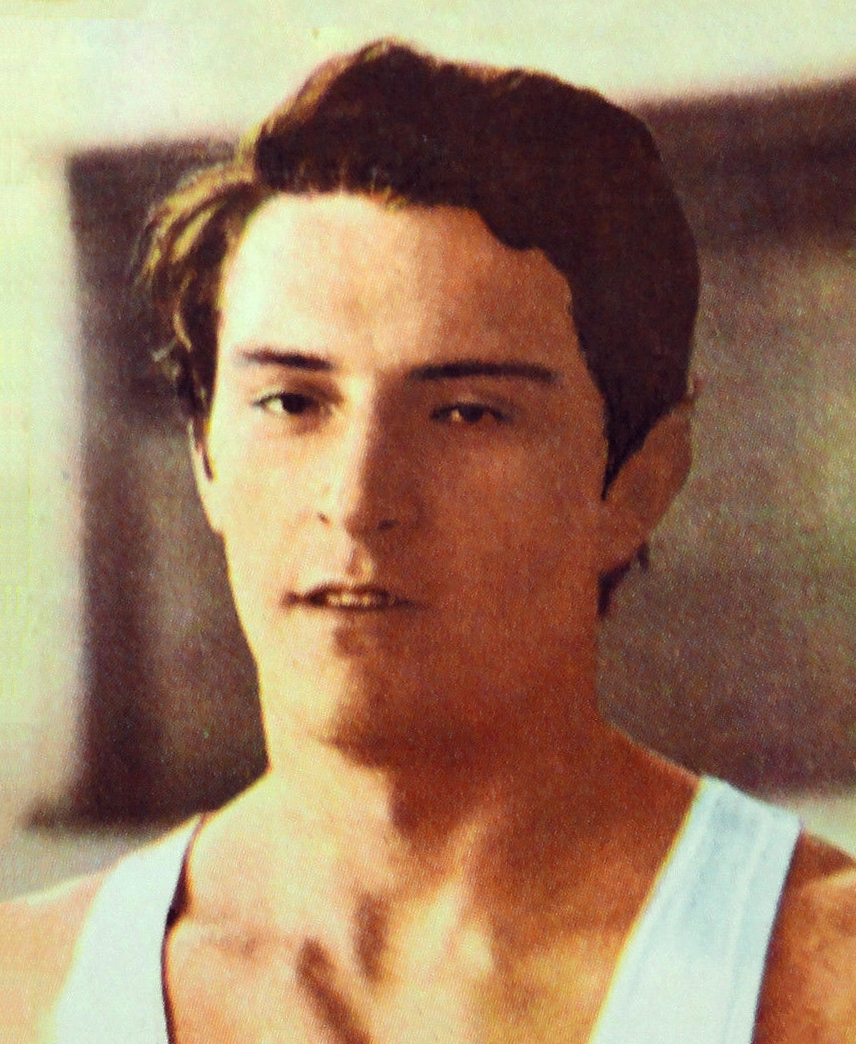

Personal information
- Born: 20 May 1949 Budapest, Hungary
- Died: 5 May 2014 (aged 64) Toronto, Canada
- Height: 186 cm (6 ft 1 in)
- Weight: 80 kg (176 lb)

Sport
- Sport: Athletics
- Event: High jump
- Club: Budapest Honvéd

Achievements and titles
- Personal best: 2.24i (1972)
Medal record
Representing Hungary
European Indoor Championships
Gold medal – first place	1971 Sofia	High jump
Gold medal – first place	1972 Grenoble	High jump
Gold medal – first place	1973 Rotterdam	High jump
Silver medal – second place	1974 Gothenburg	High jump
Summer Universiade
Silver medal – second place	1973 Moscow	High jump
Silver medal – second place	1975 Rome	High jump

István Major (20 May 1949 – 5 May 2014) was a Hungarian high jumper. He won four medals at the European Indoor Championships between 1971 and 1974, as well as two silver medals at the Universiade. His best Olympic performance was a sixth place in 1972.

== Career ==
He was born in Budapest. His first international achievement was the fifth place at the 1969 European Championships. His first victory came at the 1971 European Indoor Championships in Sofia. All three medalists jumped 2.17, but Major won on countback. In the summer that year he finished fourth at the 1971 European Championships.

He then defended the gold medal at the 1972 European Indoor Championships in Grenoble. His winning result of 2.24 metres was a new championships record, and also his career best jump. In the same year he competed at the Olympic Games, tying for sixth place overall. At the 1973 European Indoor Championships he won his third gold medal in a row, this time with 2.20 metres. In the summer he won a silver medal at the Universiade in Moscow. With a jump of 2.18 metres he equalled the winning result of Vladimír Malý, however Major lost on countback. At the 1974 European Indoor Championships he again jumped 2.20 metres, but this time it was only enough for a silver medal behind Soviet's Kęstutis Šapka. At the 1974 European Championships he took his second fourth place in a row, losing the bronze medal to Vladimír Malý on countback.

At the 1975 European Indoor Championships, Major only managed an eighth place, jumping 2.16 metres. In the summer he did win his second silver medal at the Universiade. Like last time, Major tied with the winner. With 2.13 metres, Enzo Del Forno won on countback; on the other hand Major beat bronze medallist Danial Temim who had 2.13 metres as well. However, with results under 2.20 his heyday was over. At the 1976 Summer Olympics, he entered the qualifying round, and passed 2.00 and 2.05 in his first attempts, but did not pass 2.10, thus not reaching the final round. He placed in joint thirteenth place at the 1977 European Indoor Championships, again with 2.16 metres, and thirteenth also at the 1979 European Indoor Championships, with 2.15 metres. Also, in 1977 Major's championships record was beaten by Jacek Wszoła.

Major became Hungarian high jump champion in 1973, 1976, 1977 and 1978, rivalling Endre Kelemen. He also became indoor champion in 1977 and 1978.

== Veterans career ==
In 1983 Major moved to Toronto, Canada, and lived there for the rest of his life. In 1990 he won a gold medal at the European Veterans Championships, recording 2.07 metres in the +40 years class. No other competitor at the European Veterans Championships has come close to this result. In July 2002 Major set a Canadian record for the +55 years class at 1.85 m.
