= Athletics at the 1960 Summer Olympics – Men's high jump =

Men's high jump at the Games of the XVII Olympiad
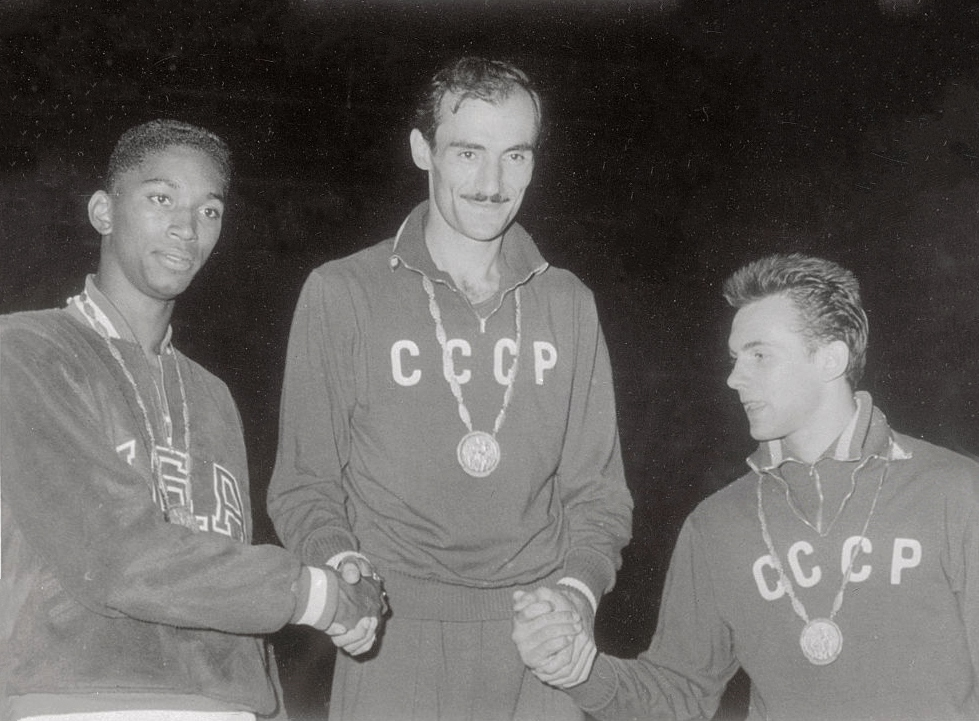
- Thomas, Shavlakadze, and Brumel
- Venue: Olympic Stadium
- Date: September 1, 1960
- Competitors: 32 from 23 nations
- Winning height: 2.16 OR

Medalists
1st place, gold medalist(s)		Robert Shavlakadze; Soviet Union
2nd place, silver medalist(s)		Valery Brumel; Soviet Union
3rd place, bronze medalist(s)		John Thomas; United States

The men's high jump field event at the 1960 Olympic Games took place on September 1. Thirty-two athletes from 23 nations competed. The maximum number of athletes per nation had been set at 3 since the 1930 Olympic Congress. The event was won by Robert Shavlakadze of the Soviet Union, the nation's first victory in the men's high jump. Valery Brumel took silver; both men surpassed the previous best placing for the Soviet team of bronze. American John Thomas took bronze to keep alive the United States' streak of medaling in every edition of the Olympic men's high jump.

== Background ==
This was the 14th appearance of the event, which is one of 12 athletics events to have been held at every Summer Olympics. The returning finalists from the 1956 Games were gold medalist Charles Dumas of the United States, silver medalist Chilla Porter of Australia, fourth-place finisher Stig Pettersson of Sweden, and eleventh-place finisher Maurice Fournier of France. The world record holder, and possibly the odds-on favourite in 1960, was John Thomas of the United States. Valery Brumel of the Soviet Union was considered his biggest challenger; Dumas and the other Soviet athletes (Robert Shavlakadze and Viktor Bolshov) were also outside contenders.

Iraq and Tunisia each made their debut in the event; Germany appeared for the first time as the United Team of Germany. The United States appeared for the 14th time, having competed at each edition of the Olympic men's high jump to that point.

== Competition format ==
The competition used the two-round format introduced in 1912. There were two distinct rounds of jumping with results cleared between rounds. The qualifying round had the bar set at 1.90 metres, 1.95 metres, and 2.00 metres. All jumpers clearing 2.00 metres in the qualifying round advanced to the final. The final had jumps at 1.90 metres, 1.95 metres, 2.00 metres, 2.03 metres, 2.06 metres, 2.09 metres, 2.12 metres, and then increased by 0.02 metres until a winner was found. Each athlete had three attempts at each height.

== Records ==
The world and Olympic records (in metres) prior to the 1960 Summer Olympics:

World record	John Thomas (USA)	2.22	Palo Alto, United States	1 July 1960
Olympic record	Charles Dumas (USA)	2.12	Melbourne, Australia	23 November 1956

Each of the three Soviets matched the Olympic record of 2.12 metres: Valery Brumel, Robert Shavlakadze, and Viktor Bolshov. John Thomas skipped that height; he joined the three Soviets in all successfully breaking the Olympic record at 2.14 metres. Shavlakadze and Brumel were able to extend the new record further, to 2.16 metres, where it stood at the end of the 1960 Games.

== Schedule ==
All times are Central European Time (UTC+1)

Date	Time	Round
Thursday, 1 September 1960	9:00; 15:15	Qualifying; Final

== Results ==
Key

- o = Height cleared
- x = Height failed
- – = Height passed
- r = Retired
- SB = Season's best
- PB = Personal best
- NR = National record
- AR = Area record
- OR = Olympic record
- WR = World record
- WL = World lead
- NM = No mark
- DNS = Did not start
- DQ = Disqualified

All jumpers reaching 2.00 metres advanced to the finals. All heights are listed in metres.

=== Qualifying ===
Rank	Athlete	Nation	1.90	1.95	2.00	Height	Notes
1	John Thomas	United States	—	—	o	2.00	Q
2	Viktor Bolshov	Soviet Union	o	—	o	2.00	Q
2	Stig Pettersson	Sweden	—	o	o	2.00	Q
4	Maurice Fournier	France	o	o	o	2.00	Q
4	Robert Kotei	Ghana	o	o	o	2.00	Q
4	Jiří Lanský	Czechoslovakia	o	o	o	2.00	Q
4	Kjell-Åke Nilsson	Sweden	o	o	o	2.00	Q
4	Sándor Noszály	Hungary	o	o	o	2.00	Q
4	Cornel Porumb	Romania	o	o	o	2.00	Q
4	Robert Shavlakadze	Soviet Union	o	o	o	2.00	Q
11	Theo Püll	United Team of Germany	xo	o	o	2.00	Q
12	Piotr Sobotta	Poland	o	xxo	o	2.00	Q
13	Valery Brumel	Soviet Union	o	—	xo	2.00	Q
13	Gordon Miller	Great Britain	—	o	xo	2.00	Q
15	Charlie Dumas	United States	o	o	xo	2.00	Q
15	Joe Faust	United States	o	o	xo	2.00	Q
17	Mahamat Idriss	France	o	o	xxo	2.00	Q
18	Kuniyoshi Sugioka	Japan	—	o	xxx	1.95	
19	René Maurer	Switzerland	o	o	xxx	1.95	
19	Werner Pfeil	United Team of Germany	o	o	xxx	1.95	
19	Eero Salminen	Finland	o	o	xxx	1.95	
22	Helmut Donner	Austria	xo	o	xxx	1.95	
22	Jón Pétursson	Iceland	xo	o	xxx	1.95	
24	Crawford Fairbrother	Great Britain	o	xo	xxx	1.95	
24	Peter Riebensahm	United Team of Germany	o	xo	xxx	1.95	
26	Đorđe Majtan	Yugoslavia	—	xxo	xxx	1.95	
27	Chilla Porter	Australia	o	xxo	xxx	1.95	
28	Samuel Igun	Nigeria	o	xxx	—	1.90	
29	Gurbachan Singh Randhawa	India	xxo	xxx	—	1.90	
—	Mohamed Abdul Razzak	Iraq	xxx	—		No mark	
—	Sylvain Bitan	Tunisia	xxx	—		No mark	
—	Çetin Şahiner	Turkey	xxx	—		No mark	

=== Final ===
Rank	Athlete	Nation	1.90	1.95	2.00	2.03	2.06	2.09	2.12	2.14	2.16	2.18	Mark	Notes
1st place, gold medalist(s)	Robert Shavlakadze	Soviet Union	—	—	xo	o	o	o	o	o	o	xxx	2.16	OR
2nd place, silver medalist(s)	Valery Brumel	Soviet Union	—	o	—	o	o	xo	xxo	xo	xo	xxx	2.16	OR
3rd place, bronze medalist(s)	John Thomas	United States	—	—	o	—	o	o	—	xo	xxx	—	2.14	
4	Viktor Bolshov	Soviet Union	—	o	—	o	o	o	o	xo	xxx	—	2.14	
5	Stig Pettersson	Sweden	o	—	o	—	xxo	xxo	xxx	—			2.09	
6	Charlie Dumas	United States	—	—	o	o	—	xxx	—				2.03	
7	Jiří Lanský	Czechoslovakia	o	o	o	o	xxx	—					2.03	
7	Kjell-Åke Nilsson	Sweden	o	o	o	o	xxx	—					2.03	
7	Theo Püll	United Team of Germany	o	o	o	o	xxx	—					2.03	
10	Robert Kotei	Ghana	o	—	o	xo	xxx	—					2.03	
11	Cornel Porumb	Romania	o	o	o	xo	xxx	—					2.03	
12	Mahamat Idriss	France	—	xo	xo	xo	xxx	—					2.03	
13	Sándor Noszály	Hungary	o	o	xo	xxo	xxx	—					2.03	
14	Maurice Fournier	France	—	o	o	xxx	—						2.00	
15	Piotr Sobotta	Poland	o	o	o	xxx	—						2.00	
16	Gordon Miller	Great Britain	o	o	xxo	xxx	—						2.00	
17	Joe Faust	United States	o	o	xxx	—							1.95	
