= 1962 European Athletics Championships – Men's high jump =

Men's high jump at the European Athletics Championships

The men's high jump at the 1962 European Athletics Championships was held in Belgrade, then Yugoslavia, at JNA Stadium on 15 and 16 September 1962.

== Medalists ==
| Gold | Valeriy Brumel; Soviet Union |
| Silver | Stig Pettersson; Sweden |
| Bronze | Robert Shavlakadze; Soviet Union |

== Results ==
=== Final ===
16 September

| Rank | Name | Nationality | Result | Notes |
|---|---|---|---|---|
| 1st place, gold medalist(s) | Valeriy Brumel | Soviet Union | 2.21 | CR |
| 2nd place, silver medalist(s) | Stig Pettersson | Sweden | 2.13 | |
| 3rd place, bronze medalist(s) | Robert Shavlakadze | Soviet Union | 2.09 | |
| 4 | Viktor Bolshov | Soviet Union | 2.06 | |
| 5 | Edward Czernik | Poland | 2.06 | |
| 6 | Gerd Dührkop | East Germany | 2.06 | |
| 7 | Werner Pfeil | East Germany | 2.03 | |
| 8 | Đorđe Majtan | Yugoslavia | 2.00 | |
| 9 | Sándor Noszály | Hungary | 2.00 | |
| 10 | Kjell-Åke Nilsson | Sweden | 2.00 | |
| 11 | Gordon Miller | Great Britain | 2.00 | |
| 11 | Henrik Hellen | Finland | 2.00 | |
| 13 | Crawford Fairbrother | Great Britain | 1.95 | |
| 14 | Herbert Hopf | West Germany | 1.95 | |

=== Qualification ===
15 September

| Rank | Name | Nationality | Result | Notes |
|---|---|---|---|---|
| | Stig Pettersson | Sweden | 2.03 | Q |
| | Đorđe Majtan | Yugoslavia | 2.03 | Q |
| | Edward Czernik | Poland | 2.03 | Q |
| | Viktor Bolshov | Soviet Union | 2.03 | Q |
| | Robert Shavlakadze | Soviet Union | 2.03 | Q |
| | Valeriy Brumel | Soviet Union | 2.03 | Q |
| | Gerd Dührkop | East Germany | 2.03 | Q |
| | Gordon Miller | Great Britain | 2.00 | Q |
| | Kjell-Åke Nilsson | Sweden | 2.00 | Q |
| | Henrik Hellen | Finland | 2.00 | Q |
| | Sándor Noszály | Hungary | 2.00 | Q |
| | Werner Pfeil | East Germany | 2.00 | Q |
| | Crawford Fairbrother | Great Britain | 2.00 | Q |
| | Herbert Hopf | West Germany | 2.00 | Q |
| | Eugen Ducu | Romania | 2.00 | |
| | Jón Þordur Ólafsson | Iceland | 2.00 | |
| | Georgi Kumanov | Bulgaria | 1.95 | |
| | Maurice Dugarreau | France | 1.95 | |
| | Piotr Sobotta | Poland | 1.95 | |
| | René Maurer | Switzerland | 1.95 | |

== Participation ==
According to an unofficial count, 20 athletes from 14 countries participated in the event.

- Bulgaria (1)
- East Germany (2)
- Finland (1)
- France (1)
- Hungary (1)
- Iceland (1)
- Poland (2)
- Romania (1)
- Soviet Union (3)
- Sweden (2)
- Switzerland (1)
- Great Britain (2)
- West Germany (1)
- Yugoslavia (1)
