= 1958 European Athletics Championships – Men's high jump =

Men's high jump at the European Athletics Championships

The men's high jump at the 1958 European Athletics Championships was held in Stockholm, Sweden, at Stockholms Olympiastadion on 23 and 24 August 1958.

== Medalists ==
Gold	Rickard Dahl; Sweden
Silver	Jiří Lanský; Czechoslovakia
Bronze	Stig Pettersson; Sweden

== Results ==
=== Qualification ===
23 August

Rank	Name	Nationality	Result	Notes
	Zbigniew Lewandowski	Poland	1.93	Q
	Kazimierz Fabrykowski	Poland	1.93	Q
	Jiří Lanský	Czechoslovakia	1.93	Q
	Werner Pfeil	East Germany	1.93	Q
	Vlado Marjanović	Yugoslavia	1.93	Q
	Eero Salminen	Finland	1.93	Q
	Rickard Dahl	Sweden	1.93	Q
	Igor Kashkarov	Soviet Union	1.93	Q
	Osmo Ahonen	Finland	1.93	Q
	Theo Püll	West Germany	1.93	Q
	Yuriy Stepanov	Soviet Union	1.93	Q
	Petr Elbogen	Czechoslovakia	1.93	Q
	Stig Pettersson	Sweden	1.93	Q
	Eric Amiet	Switzerland	1.93	Q
	Çetin Şahiner	Turkey	1.93	Q
	Crawford Fairbrother	Great Britain	1.93	Q
	Michel Herrmann	France	1.90	
	Gordon Miller	Great Britain	1.85	

=== Final ===
24 August

Rank	Name	Nationality	Result	Notes
1st place, gold medalist(s)	Rickard Dahl	Sweden	2.12	CR NR
2nd place, silver medalist(s)	Jiří Lanský	Czechoslovakia	2.10	NR
3rd place, bronze medalist(s)	Stig Pettersson	Sweden	2.10	
4	Igor Kashkarov	Soviet Union	2.06	
5	Theo Püll	West Germany	2.06	NR
6	Yuriy Stepanov	Soviet Union	2.06	
7	Petr Elbogen	Czechoslovakia	2.02	
8	Eero Salminen	Finland	1.99	
9	Werner Pfeil	East Germany	1.99	
10	Crawford Fairbrother	Great Britain	1.99	
11	Çetin Şahiner	Turkey	1.99	
12	Kazimierz Fabrykowski	Poland	1.99	
13	Zbigniew Lewandowski	Poland	1.96	
14	Osmo Ahonen	Finland	1.96	
15	Eric Amiet	Switzerland	1.93	
16	Vlado Marjanović	Yugoslavia	1.90	

== Participation ==
According to an unofficial count, 18 athletes from 12 countries participated in the event.

- Czechoslovakia (2)
- East Germany (1)
- Finland (2)
- France (1)
- Poland (2)
- Soviet Union (2)
- Sweden (2)
- Switzerland (1)
- Turkey (1)
- Great Britain (2)
- West Germany (1)
- Yugoslavia (1)
