= Athletics at the 1959 Summer Universiade – Men's high jump =

The men's high jump event at the 1959 Summer Universiade was held at the Stadio Comunale di Torino in Turin on 4 and 5 September 1959.

== Medalists ==
Gold	Silver	Bronze
Cornel Porumb; Romania	Vladimir Marjanović; Yugoslavia	Raycho Aleksandrov; Soviet Union; Kazimierz Fabrykowski; Poland

== Results ==
=== Qualification ===
Rank	Heat	Athlete	Nationality	Result	Notes
?	?	Henri Grue	France	1.80	
?	?	Ioannis Koinis	Greece	1.80	
?	?	Maqbool Cheema	Pakistan	1.80	
?	?	Brunello Martini	Italy	1.80	
?	?	Kazimierz Fabrykowski	Poland	1.80	
?	?	Gianpiero Cordovani	Italy	1.80	
?	?	Raycho Aleksandrov	Soviet Union	1.80	
?	?	Harald Lindemann	West Germany	1.80	
?	?	Jean Van Slype	Belgium	1.80	
?	?	Vladimir Marjanović	Yugoslavia	1.80	
?	?	Zdeněk Matějka	Czechoslovakia	1.80	
?	?	Cornel Porumb	Romania	1.80	
?	?	Oladipo Okuwobi	Nigeria	1.80	
?	?	Peter Riebensahm	West Germany	1.80	
?	?	Per Olov Enquist	Sweden	1.80	
?	?	Frank Myhre	Norway	1.80	
?	?	Victor Bolshov	Soviet Union	1.80	
?	?	Lopes	Portugal	1.80	

=== Final ===
Rank	Name	Nationality	Result	Notes
1st place, gold medalist(s)	Cornel Porumb	Romania	2.01	
2nd place, silver medalist(s)	Vladimir Marjanović	Yugoslavia	1.96	
3rd place, bronze medalist(s)	Raycho Aleksandrov	Soviet Union	1.96	
3rd place, bronze medalist(s)	Kazimierz Fabrykowski	Poland	1.96	
5	Per Olov Enquist	Sweden	1.96	
6	Zdeněk Matějka	Czechoslovakia	1.96	
7	Peter Riebensahm	West Germany	1.93	
8	Ioannis Koinis	Greece	1.93	
9	Frank Myhre	Norway	1.93	
10	Gianpiero Cordovani	Italy	1.90	
11	Henri Grue	France	1.90	
12	Jean Van Slype	Belgium	1.85	
12	Oladipo Okuwobi	Nigeria	1.85	
14	Harald Lindemann	West Germany	1.85	
15	Brunello Martini	Italy	1.85	
16	Maqbool Cheema	Pakistan	1.80	
	Victor Bolshov	Soviet Union	NM	
