= Athletics at the 1961 Summer Universiade – Men's high jump =

The men's high jump event at the 1961 Summer Universiade was held at the Vasil Levski National Stadium in Sofia, Bulgaria, with the final on 31 August 1961.

The winning margin was 17 cm which as of 2024 remains the only time the men's high jump was won by more than 11 cm at these games.

== Medalists ==
Gold	Silver	Bronze
Valeriy Brumel; Soviet Union	Igor Kashkarov; Soviet Union	Milan Valenta; Czechoslovakia

== Results ==
=== Qualifications ===
Rank	Name	Nationality	Result	Notes
	Valeriy Brumel	Soviet Union	1.90	q
	Edward Czernik	Poland	1.90	q
	Helmut Donner	Austria	1.90	q
	Herbert Hopf	West Germany	1.90	q
	Igor Kashkarov	Soviet Union	1.90	q
	Sándor Noszály	Hungary	1.90	q
	Peter Riebensahm	West Germany	1.90	q
	Kuniyoshi Sugioka	Japan	1.90	q
	Milan Valenta	Czechoslovakia	1.90	q
	Constantin Dumitrescu	Romania	1.90	q
	Yıldıray Pağda	Turkey	1.90	
	Ricardo Pérez	Cuba	1.90	
	Jean-Luc van Slype	Belgium	1.90	
	Brunello Martini	Italy	1.90	
	Noghadan Rughany	Iran	1.90	
	Yılmaz Vardaroğlu	Turkey	1.90	
	Marin Grigorov	Bulgaria	1.90	

=== Final ===
Rank	Athlete	Nationality	1.85	1.96	1.99	2.01	2.03	2.05	2.08	2.11	2.15	2.20	2.25	2.28	Result	Notes
1st place, gold medalist(s)	Valeriy Brumel	Soviet Union	–	–	–	–	–	o	xo	o	o	o	xxo	xxx	2.25	WL
2nd place, silver medalist(s)	Igor Kashkarov	Soviet Union													2.08	
3rd place, bronze medalist(s)	Milan Valenta	Czechoslovakia													2.03	
4	Edward Czernik	Poland													2.01	
5	Kuniyoshi Sugioka	Japan													1.99	
6	Sándor Noszály	Hungary													1.99	
7	Constantin Dumitrescu	Romania													1.96	
8	Evgeni Yotov	Bulgaria													1.96	
9	Ludwik Nowak	Poland													1.96	
10	Peter Riebensahm	West Germany													1.96	
11	Helmut Donner	Austria													1.96	
12	Herbert Hopf	West Germany													1.85	
