= Richard Dahl =

Swedish high jumper

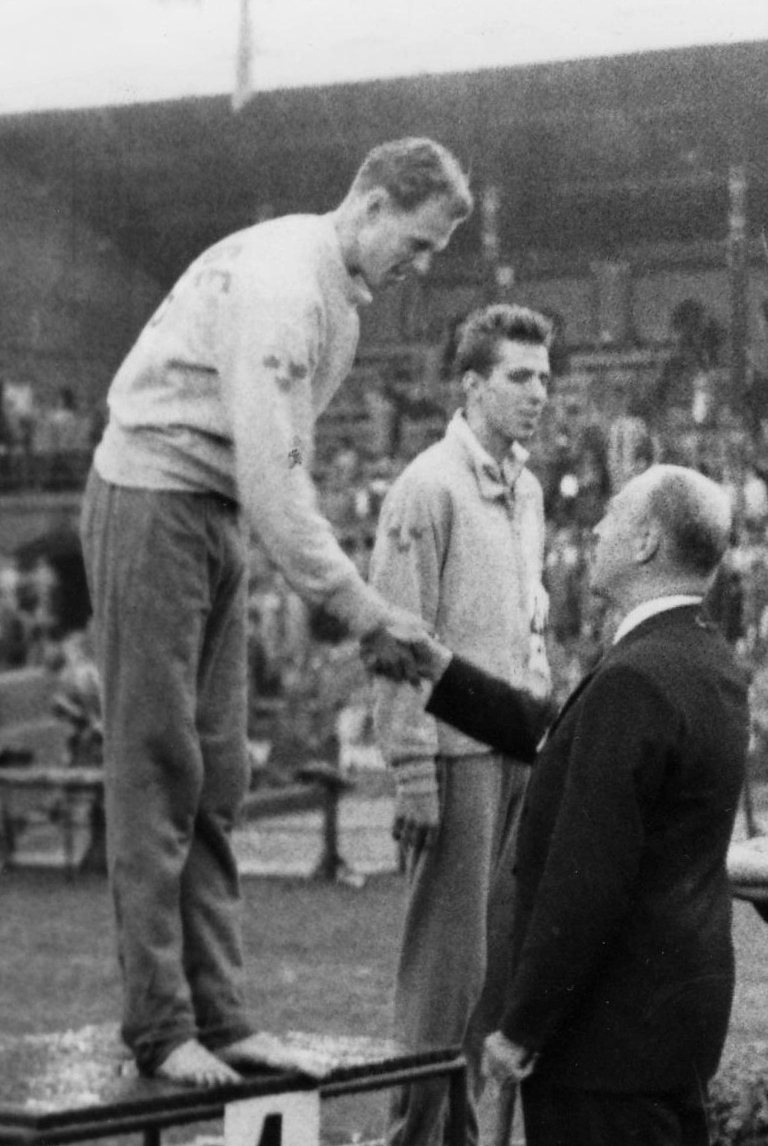
- Richard Dahl (left) and Stig Pettersson at the 1958 European Championships

Personal information
- Born: 5 August 1933 Landskrona, Sweden
- Died: 8 August 2007 (aged 74)

Sport
- Sport: Athletics
- Event: High jump
- Club: IF Kronan; SoIK Hellas; Södertälje IF

Achievements and titles
- Personal best: 2.12 m (1958)
Medal record
Men's athletics
Representing Sweden
European Championships
Gold medal – first place	1958 Stockholm	High jump

Richard Dahl (also known as Rickard Dahl; 5 August 1933 – 8 August 2007) was a Swedish track and field athlete who competed in the high jump. His short-lived career was defined by a surprise win at the 1958 European Athletics Championships in a Swedish record of 2.12 m (6 ft 11 1/4 in).

== Career ==
In 1957 Dahl won his first significant medal, a silver at the national championships behind Stig Pettersson, the leading Swedish jumper of the era. Both repeated that placing the following year.

At the 1958 European Athletics Championships, held in Stockholm, Dahl set a Swedish record and championship record at 2.12 m (6 ft 11 1/4 in), beating Jiří Lanský and Stig Pettersson. He became the fourth, and thus the latest male Swede to win the title, following Kurt Lundqvist, Anton Bolinder and Bengt Nilsson. For this performance he was awarded the Svenska Dagbladet Gold Medal and designated the Stora grabbars märke number 200 in athletics.

Dahl won two more international medals – a bronze at the 1959 International University Games (clearing two metres) and a silver at the inaugural Nordic Athletics Championships (where he lost to Petterssen by ten centimetres). His final achievement of note was a third place at the Swedish Championships in 1960. After retiring from competition, he became a sports journalist for the local paper Länstidningen Södertälje, and later for the regional Nordvästra Skånes Tidningar.
