= 1967 European Indoor Games – Men's high jump =

The men's high jump event at the 1967 European Indoor Games was held on 11 March in Prague.

== Results ==
| Rank | Name | Nationality | 1.90 | 1.95 | 2.00 | 2.05 | 2.08 | 2.11 | 2.14 | 2.17 | Result | Notes |
|---|---|---|---|---|---|---|---|---|---|---|---|---|
| 1st place, gold medalist(s) | Anatoliy Moroz | Soviet Union | – | – | o | o | o | o | xxo | xxx | 2.14 | |
| 2nd place, silver medalist(s) | Henri Elliott | France | o | – | o | o | o | o | xxo | xxx | 2.14 | |
| 3rd place, bronze medalist(s) | Rudolf Baudis | Czechoslovakia | – | o | o | xo | o | o | xxx | | 2.11 | |
| 4 | Rudolf Hübner | Czechoslovakia | – | o | o | o | xo | xo | xxx | | 2.11 | |
| 5 | Gunther Spielvogel | West Germany | – | o | o | o | o | xxx | | | 2.08 | |
| 6 | Edward Czernik | Poland | – | o | xo | o | o | xxx | | | 2.08 | |
| 7 | Viktor Bolshov | Soviet Union | – | – | o | o | xo | xxx | | | 2.08 | |
| 8 | Werner Pfeil | East Germany | – | o | o | o | xo | xxx | | | 2.08 | |
| 9 | Kjell-Åke Nilsson | Sweden | – | xo | o | xxo | xxx | | | | 2.05 | |
| 10 | Giacomo Crosa | Italy | o | o | o | xxx | | | | | 2.00 | |
| 10 | Ljudovit Silađi | Yugoslavia | o | o | o | xxx | | | | | 2.00 | |
