= Athletics at the 1964 Summer Olympics – Men's high jump =

Men's high jump at the Games of the XVIII Olympiad
- Venue: Olympic Stadium
- Dates: 20–21 October 1964
- Competitors: 28 from 19 nations
- Winning height: 2.18 OR

Medalists
1st place, gold medalist(s)		Valeriy Brumel	Soviet Union
2nd place, silver medalist(s)		John Thomas	United States
3rd place, bronze medalist(s)		John Rambo	United States

The men's high jump was one of four men's jumping events on the Athletics at the 1964 Summer Olympics program in Tokyo. Qualification was held on October 20, 1964, with the final on October 21. 29 athletes from 20 nations entered, with 1 not starting in the qualification round. The maximum number of athletes per nation had been set at 3 since the 1930 Olympic Congress. The event was won by Valeriy Brumel of the Soviet Union, the nation's second consecutive victory in the men's high jump. Brumel, who had earned silver in 1960, and American John Thomas, who had previously taken bronze in 1960 and now won silver, became the first two men to win multiple medals in the Olympic high jump. John Rambo, also of the United States, won bronze to complete the podium.

== Background ==
This was the 15th appearance of the event, which is one of 12 athletics events to have been held at every Summer Olympics. The returning finalists from the 1960 Games were gold medalist Robert Shavlakadze and silver medalist Valeriy Brumel of the Soviet Union, bronze medalist John Thomas of the United States, fifth-place finisher Stig Pettersson and seventh-place finisher Kjell-Åke Nilsson of Sweden, twelfth-place finisher Mahamat Idriss of France (now of independent Chad), and sixteenth-place finisher Gordon Miller of Great Britain. While Shavlakadze and Brumel beating Thomas had been a major upset in 1960, Brumel had been the best jumper in the intervening four years—improving the world record six times—and was now the favorite. Brumel and Thomas had faced off nine times since 1960, with Brumel winning eight and Thomas one.

Bulgaria, Chad, the Republic of the Congo, Peru, Spain, and Thailand each made their debut in the event. The United States appeared for the 15th time, having competed at each edition of the Olympic men's high jump to that point.

== Competition format ==
The competition used the two-round format introduced in 1912. There were two distinct rounds of jumping with results cleared between rounds. The qualifying round had the bar set at 1.90 metres, 1.95 metres, 2.00 metres, 2.03 metres, and 2.06 metres. All jumpers clearing 2.06 metres in the qualifying round advanced to the final. The final had jumps at 1.90 metres, 1.95 metres, 2.00 metres, 2.03 metres, 2.06 metres, 2.09 metres, 2.12 metres, and then increased by 0.02 metres until a winner was found. Each athlete had three attempts at each height.

== Records ==
These were the standing world and Olympic records (in metres) prior to the 1964 Summer Olympics.

World record	Valeriy Brumel (URS)	2.28	Moscow, Soviet Union	21 July 1963
Olympic record	Robert Shavlakadze (URS); Valeriy Brumel (URS)	2.16	Rome, Italy	1 September 1960

Valeriy Brumel, John Thomas and John Rambo all equalled the Olympic record with 2.16 metres. Brumel and Thomas then set a new Olympic record with 2.18 metres.

== Schedule ==
All times are Japan Standard Time (UTC+9)

Date	Time	Round
Tuesday, 20 October 1964		Qualifying
Wednesday, 21 October 1964	14:00	Final

== Results ==
Key

- o = Height cleared
- x = Height failed
- – = Height passed
- r = Retired
- SB = Season's best
- PB = Personal best
- NR = National record
- AR = Area record
- OR = Olympic record
- WR = World record
- WL = World lead
- NM = No mark
- DNS = Did not start
- DQ = Disqualified

=== Qualifying ===
Jumpers had to pass 2.06 metres to qualify for the final. The bar started at 1.90 metres, increasing gradually to 2.06 metres. Each jumper had three attempts at each height or could skip any lower height (but could not return to a lower height if he determined that he could not succeed).

Rank	Athlete	Nation	1.90	1.95	2.00	2.03	2.06	Height	Notes
1	Henri Elendé	Republic of the Congo	o	—	o	—	o	2.06	Q
1	Robert Shavlakadze	Soviet Union	—	—	o	o	o	2.06	Q
3	Edward Czernik	Poland	—	o	o	o	o	2.06	Q
3	Mahamat Idriss	Chad	—	o	o	o	o	2.06	Q
3	Valeriy Skvortsov	Soviet Union	—	o	o	o	o	2.06	Q
6	John Thomas	United States	—	—	xo	o	o	2.06	Q
7	Mauro Bogliatto	Italy	—	o	o	xo	o	2.06	Q
8	Ed Caruthers	United States	o	xo	o	o	o	2.06	Q
8	Lawrie Peckham	Australia	o	o	o	xo	o	2.06	Q
8	John Rambo	United States	o	o	o	xo	o	2.06	Q
11	Valeriy Brumel	Soviet Union	—	—	o	xxo	o	2.06	Q
12	Evgeni Yordanov	Bulgaria	o	xo	xo	o	o	2.06	Q
13	Stig Pettersson	Sweden	—	o	o	o	xo	2.06	Q
14	Kjell-Åke Nilsson	Sweden	—	o	xo	o	xo	2.06	Q
14	Anthony Sneazwell	Australia	—	xo	o	o	xo	2.06	Q
16	Wolfgang Schillkowski	United Team of Germany	o	o	o	xo	xo	2.06	Q
17	Samuel Igun	Nigeria	o	o	xo	xo	xo	2.06	Q
18	Rudi Köppen	United Team of Germany	—	xo	o	xxo	xo	2.06	Q
19	Ralf Drecoll	United Team of Germany	o	o	o	o	xxo	2.06	Q
20	Gordon Miller	Great Britain	o	o	xxo	xo	xxo	2.06	Q
21	Luis María Garriga	Spain	o	o	o	xxo	xxx	2.03	
22	Henrik Hellén	Finland	o	o	o	xxx	—N/a	2.00	
22	Robert Sainte-Rose	France	o	o	o	xxx	—N/a	2.00	
24	Kuniyoshi Sugioka	Japan	o	xo	o	xxx	—N/a	2.00	
25	Jón Ólafsson	Iceland	o	o	xo	xxx	—N/a	2.00	
26	Roberto Abugattás	Peru	o	xo	xxx	—N/a		1.95	
27	Kinya Miyazaki	Japan	o	—	xxx	—N/a		1.90	
—	Kateseperswasdi Bhakdikul	Thailand	xxx	—N/a				No mark	
—	Cha Won Sil	North Korea	DNS						

=== Final ===
Each jumper again had three attempts at each height, with the bar starting at 1.90 metres. Three jumpers were unable to perform as well as they had in the qualification.

Rank	Athlete	Nation	1.90	1.95	2.00	2.03	2.06	2.09	2.12	2.14	2.16	2.18	2.20	Height	Notes
1st place, gold medalist(s)	Valeriy Brumel	Soviet Union	—	—	o	o	o	o	o	xxo	o	o	xxx	2.18	OR
2nd place, silver medalist(s)	John Thomas	United States	—	—	o	o	o	o	xo	xxo	xo	o	xxx	2.18	OR
3rd place, bronze medalist(s)	John Rambo	United States	—	—	o	o	o	o	xo	o	xxo	xxx	—N/a	2.16	
4	Stig Pettersson	Sweden	—	—	o	—	o	o	xo	xo	xxx	—N/a		2.14	
5	Robert Shavlakadze	Soviet Union	—	—	—	o	o	o	o	xxo	xxx	—N/a		2.14	
6	Ralf Drecoll	United Team of Germany	—	o	o	o	o	o	xxx	—N/a				2.09	
6	Kjell-Åke Nilsson	Sweden	—	o	o	o	o	o	xxx	—N/a				2.09	
8	Ed Caruthers	United States	—	o	o	o	xo	o	xxx	—N/a				2.09	
9	Mahamat Idriss	Chad	—	o	o	o	o	xo	xxx	—N/a				2.09	
10	Lawrie Peckham	Australia	o	o	o	o	o	xo	xxx	—N/a				2.09	
11	Edward Czernik	Poland	—	—	o	—	o	xxx	—N/a					2.06	
12	Evgeni Yordanov	Bulgaria	—	o	o	o	o	xxx	—N/a					2.06	
13	Anthony Sneazwell	Australia	—	xo	o	xxo	o	xxx	—N/a					2.06	
14	Valeriy Skvortsov	Soviet Union	—	o	o	o	xo	xxx	—N/a					2.06	
15	Samuel Igun	Nigeria	o	o	o	o	xo	xxx	—N/a					2.06	
16	Mauro Bogliatto	Italy	—	xo	o	o	xo	xxx	—N/a					2.06	
17	Wolfgang Schillkowski	United Team of Germany	o	o	o	o	xxo	xxx	—N/a					2.06	
18	Gordon Miller	Great Britain	o	o	o	o	xxx	—N/a						2.03	
19	Rudi Köppen	United Team of Germany	o	o	o	xxx	—N/a							2.00	
20	Henri Elendé	Republic of the Congo	o	xxx	—N/a									1.90	
