= Yuri Stepanov =

Yuri or Yuriy Stepanov may refer to:

- Yuri Stepanov (actor) (1967–2010), Russian actor
- Yuri Stepanov, actor in the 1997 film The Jackal
- Yuri Stepanov (athlete) (1932–1963), Russian high jumper
- Yuri Stepanov (serial killer), Russian serial killer
