= Joe Faust =

Joe Faust may refer to:

- Joe Faust (athlete), American high jump athlete
- Joe Faust (politician), member of the Alabama House of Representatives
- Joe Clifford Faust, American author
