= Athletics at the 1957 World University Games – Men's high jump =

The men's high jump event at the 1957 World University Games was held at the Stadium Charlety in Paris on 5 September 1957.

== Medalists ==
| Gold | Silver | Bronze |
|---|---|---|
| Yuriy Stepanov; Soviet Union | Igor Kashkarov; Soviet Union | Ernie Shelton; United States |

== Results ==
=== Qualification ===
| Rank | Group | Name | Nationality | Result | Notes |
|---|---|---|---|---|---|
| ? | ? | Juan Ignacio Ariño | Spain | 1.80 | |

=== Final ===
| Rank | Name | Nationality | Result | Notes |
|---|---|---|---|---|
| 1st place, gold medalist(s) | Yuriy Stepanov | Soviet Union | 2.12 | |
| 2nd place, silver medalist(s) | Igor Kashkarov | Soviet Union | 2.01 | |
| 3rd place, bronze medalist(s) | Ernie Shelton | United States | 1.98 | |
| 4 | Vladimír Savčinský | Czechoslovakia | 1.98 | |
| 5 | Arpád Bodó | Hungary | 1.90 | |
| 6 | Gianmario Roveraro | Italy | 1.90 | |
| 7 | Kazimierz Fabrykowski | Poland | 1.90 | |
| 8 | Janusz Skupny | Poland | 1.85 | |
| 9 | Todor Belchev | Bulgaria | 1.85 | |
| 10 | Jean-Claude Bernard | France | 1.85 | |
| 11 | Reinaldo de Oliveira | Brazil | 1.75 | |
