= Jaroslav Kovář =

Medal record

Men's athletics

Representing Czechoslovakia

European Championships
Bronze medal – third place	1954 Bern	High jump

Jaroslav Kovář (12 May 1934 – 14 February 2015) was a Czech track and field athlete who competed in the high jump for Czechoslovakia. He was the bronze medallist at the 1954 European Athletics Championships, behind his teammate Jiří Lanský. He set a lifetime best of 2.06 m (6 ft 9 in) in his native Prague in 1957. He was highly successful in student competitions, taking gold at the 1954 World Student Games and a gold and a silver at the World Festival of Youth and Students.

He was a three-time national champion, winning the Czechoslovak title three years straight from 1955 to 1957. He used the eastern cut-off technique pioneered by Michael Sweeney before moving on to the straddle technique. He graduated from Prague's Faculty of Physical Education and Sport and later became an athletics coach. Amongst his charges were national record breakers Jaroslav Alexa, Rudolf Baudis, Josef Hrabal, Jindřich Vondra and Ján Zvara. He was also coach to women's high jumpers Jaroslava Valentová, Alena Prosková and Věra Bradáčová. Later in his career he trained Zuzana Hlavoňová, Tomáš Janků, Svatoslav Ton, Iva Straková and Oldřiška Marešová.

== International competitions ==
Year	Competition	Venue	Position	Event	Notes
1953	World Festival of Youth and Students	Bucharest, Romania	2nd	High jump	1.93 m
1954	World Student Games	Budapest, Hungary	1st	High jump	1.99 m
1954	European Championships	Bern, Switzerland	3rd	High jump	1.96 m
1955	World Festival of Youth and Students	Warsaw, Poland	1st	High jump	1.99 m

== National titles ==
- Czechoslovak Athletics Championships
  - High jump: 1955, 1956, 1957

== See also ==
- List of European Athletics Championships medalists (men)
