= Viktor Bolshov =

Soviet high jumper

Personal information
- Born: 23 May 1939 (age 87) Izerbash, Dagestan ASSR, Russian SFSR, Soviet Union
- Height: 184 cm (6 ft 0 in)
- Weight: 78 kg (172 lb)

Sport
- Sport: Athletics
- Event: High jump

Achievements and titles
- Personal best: 2.21 m (1972)

Viktor Bolshov (Russian: Виктор Большов; born 23 May 1939) is a retired Soviet high jumper. He competed in the 1960 Olympics finishing fourth behind his teammates Robert Shavlakadze, world record holder Valery Brumel and American John Thomas. During the course of the competition all four equaled the Olympic record, Shavlakadze, the first jumper in the order set the record first. Based on current rules, Bolshov would have tied Thomas for the bronze medal, but at the time jumpers were penalized for the number of attempts and Bolshov took seven attempts during the competition to Thomas' five.

In 1961, Bolshov jumped 2.16 m in Grozny, at the time he was the number three high jumper in the world.

Bolshov continued jumping, returning to the Olympics in 1968, but not making the final. In 1974, he equalled his 2.16 at the Soviet National Championships in Moscow, at age 35 setting the Masters M35 World Record. The record would stand for 17 years.

Bolshov is married to Valentina Maslovskaya, a Soviet sprinter who also competed at the 1960 Olympics; their daughter Olga Bolşova became an Olympic high jumper.

According to Valery Brumel's wife, Vladimir Vysotsky originally devoted his "Song about high jumper" (Russian: Песенка про прыгуна в высоту) to Bolshov. Later, when Brumel heard the song, he "decided" that it is about him, which Vysotsky did not mind.
