= Sándor Noszály =

Sándor Noszály can refer to:

- Sándor Noszály (high jumper), Hungarian high jumper
- Sándor Noszály (tennis), Hungarian tennis player
