= Kin'ya =

- Gender: Male

Origin
- Origin: Japanese
- Meaning: Different meanings depending on the kanji used

Kin'ya or Kinya (written: 欣也, 欣哉, 欽也 or キンヤ in katakana) is a masculine Japanese given name. Notable people with the name include:

- Kinya Abe (安部 欣哉; born 1969), Japanese fencer
- Kinya Aikawa (愛川 欽也; born 1934), Japanese actor and voice actor
- Kin'ya Kitaōji (北大路 欣也; born 1943), Japanese actor
- Kinya Kotani (コタニ キンヤ; born 1979), Japanese singer and actor
- Kinya Miyazaki (宮崎 欣也; born 1938), Japanese high jumper
- Kinya Takehara (竹原 欣也; born 1974), Japanese footballer
