= Jón Pétursson (athlete) =

Icelandic high jumper

Personal information
- Nationality: Icelandic
- Born: 19 July 1936 (age 89) Grundarfjörður, Iceland

Sport
- Sport: Athletics
- Event: High jump

Jón Pétursson (19 July 1936) is an Icelandic athlete. He competed in the men's high jump at the 1960 Summer Olympics. He published an autobiography in 2010 titled "Jón lögga".
