= Stig Pettersson =

Swedish high jumper

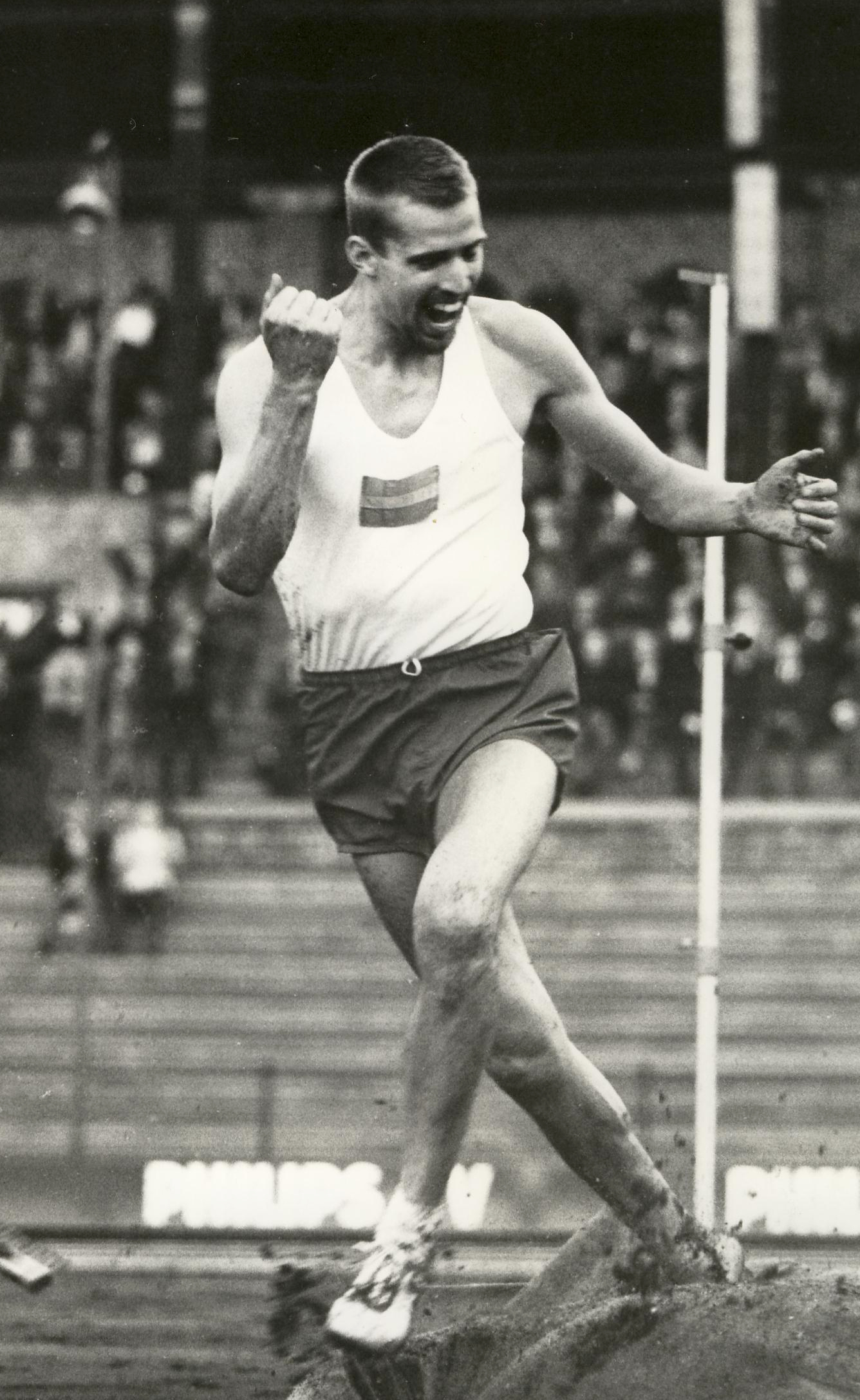

Personal information
- Born: 26 March 1935 (age 91) Stockholm, Sweden
- Height: 1.90 m (6 ft 3 in)
- Weight: 74 kg (163 lb)

Sport
- Sport: Athletics
- Event: High jump
- Club: Kronobergs IK, Stockholm

Achievements and titles
- Personal best: 2.16 m (1962)
Medal record
Men's athletics
Representing Sweden
European Championships
Silver medal – second place	1962 Belgrade	High jump
Bronze medal – third place	1958 Stockholm	High jump

Stig Roland Helmer "Stickan" Pettersson (born 26 March 1935) is a retired Swedish high jumper. He won two medals at the European Athletics Championships and competed in three Olympic Games.

Pettersson placed just outside the medals in three Olympic Games. In 1956 he jumped 2.06 m finishing fourth; he was briefly in a tie for the Olympic record, but it was broken during the competition. Four years later in Rome he cleared 2.09 m for the fifth place, and in Tokyo in 1964 he placed fourth again, despite his best Olympic jump of 2.14 m.

At the 1958 European Championships, held in his home city of Stockholm, Pettersson won the bronze medal with a jump of 2.10 m. At the 1962 Championships in Belgrade he cleared 2.13 m, enough for a silver medal behind the future Olympic Champion Valeriy Brumel.

Pettersson was the national champion in 1956–62 and 1964 and held the Swedish high jump record from 1960 to 1968; his personal best of 2.16 m was among the world's best jumps in 1962. Track & Field News ranked him in the world's top 10 from 1956 to 1964.

In the 1970s Pettersson was director of the Swedish Athletics Association. He headed the national athletics team at the 1980 Olympics and carried the Swedish Olympic flag at the opening ceremony.

Olympic Games
Preceded by Jan Karlsson	Flagbearer for Sweden; Moscow 1980	Succeeded by Hans Svensson
