= Wolfgang Schillkowski =

German high jumper

Personal information
- Nationality: German
- Born: 3 July 1942 (age 84) Danzig, Germany

Sport
- Sport: Athletics
- Event: High jump

Wolfgang Schillkowski (born 3 July 1942) is a German athlete. He competed in the men's high jump at the 1964 Summer Olympics.
