= Crawford Fairbrother =

Scottish high jumper (1936–1986)

Personal information
- Nationality: British (Scottish)
- Born: 1 December 1936 Paisley, Renfrewshire, Scotland
- Died: 23 November 1986 (aged 49) Paisley, Renfrewshire, Scotland
- Education: John Neilson Institution
- Occupation: Meteorologist
- Years active: 1958 –1970
- Height: 1.87 m (6 ft 2 in)
- Weight: 76 kg (168 lb)

Sport
- Sport: Athletics
- Event: High jump
- Club: Victoria Park AAC, Glasgow

Achievements and titles
- Personal best: 6 ft 9 in (2.06 m)

Crawford William Fairbrother MBE (1 December 1936 – 23 November 1986) was a Scottish high jumper who competed at the 1960 Summer Olympics.

== Biography ==
Fairbrother was born in Paisley, Renfrewshire, Scotland, and his father was Scottish Athletics Championship medallist in high jump in the 1920s and 1930s.

Fairbrother won a record 13 successive Scottish titles in the high jump from 1957 to 1969, the best post-war championship record by any Scot. He also won the British AAA Championship titles in 1959 AAA Championships, 1961 AAA Championships and 1964 AAA Championships.

Fairbrother first competed internationally at the 1958 British Empire and Commonwealth Games in Cardiff, Wales. Representing Scotland, he finished in seventh place in the final of the high jump with a jump of 6 ft 6 in (1.98 m). One month later at the 1958 European Athletics Championships in Stockholm, Sweden, Fairbrother, representing Great Britain in the high jump, finished tenth in the final clearing 6 ft 6 1/2 in (1.99 m). At the 1960 Summer Olympics in Rome, Fairbrother failed to make the qualifying height of 2 m (6 ft 7 in) in the high jump. Two years later at the 1962 European Athletics Championships in Belgrade, Yugoslavia, Fairbrother in the high jump cleared 6 ft 6 3/4 in (2.00 m). Two months later at the 1962 British Empire and Commonwealth Games in Perth, Western Australia, Fairbrother finished eighth in the high jump clearing the bar at 6 ft 6 in (1.98 m). At the 1966 British Empire and Commonwealth Games in Kingston, Jamaica, Fairbrother recorded his best international result finishing fourth in the high jump clearing the bar at 6 ft 6 in (1.98 m). At his final international meet, the 1970 British Commonwealth Games in Edinburgh, Fairbrother took the oath of behalf of the competitors at the opening ceremony. The following day in the high jump, Fairbrother failed to make the final.

He represented Britain on a record 53 occasions and placed in the top three 35 times. He cleared the height of 6 ft 6 in (1.98 m) on more than 200 occasions. He set three United Kingdom and five Scottish records, the best being 6 ft 9 in (2.06 m) set in September 1964, a mark which stood until 1975.

Fairbrother died on 23 November 1986 in his hometown Paisley, eight days short of his 50th birthday. He survived by his wife Rena, daughter Karen and son Kenneth. A service was held on 26 November 1986 at St. John's Church, Paisley and he was cremated during a private service.
