= 1954 European Athletics Championships – Men's high jump =

Men's high jump at the European Athletics Championships

The men's high jump at the 1954 European Athletics Championships was held in Bern, Switzerland, at Stadion Neufeld on 27 and 29 August 1954.

== Medalists ==
Gold	Bengt Nilsson; Sweden
Silver	Jiří Lanský; Czechoslovakia
Bronze	Jaroslav Kovář; Czechoslovakia

== Results ==
=== Final ===
29 August

Rank	Name	Nationality	Result	Notes
1st place, gold medalist(s)	Bengt Nilsson	Sweden	2.02	CR
2nd place, silver medalist(s)	Jiří Lanský	Czechoslovakia	1.98	
3rd place, bronze medalist(s)	Jaroslav Kovář	Czechoslovakia	1.96	
4	Bertil Holmgren	Sweden	1.96	
5	Yuriy Stepanov	Soviet Union	1.93	
6	Todor Belchev	Bulgaria	1.93	
7	Werner Bahr	West Germany	1.93	
8	Zbigniew Lewandowski	Poland	1.90	
9	Hans-Jürgen Jenss	West Germany	1.90	
10	Vlado Marjanović	Yugoslavia	1.90	
11	Hans Wahli	Switzerland	1.90	
12	Kazimierz Fabrykowski	Poland	1.85	

=== Qualification ===
27 August

Rank	Name	Nationality	Result	Notes
	Jaroslav Kovář	Czechoslovakia	1.90	Q
	Hans Wahli	Switzerland	1.90	Q
	Bengt Nilsson	Sweden	1.90	Q
	Todor Belchev	Bulgaria	1.90	Q
	Bertil Holmgren	Sweden	1.90	Q
	Zbigniew Lewandowski	Poland	1.90	Q
	Hans-Jürgen Jenss	West Germany	1.90	Q
	Werner Bahr	West Germany	1.90	Q
	Kazimierz Fabrykowski	Poland	1.90	Q
	Yuriy Stepanov	Soviet Union	1.90	Q
	Jiří Lanský	Czechoslovakia	1.90	Q
	Vlado Marjanović	Yugoslavia	1.90	Q
	Volodymyr Sitkin	Soviet Union	1.85	
	Erdal Akkan	Turkey	1.85	
	Brendan O'Reilly	Ireland	1.85	
	Etienne Roques	France	1.85	
	Wolfgang Weiss	Switzerland	1.80	
	Walter Herssens	Belgium	1.80	

== Participation ==
According to an unofficial count, 18 athletes from 12 countries participated in the event.

- Belgium (1)
- Bulgaria (1)
- Czechoslovakia (2)
- France (1)
- Ireland (1)
- Poland (2)
- Soviet Union (2)
- Sweden (2)
- Switzerland (2)
- Turkey (1)
- West Germany (2)
- Yugoslavia (1)
