= Ralf Drecoll =

German high jumper (1944–2012)

Ralf Drecoll (29 September 1944 – 23 September 2012) was a West German track and field athlete who competed for the United Team of Germany in the 1964 Summer Olympics.

He was born in Buxtehude. In 1964 he finished sixth in the high jump event.
