= Joe Faust (athlete) =

American track and field athlete

Joseph Patrick Faust (born September 21, 1942 in Los Angeles, California, United States) is an American track and field athlete known for the high jump. He extended his personal jumping flight interests into mathematics and aviation.

== Track & Field Athletics: Running High Jumper ==
He represented the United States in the 1960 Summer Olympics, Mens's high jump, 17th place. He graduated in June 1959 from Culver City High School, at age 16; then he attended UCLA for a month; in the following semester he attended Occidental College and was there coached by Charles "Chuck" Coker (founder of Universal Gym Equipment); then at age 17 year 284 days, he became the youngest American to qualify for the 1960 Olympic high jump, just one day younger than Reynaldo Brown who qualified for the 1968 Olympics also from a Southern California high school. In the Olympics, he qualified for the final by jumping 2 meters. In the final, he cleared opening height 1.90 m; at the next height he missed three times and thus was first out for 17th place in the finals. Faust was inducted in the Occidental College Hall of Fame.

Faust had cleared 7 feet (2.134m) for the first time in the Olympic Trials, which was the World Junior Record; his record only lasted about a month before it was surpassed by silver medalist Valery Brumel; Dumas was third in the Olympic Trials; Faust was second; Thomas was first while then breaking the world record. In the interim between the trials and the Olympics, Faust had injured a couple of discs in his back and jumped in pain to prove his fitness to retain his spot in the Olympics. Faust jumped for the Southern California Striders. Class valedictorian in high school, he received the Clarence Addison Dykstra Award scholarship to UCLA, but quit after a month, instead ending up across town at Occidental College with a full academic scholarship. Faust would improve his best to over 7'2.5" a couple of years later and continued to jump into the Masters division. Bill Peck and others observed Faust's unofficial jump of 7' 4.75" in a third competition within a 24 hr period on the field of the Mt. San Antonio Relays; he jumped in the first two events officially; the third was an unofficial jumping session; the bar was wood and square cross-sectioned; the bar stayed up for about 8 seconds; at the moment the official world record by Brumel was less; Bill Peck (Joe's fellow track teammate at Occidental College; Bill was also a contestant at the Olympic Trials in 1960 at Stanford University) had been at the same Olympic Trials in 1960 when Faust broke the world junior record; Bill was one of the many witnesses in 1962 of Joe's life-best high jump; in background public address system, one could hear the Relays' officials crowning his future wife as Mt. SAC Relays Queen; she was on the same track team as Joe. Faust graduated that year from Mt. San Antonio College; he was coached by Hilmer Lodge; the stadium of Faust's best-ever jump was named after Mr. Lodge: Hilmer Lodge Stadium Faust broke Charles Dumas' national junior college record with a clearance of 7' 1 1/4".

Faust's jumping ability was discovered while jumping in junior high school in 1953 by William O'Rourke; Faust was coached by O'Rourke in all six years, seventh through 12th grade. At that time he set out with a goal of making the Olympics. Faust was noted in the Helms Athletic Foundation's Helm's Hall of Fame in Culver City for his age 15 leap of 6' 8 1/4" in an open Southern Pacific A.A.U. meet while he was a junior in high school; the jump was at a college he would later attend: Occidental College. En route, he finished second at the 1959 CIF California State Meet and fourth the year before.

Faust is the son of western actor Louis Robert "Bob" Faust, who separated from his family leaving Joe to grow up with a variety of homes each year; one home with his struggling mother in poverty with his six siblings, but also in a foster home in Culver City, California; his dad and mother together gathered their six children some years later; a seventh child was born from the same parents. Joe's foster home (Culver City with Milton Clifford Davis—former superintendent of Douglas Aircraft Company in Santa Monica, California, and wife) and family home were both open to him during his high jumping high school years. His natural father came on the field when Joe just cleared his first 7 ft jump at the Olympic Trials at Stanford University in 1960. The author David Maraniss of the book Rome 1960 publicly acknowledged that some Faust family history errors published are to be corrected in further editions.

== Mathematics ==
Joe Faust graduated in 1988 from California State University, Los Angeles with a B.A. in pure mathematics. For four years he instructed mathematics at CSULA. He taught mathematics in the Los Angeles Unified School District in a middle school. He was published in 2002 for authoring a specific integer sequence A066526.

== Aviation ==
Joe Faust founded Kite Information and Technology Exchange Society of America (K.I.T.E.S.A.), Self-Soar Association (S-SA), United States Hang Glider Association (co-founder with Bob Luthardt), EnergyKiteSystems, co-founded Airborne Wind Energy Industry Association (AWEIA). He was publisher of Low & Slow magazine, Hang Glider Weekly, Hang Glider Business Weekly, Hang Glider Magazine, and Lift e-zine. Faust's foster father, Milton Clifford Davis, who introduced him to higher mathematics and aircraft manufacturing, was in management at the Douglas Aircraft Company; Faust twice worked at the company's Santa Monica, California plant- briefly in 1963, and then after the company became McDonnell Douglas. Joe was lead actor and hang glider pilot for a Dial Soap TV commercial. Mike Wallace interviewed Faust as hang glider pilot for a 60 Minutes segment titled, 'Ever Since Icarus', initially aired on August 31, 1975. A photo of Faust hang gliding was on the first edition back cover of the book Hang Gliding by Dan Poynter. He co-founded Friends of Dockweiler Gliding Society on May 23, 2015. He founded United States Hang Gliding Rating System (USHGRS) to cover recreational hang gliding pilots who have used US airspace.

== See also ==
- Hang Gliding
- Joe Faust
