= Gordon Miller (athlete) =

British high jumper (born 1939)

Personal information
- Nationality: British (English)
- Born: 16 December 1939 (age 86) Croydon, England
- Height: 1.91 m (6 ft 3 in)
- Weight: 85 kg (187 lb)

Sport
- Sport: Athletics
- Event: High jump
- Club: Hermes Club; South London Harriers

Gordon Albert Miller (born 16 December 1939) is a former British high jumper who competed at the two Olympic Games.

== Biography ==
Miller first competed internationally at the 1958 British Empire and Commonwealth Games in Cardiff, Wales. Representing the England athletics team, he finished in tenth place in the final of the high jump with a jump of 6 ft 5 in (1.96 m). One month later at the 1958 European Athletics Championships in Stockholm, Sweden, Miller, representing Great Britain in the high jump, only managed to clear 6 ft 3/4 in (1.85 m) and was not enough to make the final.

At the 1960 Summer Olympics in Rome, Miller qualified in equal 13th place for the final of the high jump with a jump of 2.00 m (6 ft 7 in). In final, Miller didn't improve on his qualifying height and finished in 16th position. Two years later at the 1962 European Athletics Championships in Belgrade, Yugoslavia, Miller finished in 11th place in the high jump final with jump of 6 ft 7 3/4 in (2.03 m). Two months later at the 1962 British Empire and Commonwealth Games in Perth, Western Australia, Miller recorded his best international result finishing fourth in the high jump clearing the bar at 6 ft 8 in (2.03 m).

At his final international meet, the 1964 Summer Olympics in Tokyo, Miller in the high jump cleared the qualifying height of 2.06 m (6 ft 9 in), however in the final the best he could manage was 2.03 m (6 ft 8 in). This placed him in 18th position.

Miller finished on the podium of the AAA Championships on five occasions from 1959 to 1967 and because he was the highest placed British athlete at the 1958 AAA Championships, 1960 AAA Championships, 1966 AAA Championships and 1967 AAA Championships editions, he was considered the British high jump champion.
