= Sylvain Bitan =

Tunisian high jumper

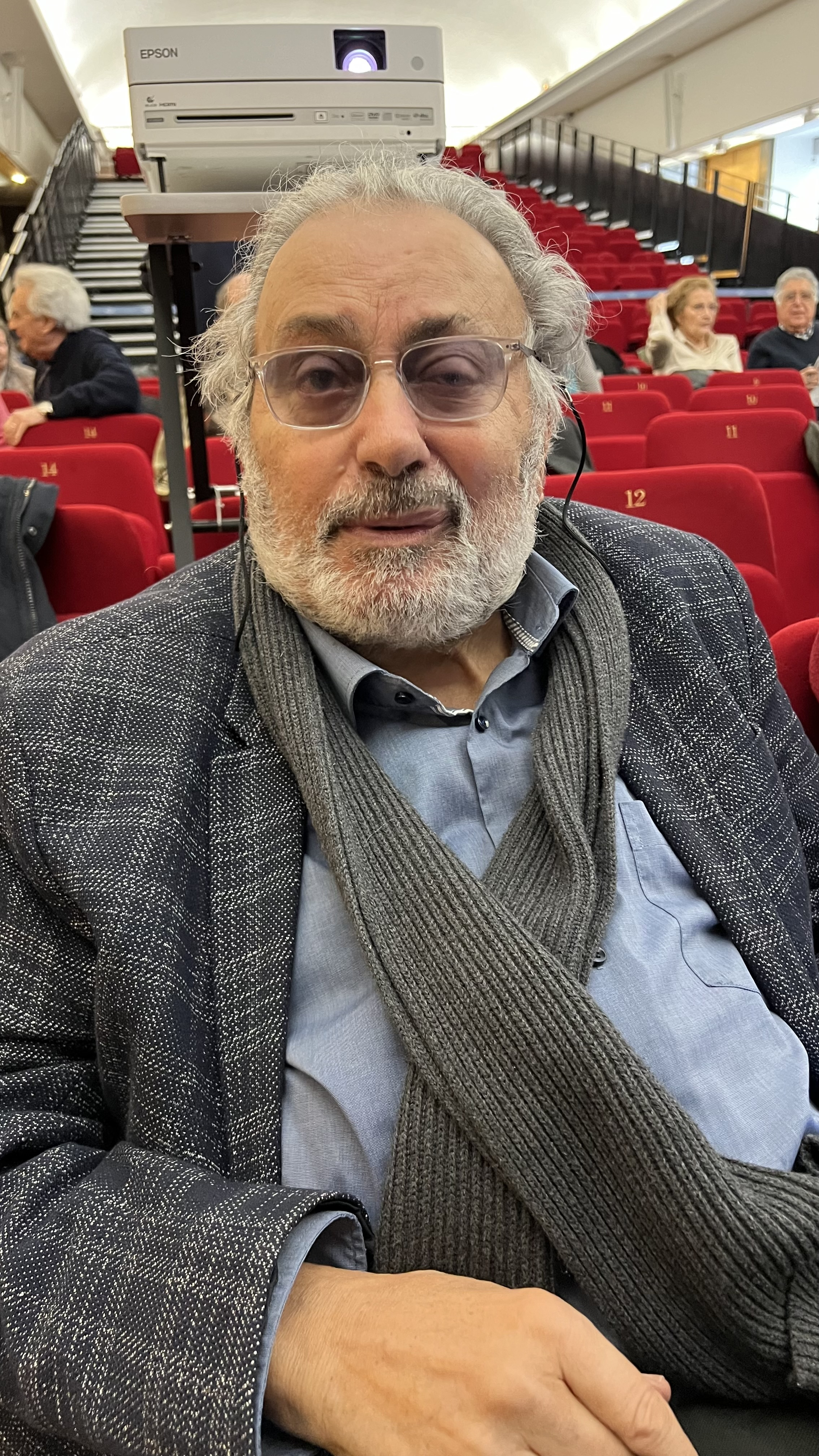
- Sylvain Bitan in 2024

Personal information
- Nationality: Tunisian
- Born: 16 October 1941 (age 84)

Sport
- Sport: Athletics
- Event: High jump

Sylvain Bitan (born 16 October 1941) is a Tunisian athlete. He competed in the men's high jump at the 1960 Summer Olympics.
