= Piotr Sobotta =

Polish high jumper

Personal information
- Full name: Piotr Jürgen Sobotta
- Nationality: Polish
- Born: 12 November 1940 (age 85) Gleiwitz, Germany (modern-day Poland)
- Height: 1.82 m (6 ft 0 in)
- Weight: 80 kg (176 lb)

Sport
- Sport: Athletics
- Event: High jump
- Club: AZS Gliwice

Piotr Jürgen Sobotta (born 12 November 1940) is a Polish athlete. He competed in the men's high jump at the 1960 Summer Olympics.

His personal best in the event is 2.09 metres set in Kraków in 1962. This was the national record at the time.

His wife Barbara Sobotta (née Lerczak) was a sprinter.

== International competitions ==
Year	Competition	Venue	Position	Notes
Representing Poland
1960	Olympic Games	Rome, Italy	15th	2.00 m
1962	European Championships	Belgrade, Yugoslavia	17th (q)	1.95 m
