= John Thomas (athlete) =

American high jumper

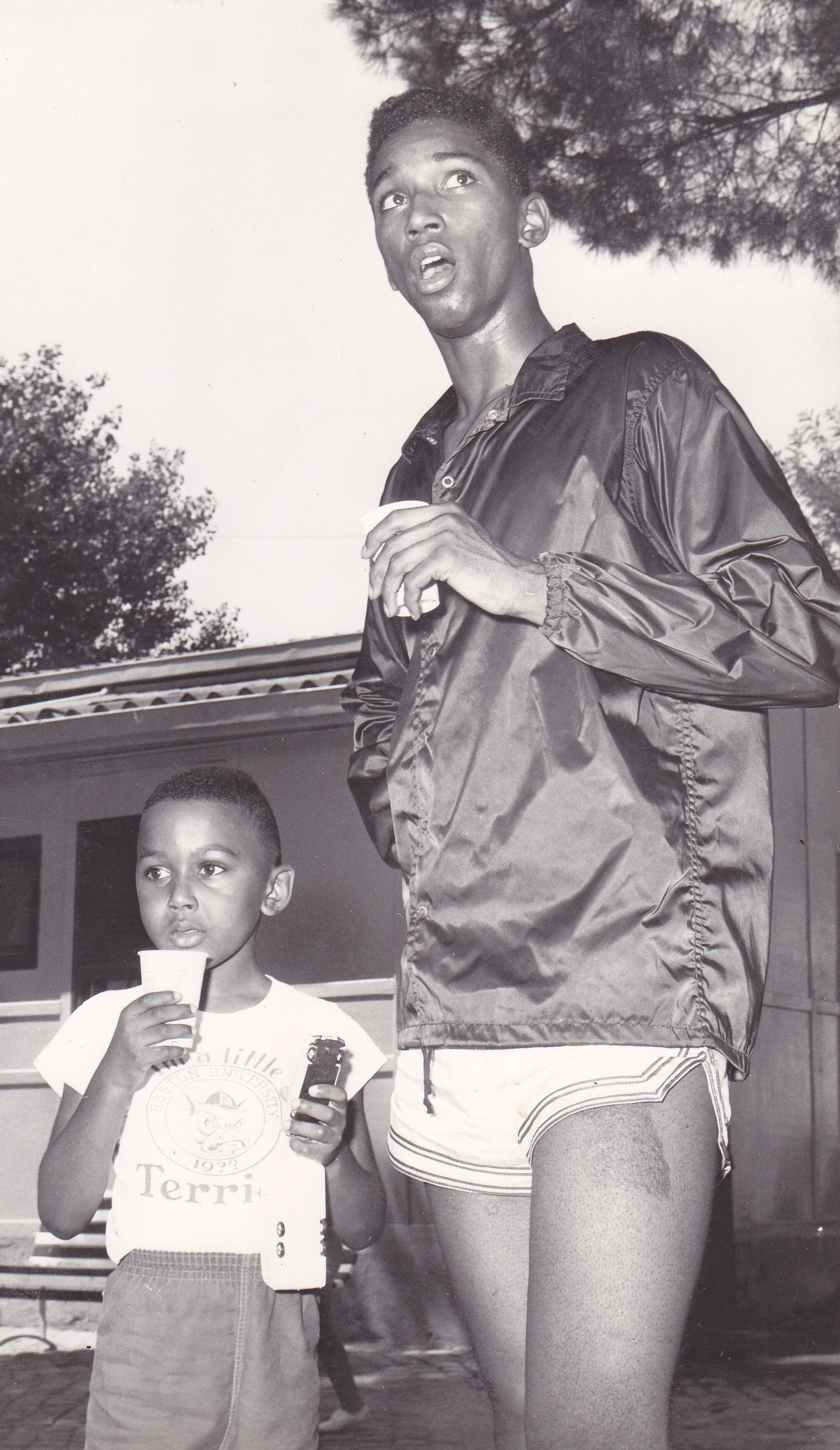
- John Thomas with brother at the 1960 Olympics

Personal information
- Born: March 3, 1941 Boston, Massachusetts, US
- Died: January 15, 2013 (aged 71) Brockton, Massachusetts, US
- Height: 1.96 m (6 ft 5 in)
- Weight: 88 kg (194 lb)

Sport
- Sport: High jump
- Club: Boston Athletic Association
Medal record
Representing the United States
Olympic Games
Bronze medal – third place	1960 Rome	High jump
Silver medal – second place	1964 Tokyo	High jump

John Curtis Thomas (March 3, 1941 – January 15, 2013) was an American track and field athlete who set several world records in the high jump using the straddle technique. As a youth, he earned the Eagle Scout award. At the age of 17, while a freshman at Boston University, Thomas became the first man to clear 7 feet (2.1 m) indoors. He subsequently pushed the world indoor record to 7 ft 1 1/2 in (2.172 m), and broke the world outdoor record three times, with a career best jump of 7 ft 3 3/4 in (2.229 m) in 1960, at the age of 19.

Thomas' meteoric career briefly captivated the track world, but he failed to win an Olympic gold medal, despite being favored to win in both the 1960 and 1964 Games.

In 1960, he settled for the bronze medal behind the USSR's Robert Shavlakadze (gold), and Valeriy Brumel (silver). Thomas's failure in 1960 on Thursday 1 September was accompanied by other failures that day by American favorites, and the day become known as 'Black Thursday'.

In 1964 he was again beaten by Brumel, who cleared the same top height as Thomas, but was declared the winner based on fewer misses at lower heights. John Rambo won the bronze in 1964.

Thomas is an inductee of the USATF Hall of Fame.

== Jumping orientation ==
Thomas planted his left foot for take-off and high kicked with his right leg that would lead over the bar.

== Biography ==
Thomas was born in Boston and grew up in Cambridge, Massachusetts. His father Curtis was a bus driver and his mother Ida was a kitchen employee at Harvard University.

He graduated from Boston University in 1963 with a bachelor's degree in physical and psychological rehabilitation.

Thomas retired from competition at the age of 27 and became a businessman. He later served as an assistant coach at Boston University and athletic director at Roxbury Community College.

Thomas died at age 71 while undergoing vascular surgery at a Brockton, Massachusetts hospital.

Records
Preceded by (Soviet Union) Yuri Stepanov	Men's High Jump World Record Holder; 1960-04-30 – 1961-06-18	Succeeded by (Soviet Union) Valeriy Brumel
