= Rudi Köppen =

German high jumper

Personal information
- Full name: Rudolf Köppen
- Nationality: German
- Born: 5 February 1943 (age 83) Rathenow, Nazi Germany

Sport
- Sport: Athletics
- Event: High jump

Rudolf "Rudi" Köppen (born 5 February 1943) is a German athlete. He competed in the men's high jump at the 1964 Summer Olympics.
