= A Death of Honor =

1987 novel by Joe Clifford Faust

- First edition
- Author: Joe Clifford Faust
- Cover artist: David B. Mattingly
- Language: English
- Genre: Science fiction
- Publisher: Del Rey Books
- Publication date: February 1987
- Publication place: United States
- Media type: Print (Paperback & Ebook)
- Pages: 326
- ISBN: 0-345-34026-4

A Death of Honor is a science fiction mystery novel by American author Joe Clifford Faust. It was published in 1987 by Del Rey Books.

== Plot summary ==
The novel is set in a crumbling 21st-century America. D. A. Payne, a bioengineer, is the prime suspect when a dead woman turns up in his apartment. He takes on the task of clearing himself but what he uncovers changes his life.

== Background ==
According to the author, A Death of Honor was originally envisioned as a collaboration between various authors. Having written the first chapter while working on his novel Desperate Measures, Faust decided to finish the book himself when the collaboration stalled. It was his first novel to be published.

== Award nominations ==
- 1988 – Locus Poll Award, Best First Novel nominee
