= Yuri Stepanov (serial killer) =

Russian serial killer

- Born: Yuri Grigorievich Stepanov; 1971 (age 54–55); Tyumen Oblast, RSFSR
- Other name: "Lesnoy"
- Conviction: Murder x7
- Penalty: Life imprisonment x7

Details
- Victims: 7
- Span of crimes: 2003–2008
- Country: Russia
- State: Tyumen
- Date apprehended: 1 June 2008

Yuri Grigorievich Stepanov (Russian: Юрий Григорьевич Степанов; born 1971), known as Lesnoy (Russian: Лесной), is a Russian serial killer who killed seven homeless men in the village of Voinovka, Tyumen Oblast between 2003 and 2008, some with his accomplice Nikolai Zarubin, whom he also later murdered. He was initially convicted for six of the murders in 2009 and sentenced to life imprisonment, and later admitted the seventh in 2019, for which he received another count of life imprisonment.

== Crimes ==
After serving six years in prison for an unspecified offence, Stepanov was released on 19 July 2002, and briefly travelled to Tuapse, Krasnodar Krai, where he met the woman who would become his girlfriend. After staying in the city for about a year, in May 2003, the couple returned to Tyumen, settling in a makeshift shack in the woods near the Voinovka Railway Station, surviving by collecting berries, mushrooms and non-ferrous metal. Using the salvaged metal, Yuri would sell it to a local scrap dealer, spending all the money on alcohol whenever he could.

The murders began on the morning of 16 August 2003, when Yuri and another homeless man visiting the landfill frequented by vagrants began quarrelling. In response, Stepanov grabbed an axe and hacked the man to death, burying the body with the help of his accomplice, Nikolai Zarubin. In an attempt to conceal the burial site, they covered it with leaves and dirt. Later that same month, Zarubin himself killed a homeless woman, and later called Stepanov for help with getting rid of the corpse. In September, the two men killed a vagrant who had stolen a sawn-off shotgun and cartridges for a hunting rifle from a nearby country house.

In January 2004, Yuri killed his friend, slashing him to death with an axe and then dumping his body in a nearby reservoir. Later that same month, he beat to death a bum named Khokhol, whom he had suspected of stealing scrap metal from him. According to his later confessions, Stepanov knocked down and kicked the unfortunate victim, before bludgeoning him to death using a metal pipe with a water tap screwed on at the end. In an effort to conceal the killing, he put the body in a green wheelbarrow and transported it out of the landfill, disposing of it a nearby sewer. In order to avoid capture, he temporarily moved to Moscow, where he is alleged to have worked at a construction site, before returning to Tyumen. This particular murder would remain undiscovered until Stepanov himself confessed to it years later.

In the months of January and March 2005, Yuri killed two men who he claimed to have shown a romantic interest in his partner. The final known murder would take place three years later, on 1 June 2008, in Yalutorovsk. On that date, Stepanov and several other vagrants, among them Stanislav Sakovich, were setting up mosquito nets in the basement garage of an old Motor-15 cooperative. Eventually, Yuri and Stanislav began arguing, and in retaliation, Stepanov pushed him further into the basement, where he strangled Sakovich. While he attempted to flee the area, word about the murder spread quickly, and after police were informed about the perpetrator's identity, they managed to detain Stepanov a few hours later.

== Trial and imprisonment ==
When brought to the police station, Yuri confessed to the murder of Sakovich and surprised the investigators by admitting five other murders he had committed over the years. As proof, he showed them the burial sites with the skeletonized bodies, proving his claims to be truthful. The case was sent over to the regional prosecutor of the Tyumen Oblast, who charged Stepanov with murder and concealment of a crime. In their subsequent indictment, the prosecutor's office noted that the accused man showed a great disregard and hatred for human life, and would pose an imminent danger to his fellow citizens if released. In 2009, Yuri Stepanov was found guilty of the six known murders and sentenced to life imprisonment in a special regime colony. He later tried to appeal his verdict to the Supreme Court, but his complaint was considered unfounded and ignored. Ten years after his initial sentence, Stepanov wrote down a confession letter in which he acknowledged the yet-undiscovered fourth murder, providing a detailed location of the burial site and details about the killing itself. He was brought to trial yet again, but this time with the participation of a jury. In a unanimous vote, he was found guilty but deserving of leniency, and given another life imprisonment term. His case was the second one in the District Court's history to be conducted via a jury vote.

== See also ==
- List of Russian serial killers
