= Eero Salminen =

Finnish high jumper

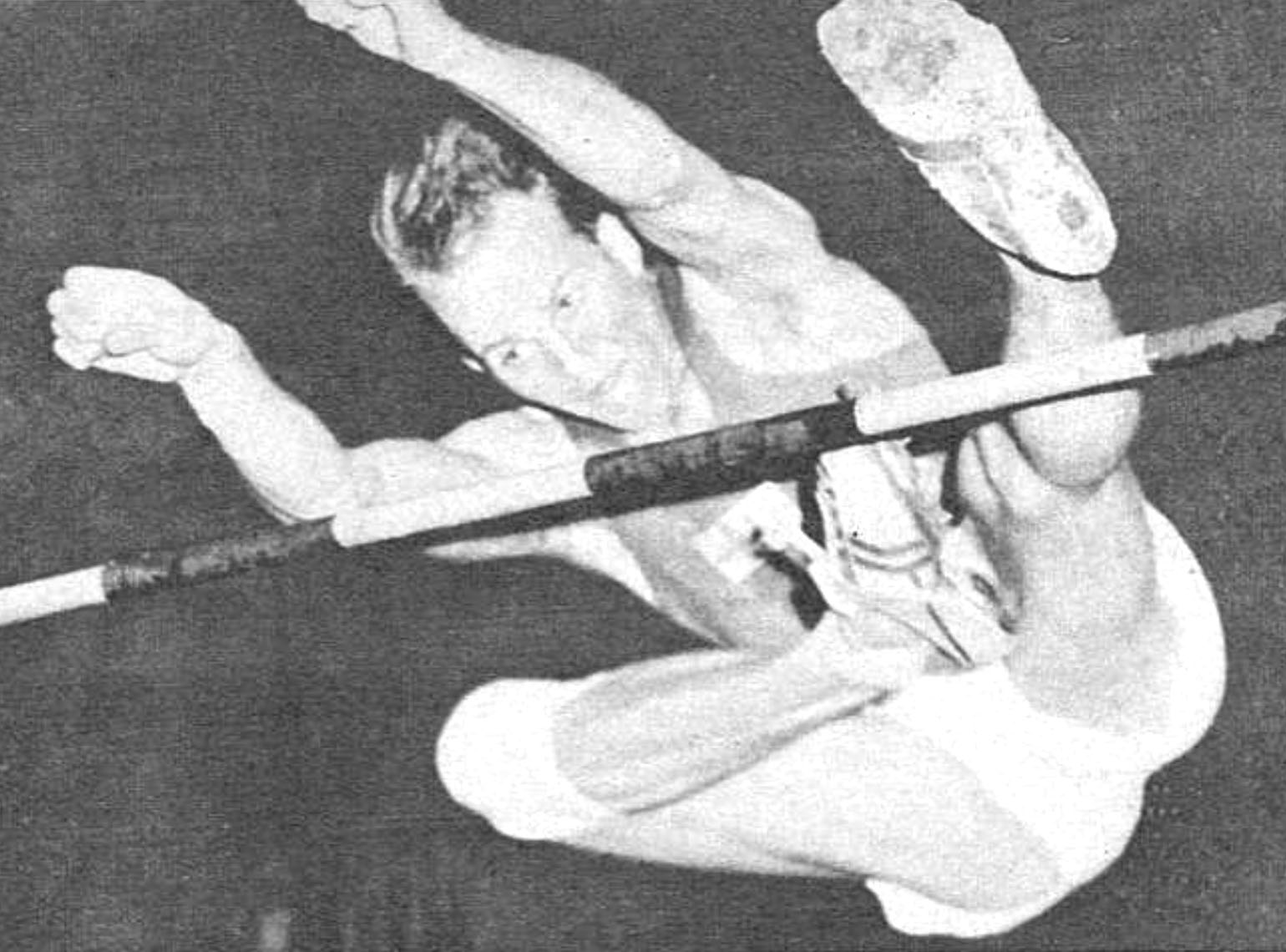
- Salminen in 1959

Personal information
- Nationality: Finnish
- Born: 18 October 1933 Kokkola, Finland
- Died: 6 June 1997 (aged 63) Helsinki, Finland

Sport
- Sport: Athletics
- Event: High jump

Eero Ilmari Salminen (18 October 1933 – 6 June 1997) was a Finnish athlete. He competed in the men's high jump at the 1960 Summer Olympics.
