= Kinya Miyazaki =

Japanese high jumper

Personal information
- Nationality: Japanese
- Born: 3 November 1938 (age 88)

Sport
- Sport: Athletics
- Event: High jump

Kinya Miyazaki (宮崎 欣也, Miyazaki Kin'ya; born 3 November 1938) is a Japanese track and field athlete. He competed in the men's high jump at the 1964 Summer Olympics.
