= Theo Püll =

German high jumper

Personal information
- Nationality: German
- Born: 30 September 1936 Viersen, Nazi Germany
- Died: December 2023

Sport
- Sport: Athletics
- Event: High jump

Theo Püll (30 September 1936 – December 2023) was a German athlete. He competed in the men's high jump at the 1960 Summer Olympics.

Püll died in December 2023
