= Ernie Shelton =

American high jumper (born 1932)

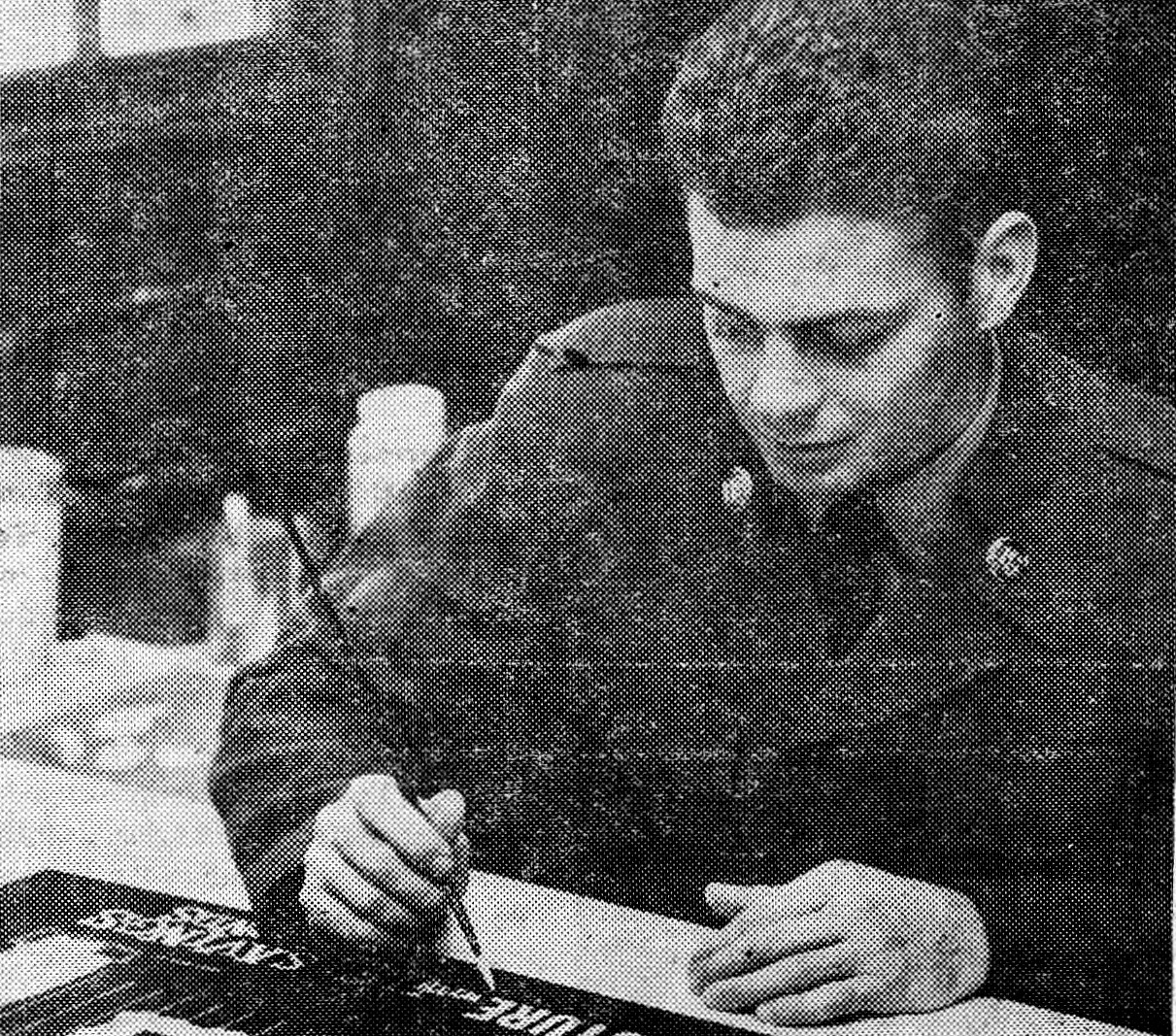
Shelton in 1957 working as an illustrator for the United States Army.

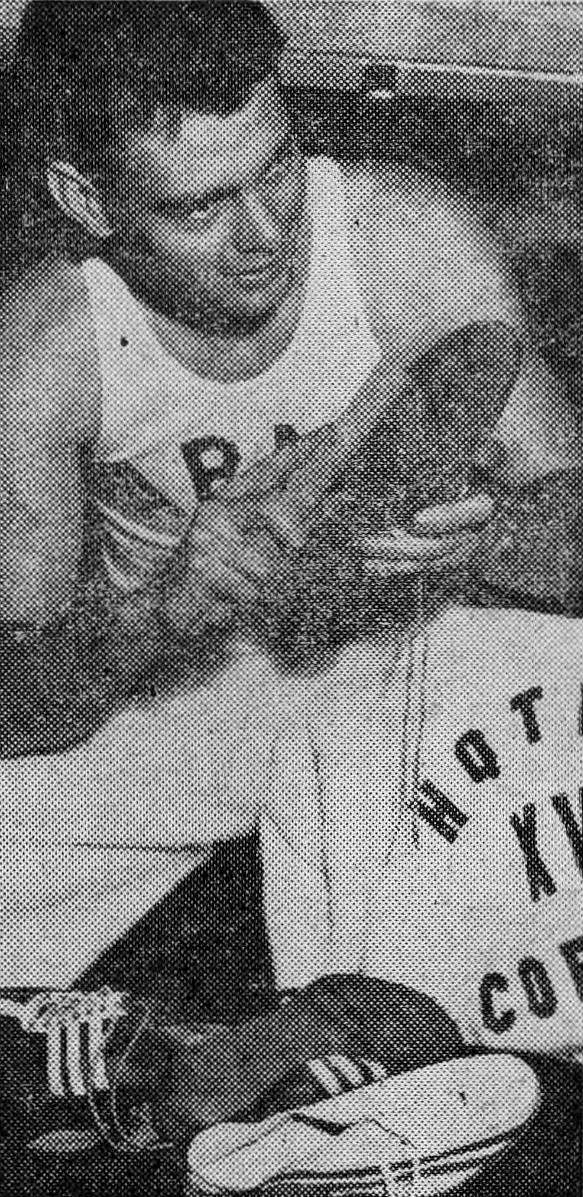
Shelton, circa 1958

Ernest ("Ernie") Earl Shelton (born October 28, 1932) was a male high jumper from the United States, who competed in the 1950s. He won the gold medal at the 1955 Pan American Games.

Shelton set his personal best in the men's high jump event (2.115 metres) on 1955-06-10 at a meet in his home town of Los Angeles. He failed to qualify for the 1956 Summer Olympics, finishing in fifth place (2.04 metres) at the 1956 US Olympic Trials. Shelton also competed in the decathlon.

He first competed for Washington Preparatory High School in Los Angeles, finishing in a 5-way tie for 2nd place at the 1951 CIF California State Meet. Next he went to the University of Southern California where he won the NCAA Outdoor Track and Field Championships twice in a row. He won the USA Outdoor Track and Field Championships in both 1954 and 1955 (1955 tied with Charles Dumas who at the time was still at Centennial High School (Compton, California) who would win the Olympic Gold medal the following year Both Dumas and Shelton were in a race to become the first man to clear 7 feet, with Dumas getting the honor. It was crushing to Shelton, who never did clear 7 feet.

Shelton has gone on to become a celebrated sculptor, working from his studio in Cambria, California. He has worked as an Imagineer on the original Disneyland creating a statue in the Ancient Cambodian City section of the Jungle Cruise attraction as well as work at EPCOT and Tokyo Disneyland. He sculpted numerous artworks for the Academy of Television Arts & Sciences headquarters in North Hollywood, including life-sized statues of Johnny Carson, Jack Benny, Lucille Ball and Desi Arnaz. He has also contributed to special effects pieces for RoboCop, Total Recall, Legend and other motion pictures.

== Achievements ==
Year	Tournament	Venue	Result	Height
1951	USA Outdoor Track and Field Championships	Berkeley, California	3rd	1.93 m
1953	USA Outdoor Track and Field Championships	Dayton, Ohio	2nd	2.02 m
1954	USA Outdoor Track and Field Championships	St. Louis, Missouri	1st	2.07 m
1955	Pan American Games	Mexico City, Mexico	1st	2.01 m
1955	USA Outdoor Track and Field Championships	Boulder, Colorado	1st	2.08 m
1956	USA Outdoor Track and Field Championships	Bakersfield, California	2nd	2.04 m
1957	USA Outdoor Track and Field Championships	Dayton, Ohio	2nd	2.06 m
1958	USA Outdoor Track and Field Championships	Bakersfield, California	6th	1.98 m
