= Joe Clifford Faust =

American author

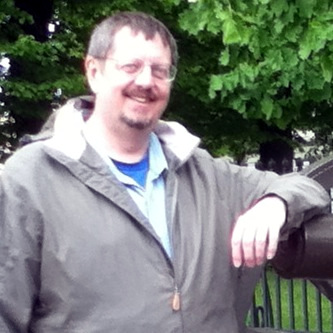
- Faust in May 2012
- Born: 1957 (age 68–69); Williston, North Dakota, U.S.
- Education: Oklahoma Christian University
- Occupations: Novelist, freelance writer
- Spouse: Connie Sweitzer Faust
- Writing career
- Genres: Mystery and thrillers, science fiction & fantasy, cyberpunk
- Website: joecliffordfaust.com

Joe Clifford Faust (born 1957) is an American author best known for his seven science fiction novels which were primarily written during the 1980s and 1990s, including A Death of Honor, The Company Man, the Angel's Luck Trilogy (all published by Del Rey Books), and the satirical Pembroke Hall novels (published by Bantam Spectra). His novels are known for their tightly controlled plots and their sense of humor. He has been a guest at Confluence, the Pittsburgh science fiction and fantasy convention.

Like many authors, he draws inspiration from previous and current occupations, including projectionist, record store clerk, radio announcer, sheriff's dispatcher, and advertising copywriter. He currently works as a freelance writer alongside other creative projects such as occasional forays into cartooning and songwriting. From 2001 to 2008, he served as a freelance producer for a local cable music program, Random Acts of Music.

== Biography ==
Faust was born in Williston, North Dakota, but has said that he considers Gillette, Wyoming, his adopted home town. He currently lives with his family in his wife's ancestral home in Ohio—a 140-year-old plot of land signed over to the family by President James K. Polk. He works as a copywriter at an advertising firm while maintaining his career as a freelance writer. He is writing a new novel about UFOs. While Faust does not write Christian fiction, he is a member of the Church of Christ.

== Thief Media ==
On February 16, 2011, Faust announced on his blog that he had created a publishing company called Thief Media as an outlet to distribute his out-of-print novels in e-book formats. Releases began with the Amazon Kindle version of "A Death of Honor" on June 9, the previously unpublished "The Mushroom Shift" on December 12, 2011, and "The Company Man" on July 14, 2012. Another previously unpublished novel, "Trust" is scheduled to for publication as well. Faust also announced the completion of a new novel in the same post.

== Amazon Kindle Press ==
On December 13, 2014, Amazon's Kindle Press announced the selection of Faust's thriller "Drawing Down the Moon" from the Kindle Scout program for publication. As with all Kindle Scout participating writers, Faust had entered his novel into the program the previous month for a 30-day period in which readers could nominate his work. According to Amazon's Kindle Scout, "Kindle Scout is reader-powered publishing for new, never-before-published books. It's a place where readers help decide if a book gets published."

Drawing Down the Moon 's publication marks the first time Faust has published a novel outside of the science fiction genre (with the exception of his own Thief Media's release of The Mushroom Shift) as well as his first newly written published novel since 1997.

== Bibliography ==
=== Series ===
• Desperate Measures (1989) • Precious Cargo (1989) • The Essence of Evil (1990)

Pembroke Hall

• Ferman's Devils (1996) • Boddekker's Demons (1997)

=== Novels ===
• A Death of Honor (1987)
• The Company Man (1988)
• The Mushroom Shift (2011)
• Drawing Down the Moon (2015)
• The Smart One (2022)

=== Plays ===
• Old Loves Die Hard (1986)

=== Omnibus editions ===
• Handling It: How I Got Rich and Famous, Made Media Stars Out of Common Street Scum and Almost Got the Girl (1997) - Science Fiction Book Club edition combining Ferman's Devils and Boddekker's Demons.
• Fermans Devals (2023) - "Author's Intended Edition" combining Ferman's Devils and Boddekker's Demons as a single novel with bonus features.

== Awards ==
Addy Award (Canton Ad Club) for Copywriting - 1988 - 1997 - 1998
