= John Rambo (athlete) =

American basketball player and high jumper (1943–2022)

Personal information
- Born: John Barnett Rambo; August 9, 1943 Atlanta, Texas, U.S.
- Died: January 8, 2022 (aged 78) Paramount, California, U.S.
- Height: 2.00 m (6 ft 7 in)
- Weight: 86 kg (190 lb)

Sport
- Sport: Athletics
- Event: High jump
- Club: Southern California Striders, Anaheim

Achievements and titles
- Personal best: 2.21 m (1967)
Medal record
Men's athletics
Representing United States
Olympic Games
Bronze medal – third place	1964 Tokyo	High jump

John Barnett Rambo (August 9, 1943 – January 8, 2022) was an American professional basketball player and high jumper, who won a bronze medal in the 1964 Tokyo Olympic Games.

== Basketball career ==
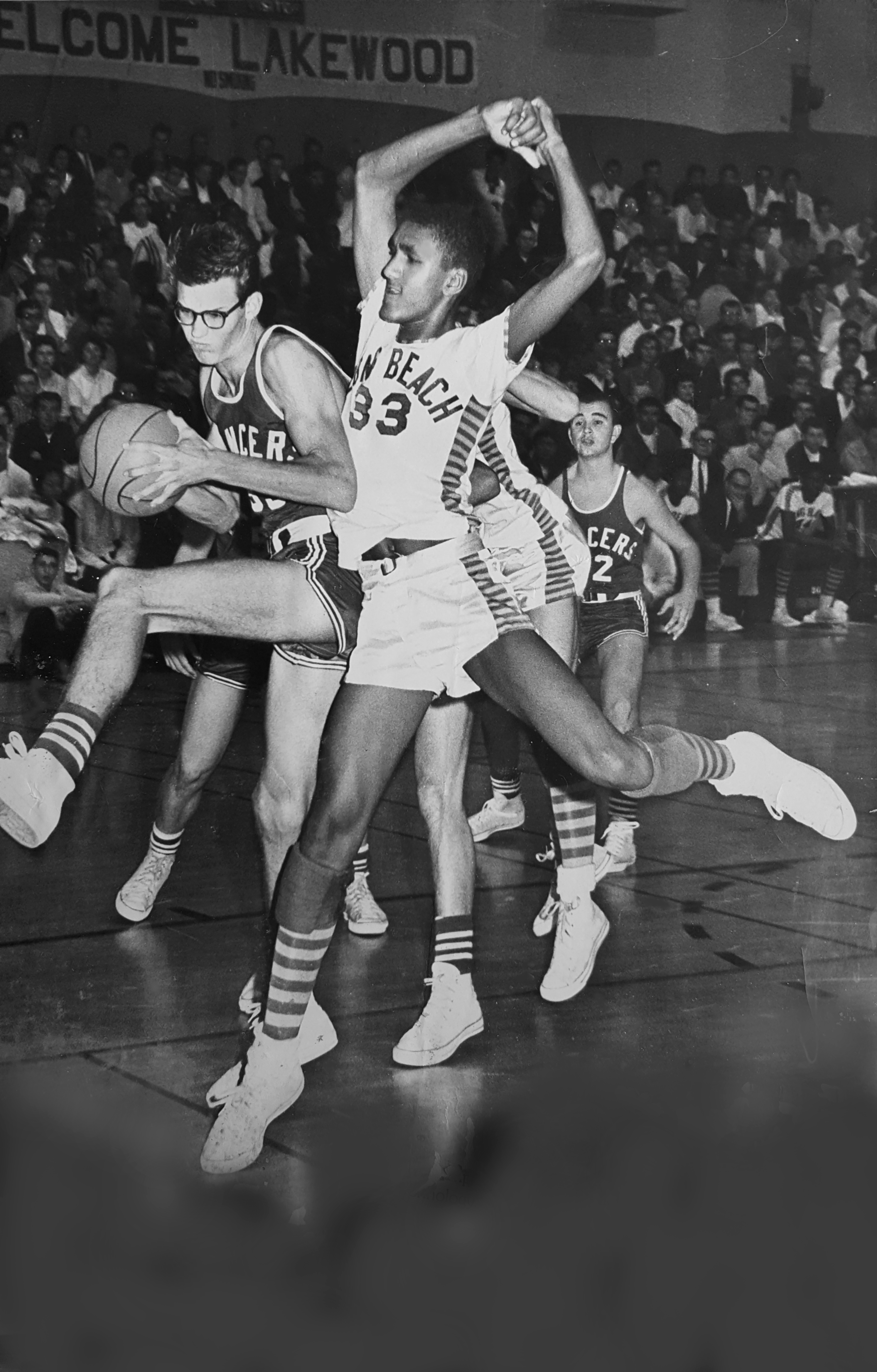
Rambo at Long Beach Polytechnic High School, playing against Lakewood

Rambo graduated from Long Beach Polytechnic High School in 1961. While studying history at California State University (CSULB), also known as Long Beach State, Rambo played on the 49ers basketball team, averaging 19.8 points and 11 rebounds per game for two years. He was the California Collegiate Athletic Association first-team all-star choice in 1963-64 and 1964–65. He scored 20.3 points per game and 12.7 rebounds per game. Against San Diego, Rambo scored 42 points and had 31 rebounds.

In 1964, the year of his graduation, Rambo was a two-time NCAA High Jump Champion and won an Olympic bronze medal in the Tokyo Games.

In 1965, Rambo was drafted in the sixth round by the St. Louis Hawks of the NBA, but never actually played. Then injuries forced him from the professional basketball court for several seasons.

== Athletic career ==
In 1967, as a member of the Southern California Striders Track and Field Club, Rambo became a two-time Amateur Athletic Union (AAU) Indoor Champion in 1967 and 1969.

In 1967 Rambo was chosen AAU Alumnus of the Year. His tie for the fourth place at the 1968 Olympic trials did not secure him a place on the U.S. Olympic team. On February 13, 1969, the Coronado Eagle and Journal reported, “Rambo is a co-holder of the American indoor record of 7-3 and always a colorful performer. He almost made the Rockets basketball team last year, being the last man cut.”

In 1971, Rambo was named one of the National Jaycees' "Outstanding Young Men in America." Rambo was inducted into the California State University, Long Beach, Sports Hall of Fame in 1986. In 2002, Rambo was inducted into the Long Beach City College Hall of Champions. In 2006, the Century Club honored him for providing "One of the Best Moments in the City of Long Beach History."

== Personal life ==
Rambo was divorced and had four children. He died from a heart attack in Paramount, California, on January 8, 2022, at the age of 78.
