= Gianpiero Cordovani =

Italian former high jumper

Personal information
- National team: Italy: 8 (1957-1960)
- Born: 25 May 1938 Pisogne, Italy
- Died: 2017 (aged 78–79) Brescia, Italy

Sport
- Sport: Athletics
- Event: High jump
- Club: Fiamme Oro Padova

Achievements and titles
- Personal best: High jump: 1.98 m (1960)

Gianpiero Cordovani (25 May 1938 – 2017) was an Italian high jumper.

== Career ==
Three-time national champion at senior level in high jump from 1957 to 1959, boasts 8 caps in the Italy national athletics team.

== National titles ==
Cordovani won three national championships in a row at individual senior level.

- Italian Athletics Championships
  - High jump: 1957, 1958, 1959
