= Bengt Nilsson (athlete) =

Swedish high jumper

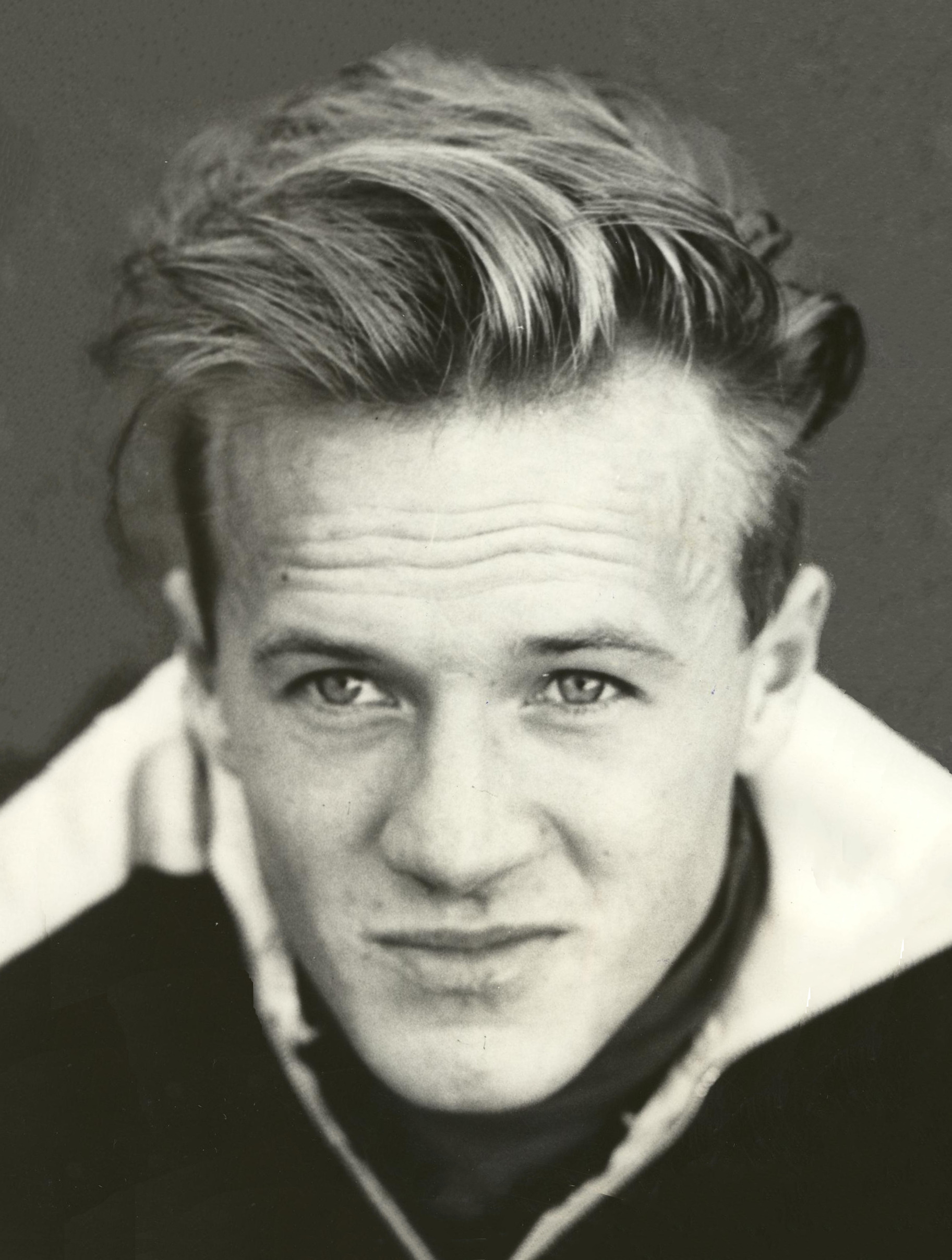
- Bengt Nilsson in the 1950s

Personal information
- Born: 17 February 1934 Härnösand, Sweden
- Died: 11 May 2018 (aged 84) Solna, Sweden
- Height: 1.81 m (5 ft 11 in)
- Weight: 67 kg (148 lb)

Sport
- Sport: Athletics
- Event: High jump
- Club: Westermalms IF

Achievements and titles
- Personal best: 2.114 m (1954)
Medal record
Men's athletics
Representing Sweden
European Championships
Gold medal – first place	1954 Bern	High jump

Bengt Nilsson (17 February 1934 – 11 May 2018) was a Swedish high jumper. In 1954 he won the Swedish and European titles and set a European record at 2.11 m; later that year he was awarded the Svenska Dagbladet Gold Medal.

Nilsson was injured at the 1956 Summer Olympics and finished only 26th. He retired from athletics shortly thereafter.
