= Zdeněk Matějka =

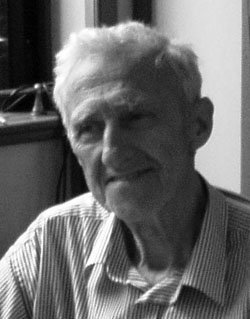
- Born: 30 April 1937; Teplice, Czechoslovakia
- Died: 2 October 2006 (aged 69); Prague, Czech Republic
- Education: Institute of Chemical Technology in Prague
- Known for: ion exchange water treatment
- Scientific career
- Fields: chemistry
- Workplaces: Institute of Chemical Technology in Prague
- Doctoral advisor: František Karas

Zdeněk Matějka (30 April 1937 – 2 October 2006) was a Czech chemist known for his contributions to development of ion exchange.

== Life and work ==
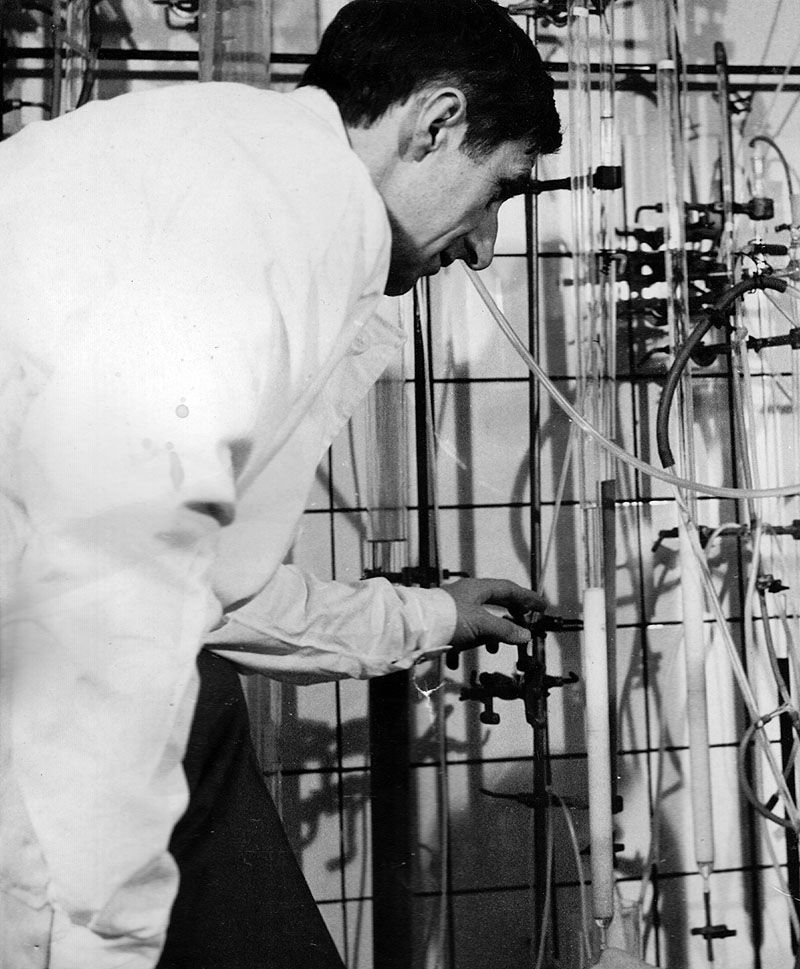
Matějka working at ČKD Dukla

Zdeněk Matějka was born on 30 April 1937 in Teplice. In 1955 he moved to Prague, to study chemistry at Institute of Chemical Technology in Prague. He received his master's degree in 1960. While working in Water Research Institute of ČKD Dukla corp., he started external doctor course at Department of Heat Engineering, Institute of Chemical Technology in Prague. His supervisor was Prof. František Karas, founder of the department. In 1967 he received his PhD degree for his research on electrodeionization of water. Later, in 1972, he moved from industry to university. For many years he worked as assistant professor on fundamentals of ion exchange.

In 1990, after the Velvet Revolution, he was promoted to associate professor. His research group worked mainly on selective removal of heavy metals via chelating ion exchangers and removal of nitrates from water. In 1997, he became head of Department of Power Engineering. For his teaching and scientific achievements, he was promoted to full professor in 2000. He retired soon after in 2002 at age of 65 (mandatory retirement) but he was still leading his research group working on part-time. Zdeněk Matějka died in Prague after a long illness on 2 October 2006.

During his work at Institute of Chemical Technology in Prague he supervised about 60 MSc and 20 PhD students. He established numerous scientific contacts worldwide namely in Japan, Germany, the United States, the United Kingdom and Turkey.
