= René Maurer =

Swiss high jumper

Personal information
- Nationality: Swiss
- Born: 6 April 1936 (age 90)

Sport
- Sport: Athletics
- Event: High jump

René Maurer (born 6 April 1936) is a Swiss athlete. He competed in the men's high jump at the 1960 Summer Olympics.
