= Mohamed Abdul Razzak =

Iraqi high jumper (born 1933)

Personal information
- Nationality: Iraqi
- Born: 1933 (age 91–92) Basra, Iraq
- Height: 1.77 m (5 ft 10 in)
- Weight: 68 kg (150 lb)

Sport
- Sport: Athletics

Mohamed Ali Abdul Razzak (born 1933) is an Iraqi high jumper. He competed in the 1960 Summer Olympics.
