= Yuri Stepanov (athlete) =

Personal information
- Born: 30 August 1932 Saint Petersburg, Russia
- Died: 13 September 1963 (aged 31) Saint Petersburg, Russia
- Height: 1.83 m (6 ft 0 in)

Sport
- Sport: High jump

Yuri Nikolaevich Stepanov (Russian: Юрий Николаевич Степанов; 30 August 1932 – 13 September 1963) was a Soviet track and field athlete who specialized in the high jump and long jump. On 13 July 1957 he set a new world record in the high jump at 2.16 m (7 ft 1 in), breaking a 44-year-long dominance of American athletes in this event. In the high jump, Stepanov won the Soviet title in 1954 and 1958 and finished second in 1953 and 1957.

Stepanov started training in the high jump in 1950, aged 17, and by 1954 had a personal best at 1.98 m. In parallel, he competed in the long jump, and in 1956 won a national competition with a decent result of 7.43 m. He was selected for the 1956 Olympics, but was replaced due to a leg injury. He was the gold medallist at both the 1957 World University Games and the World Festival of Youth and Students. He twice competed at the European Athletics Championships, finishing fifth in 1954 and sixth in 1958.

In 1957 he set a world record at a Leningrad-Helsinki athletic meet. A close-up photograph taken during the event showed that Stepanov used shoes with thick porous soles that acted as a trampoline. While not forbidden by the rules, the use of such shoes was criticized by the foreign media, but was countered by the Soviets that the thick sole was added merely to reduce the risk of injury. After this event, the thickness of the sole was limited to 12 mm by the IAAF. As a result of excessive media attention to the validity of his results, around 1959 Stepanov developed a depression that resulted in his hospitalization in 1959, alcoholism, divorce in 1961 and suicide in 1963.

== See also ==
- Men's high jump world record progression

Records
| Preceded by Charles Dumas | Men's high jump world record holder 13 July 1957– 30 April 1960-04-30 | Succeeded by John Thomas |
