= Çetin Şahiner =

Turkish hurdler (1934–2017)

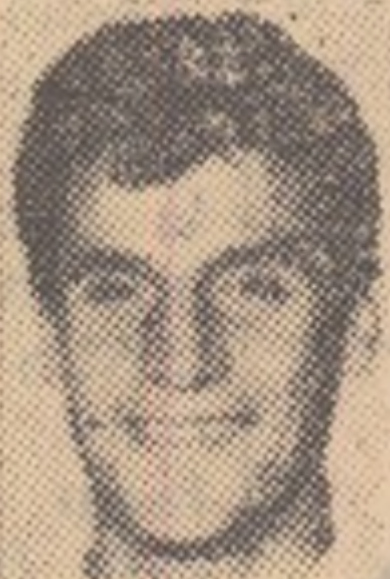

Personal information
- Nationality: Turkish
- Born: 13 October 1934 Ankara, Turkey
- Died: 3 August 2017 (aged 82) Ankara, Turkey

Sport
- Sport: Track and field
- Event: 110 metres hurdles

Çetin Şahiner (13 October 1934 – 3 August 2017) was a Turkish hurdler. He competed in the 110 metres hurdles at the 1960 Summer Olympics and the 1964 Summer Olympics. Şahiner was the flag bearer for Turkey in the opening ceremony of the 1964 Summer Olympics.
