= Peter Riebensahm =

German high jumper (born 1938)

Personal information
- Nationality: German
- Born: 30 May 1938 (age 88) Braunsberg in Ostpreußen, Germany

Sport
- Sport: Athletics
- Event: High jump

Peter Riebensahm (born 30 May 1938) is a German athlete. He competed in the men's high jump at the 1960 Summer Olympics.

Riebensahm won four silver medals at the West German championships; in 1958, 1960, 1961 and 1962. He represented the clubs ATSV Bremerhaven and from 1962 USC Mainz. Indoors, he won bronze in 1959, silver in 1960 and 1961, and gold in 1962.
