= Đorđe Majtan =

Serbian high jumper

Personal information
- Native name: Ђорђе Мајтан
- Born: 1 January 1939 (age 86) Novi Sad

Sport
- Country: Yugoslavia
- Sport: Athletics
- Event: High jump

Đorđe Majtan (Serbian Cyrillic: Ђорђе Мајтан; also transliterated Djordje; born 1 January 1939 in Novi Sad) is a retired Serbian high jumper who represented SFR Yugoslavia at the 1960 Summer Olympics and won 26th place. He was a member of the Athletics Club Red Star Belgrade.
