= Cornel Porumb =

Romanian high jumper

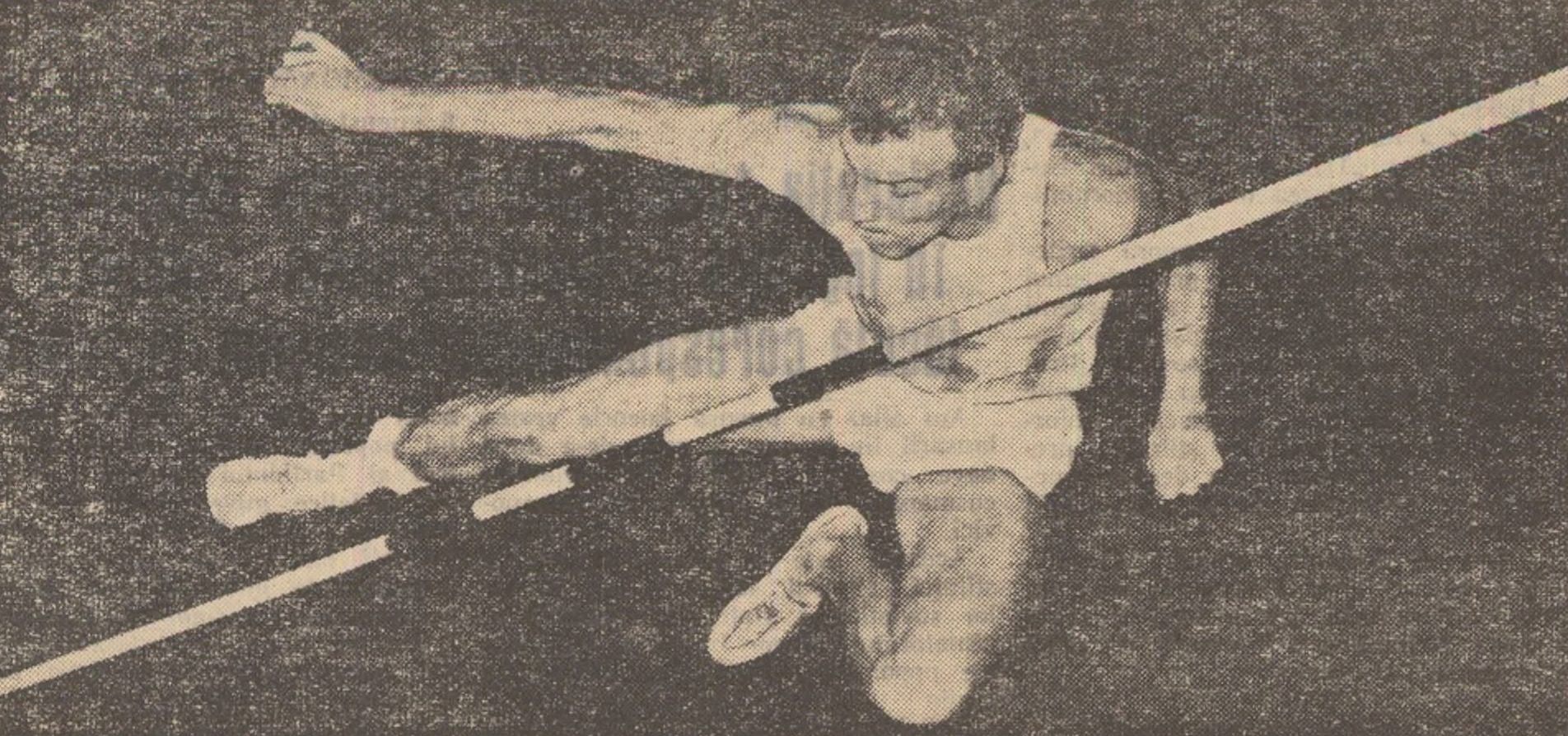
- Porumb in 1961

Personal information
- Born: 11 May 1939 Sibiu, Romania
- Died: 12 January 2007 (aged 67) Cluj-Napoca, Romania

Sport
- Sport: Track and field
- Event: High jump
Medal record
Representing Romania
Summer Universiade
| Gold medal – first place | 1959 Turin | High jump |

Cornel Porumb (11 May 1939 – 12 January 2007) was a Romanian high jumper who competed in the 1960 Summer Olympics. He was born in Sibiu.
