= Werner Pfeil =

German high jumper

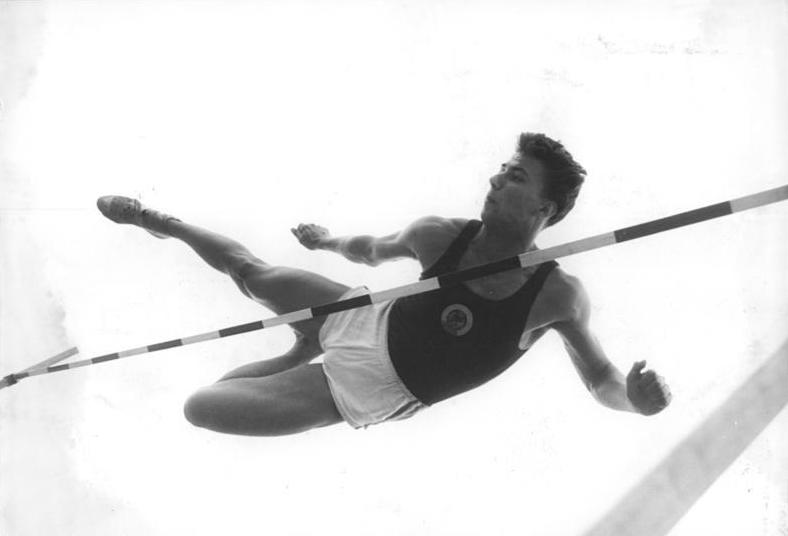
- Werner Pfeil in 1958

Personal information
- Nationality: German
- Born: 19 December 1937 Jüterbog, Nazi Germany
- Died: 10 July 2019 (aged 81)

Sport
- Sport: Athletics
- Event: High jump

Werner Pfeil (19 December 1937 – 10 July 2019) was a German athlete. He competed in the men's high jump at the 1960 Summer Olympics.
