= Sándor Noszály (high jumper) =

Hungarian high jumper

Personal information
- Nationality: Hungarian
- Born: 8 March 1940 Nagykálló, Hungary
- Died: 27 January 2001 (aged 60) Budapest, Hungary

Sport
- Sport: Athletics
- Event: High jump

Sándor Noszály (8 March 1940 – 27 January 2001) was a Hungarian athlete. He competed in the men's high jump at the 1960 Summer Olympics.
