= Jiří Lanský =

Czech high jumper (1933–2017)

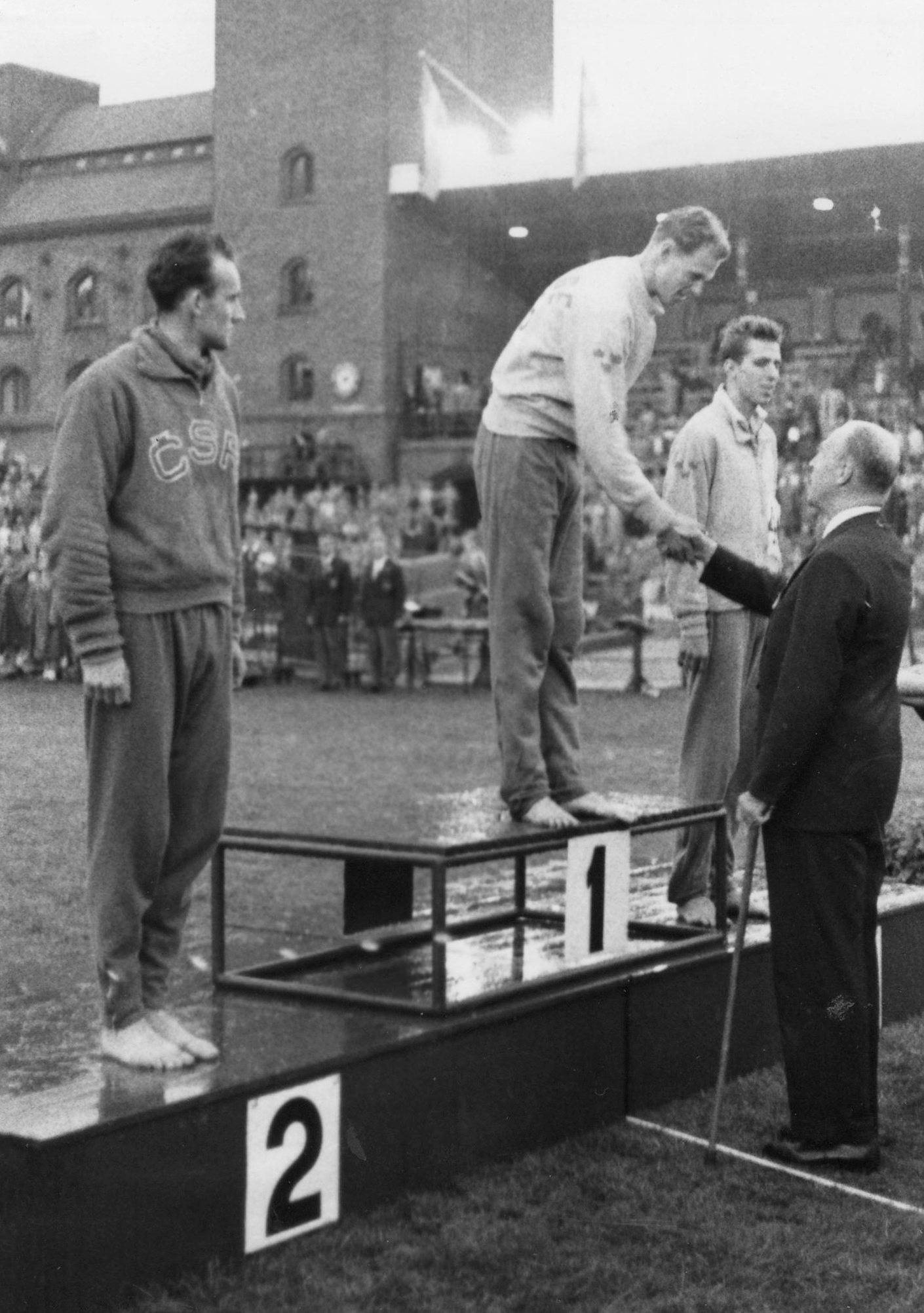
- Jiří Lanský (left) at the 1958 European Championships

Personal information
- Born: 17 September 1933 Prague, Czechoslovakia
- Died: 14 February 2017 (aged 83)
- Height: 1.90 m (6 ft 3 in)
- Weight: 88 kg (194 lb)

Sport
- Sport: Athletics
- Event: High jump
- Club: Bohemians Praha

Achievements and titles
- Personal best: 2.10 (1958)
Medal record
Men's athletics
Representing Czechoslovakia
European Championships
Silver medal – second place	1954 Bern	High jump
Silver medal – second place	1958 Stockholm	High jump

Jiří Lanský (17 September 1933 – 14 February 2017) was a Czech high jumper who won silver medals at the 1954 and 1958 European Championships. He finished seventh at the 1960 Summer Olympics.
