= Valeriy Brumel =

Soviet high jumper (1942–2003)

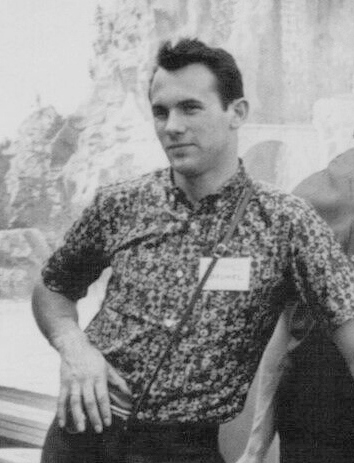
- Brumel in California in 1963

Personal information
- Born: Valeriy Nikolayevich Brumel; 14 April 1942 Razvedki, Amur Oblast, Russian SFSR, Soviet Union
- Died: 26 January 2003 (aged 60) Moscow, Russia
- Height: 185 cm (6 ft 1 in)
- Weight: 79 kg (174 lb)

Sport
- Sport: Athletics
- Event: High jump
- Club: Burevestnik Moscow
- Retired: 1970

Achievements and titles
- Personal best: 2.28 m (7 ft 5.8 in) (1963)
Medal record
Men's athletics
Representing the Soviet Union
Olympic Games
| Gold medal – first place | 1964 Tokyo | High jump |
| Silver medal – second place | 1960 Rome | High jump |
European Championships
| Gold medal – first place | 1962 Belgrade | High jump |
Universiade
| Gold medal – first place | 1961 Sofia | High jump |
| Gold medal – first place | 1963 Porto Alegre | High jump |

Valeriy Nikolayevich Brumel (Russian: Валерий Николаевич Брумель; 14 April 1942 – 26 January 2003) was a Soviet-Russian high jumper. The 1964 Olympic champion and multiple world record holder, he is regarded as one of the greatest athletes ever to compete in the high jump. His international career was ended by a motorcycle crash in 1965.

== Early life and education ==
Brumel was born in a far eastern Siberian village to a family of geologists exploring the region. His father was of German descent. They later moved to Luhansk and taught at a local university.

== Athletic career ==
Brumel took up the high jump at age 12 in Lugansk, coached by P. S. Shtein. Aged 16 he cleared 2 metres (6 ft 7 in) using the then dominant straight-leg straddle technique. He improved his skills under the coaching of V. M. Dyachkov in Moscow. In 1960 he broke the USSR record, 2.17 metres (7 ft 1 in), and was selected for the Olympic team. At the 1960 Summer Olympics, he cleared the same height as the winner Robert Shavlakadze, but made more attempts and thus was awarded a silver medal.

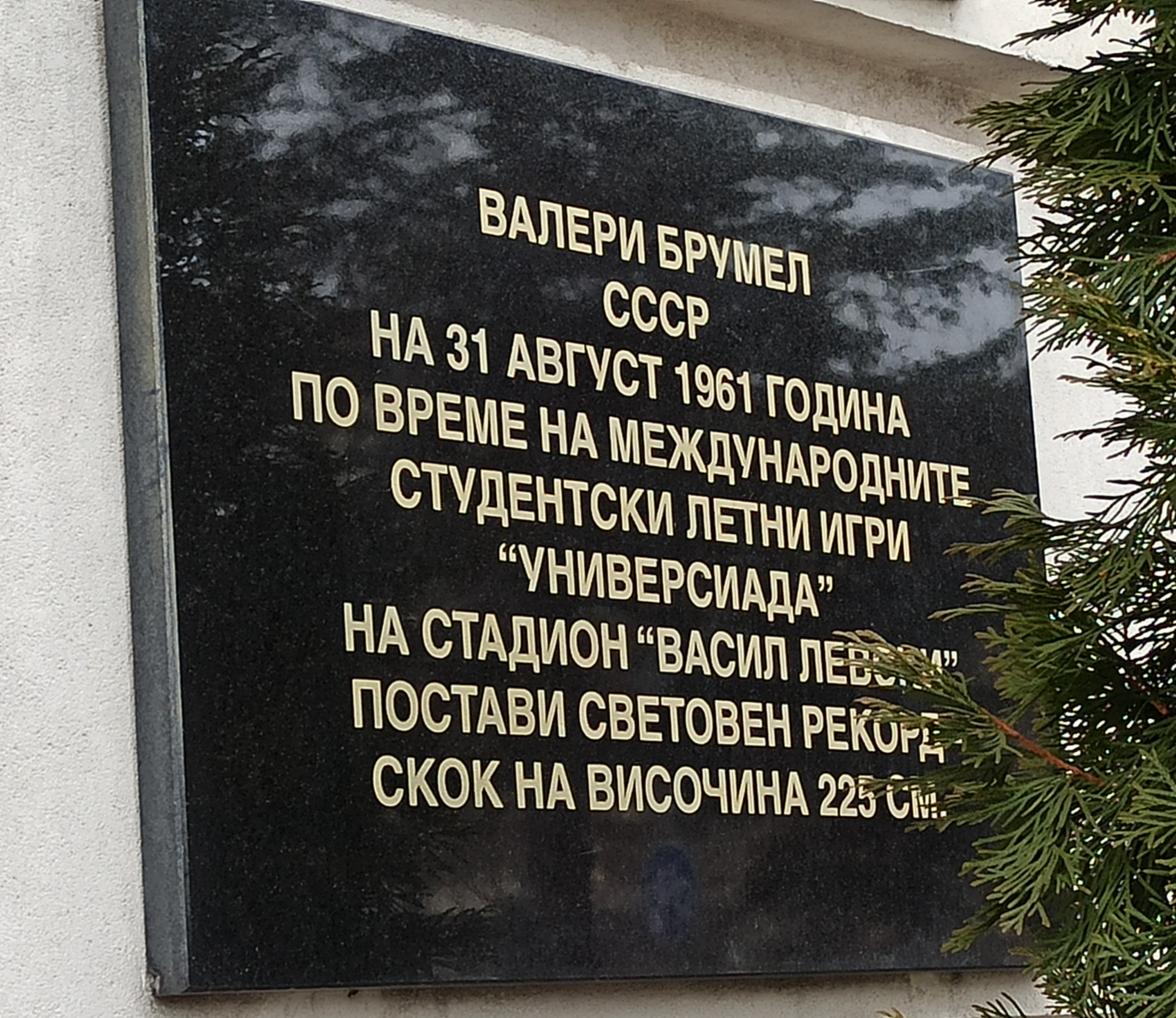
A plaque in Bulgarian on Vasil Levski National Stadium, Sofia, commemorating Brumel's world record of 2.25 m set on 31 August 1961

In 1961–1963 he broke his own world record in the high jump six times, improving it from 2.23 metres (7 ft 4 in) to 2.28 metres (7 ft 6 in). He also won the high jump at the 1961 and 1963 Universiade, 1962 European Championships, the USSR Championships of 1961–1963, and the 1964 Summer Olympics.

After going undefeated during the 1965 season, Brumel suffered a multiple fracture in his right foot in a motorcycle crash, and faced an amputation. He was operated on successfully by professor Gavriil Ilizarov with a new leg-lengthening procedure using his external fixator. Yet even after 29 surgeries, he could not fully recover. He retired in 1970 after jumping 2.06 metres (6 ft 9 in) at local competitions.

== Retirement from athletics ==
In retirement Brumel turned to acting and writing. He starred in the film Sport, Sport, Sport (1970) and wrote the script for Pravo na pryzhok (The Right to Jump, 1973). He also wrote numerous novels and plays, including the novel Don't Change Yourself (1979), which was translated into seven languages, and the libretto to Rauf Hajiyev's operetta Golden Caravel (Золотая каравелла).

== Personal life ==
Brumel had two brothers, Oleg (1944–2005) and Igor, a Russian politician born in 1952 in Rostov. Brumel was married three times. His first wife, Marina, was a gymnastics instructor. She left him with a son in 1965, when Brumel was recovering from his motorcycle crash. In 1973 Brumel married Yelena Petushkova, an equestrian and 1972 Olympic champion in dressage. The couple divorced 18 months later, citing irreconcilable differences. They had a daughter, Vlada Petushkova, born in 1974, who was raised by her mother. In 1992 Brumel married Svetlana Belousova, who later founded and managed the Valeriy Brumel Fund. They had a son Viktor.

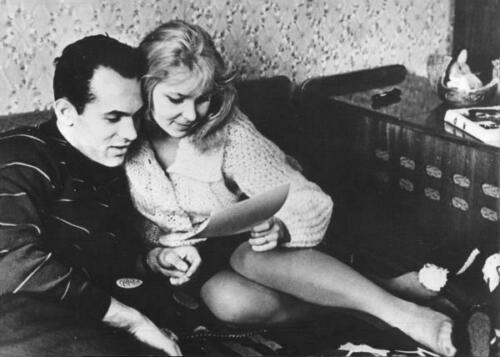
Brumel with his first wife in 1963

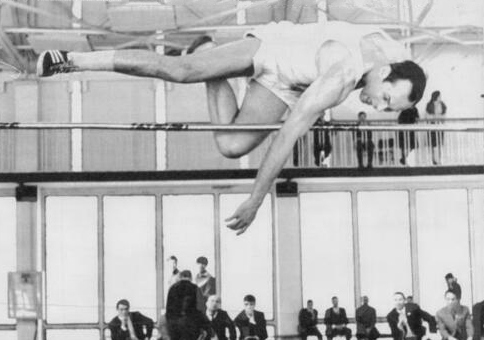
Brumel jumping at a meet

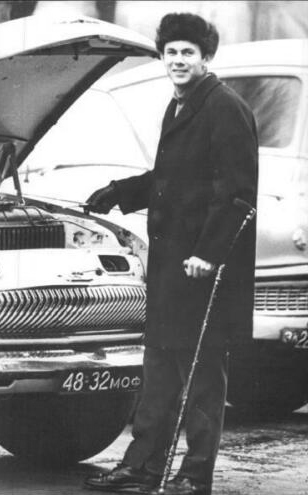
Brumel after his leg injury

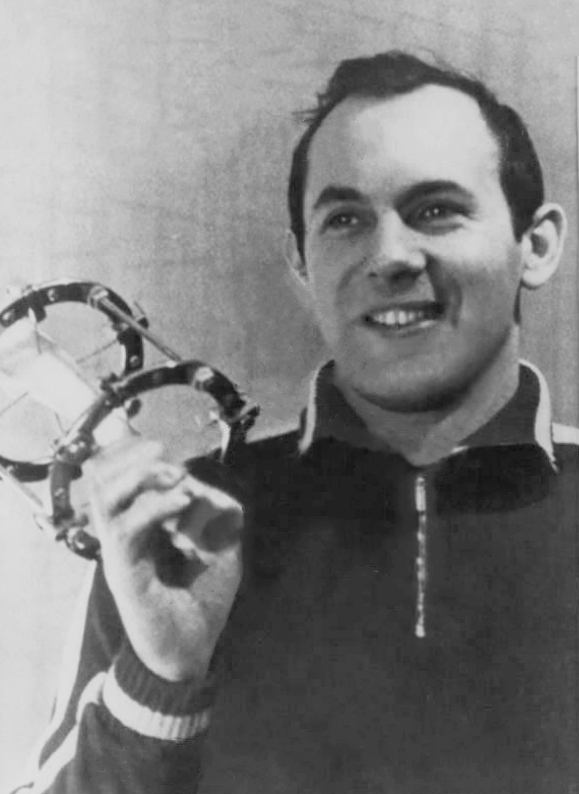
Brumel in 1968 and Ilizarov apparatus that restored his crushed leg

Records
| Preceded by (United States) John Thomas | Men's High Jump World Record Holder; 1961-06-18 – 1970-11-08 | Succeeded by (United States) Pat Matzdorf |
