= Robert Shavlakadze =

Soviet high jumper (1933–2020)

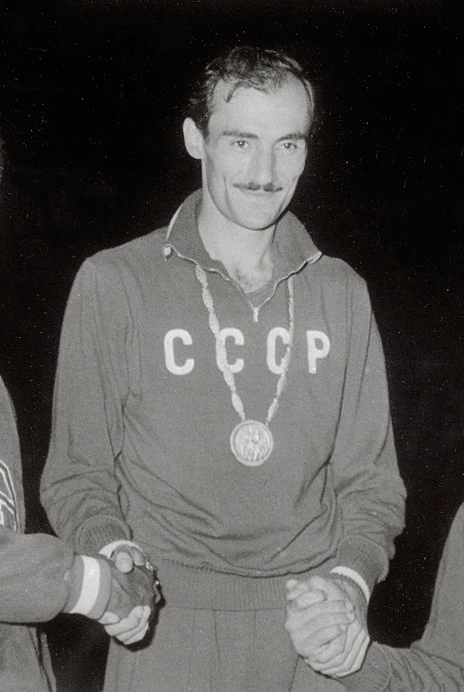
- Shavlakadze at the 1960 Olympics

Personal information
- Born: 1 April 1933 Tbilisi, Georgian SSR, Soviet Union
- Died: 4 March 2020 (aged 86) Tbilisi, Georgia
- Height: 1.86 m (6 ft 1 in)
- Weight: 80 kg (176 lb)

Sport
- Sport: Athletics
- Event: High jump
- Club: Dynamo Tbilisi

Achievements and titles
- Personal best: 2.17 m (1964)
Medal record
Men's athletics
Representing the Soviet Union
Olympic Games
Gold medal – first place	1960 Rome	High jump
European Championships
Bronze medal – third place	1962 Belgrade	High jump

Robert Shavlakadze (Georgian: რობერტ შავლაყაძე; Russian: Роберт Михайлович Шавлакадзе, 1 April 1933 – 4 March 2020) was a Georgian high jumper. He competed for the Soviet Union at the 1960 and 1964 Olympics and finished in first and fifth place, respectively. He also won a bronze medal at the 1962 European Championships.

Domestically Shavlakadze won only one Soviet title, in 1964, finishing second in 1959, 1960 and 1962. After retiring from competitions he worked as an athletics coach, in Georgia and Congo. From 1981 to 1993 he was professor of physical education at the Agricultural University of Georgia. Later he became member of the Georgian Olympic Committee.
