= Kjell-Åke Nilsson =

Swedish high jumper

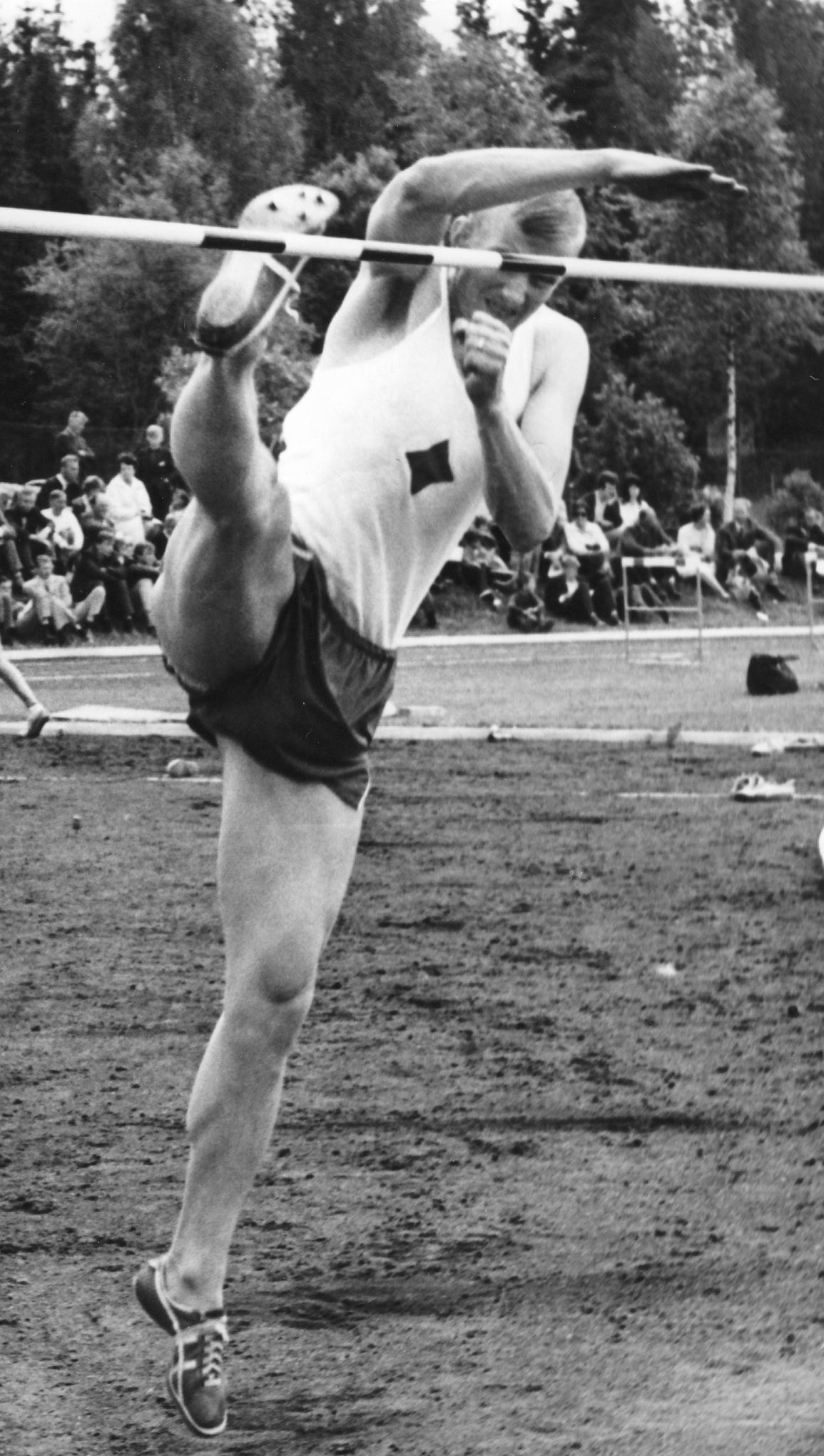

Personal information
- Born: 5 April 1942 (age 84) Östmark, Sweden
- Height: 1.90 m (6 ft 3 in)
- Weight: 82 kg (181 lb)

Sport
- Sport: Athletics
- Event: High jump
- Club: Sörmarks IF; IFK Sunne

Achievements and titles
- Personal best: 2.12 m (1963)
Medal record
Representing Sweden
European Indoor Games
Bronze medal – third place	1966 Dortmund	High jump

Kjell-Åke Lennart "Sörmarkarn" Nilsson (born 5 April 1942) is a retired Swedish high jumper. He competed at the 1960 and 1964 Summer Olympics and at the 1966 European Athletics Championships and finished in seventh, sixth and eighth place, respectively. Nilsson won a bronze medal at the 1966 European Indoor Games and became a Swedish champion outdoors in 1963 and indoors in 1966.

Nilsson won the British AAA Championships title in the high jump event at the 1965 AAA Championships.
