= Men's high jump world record progression =

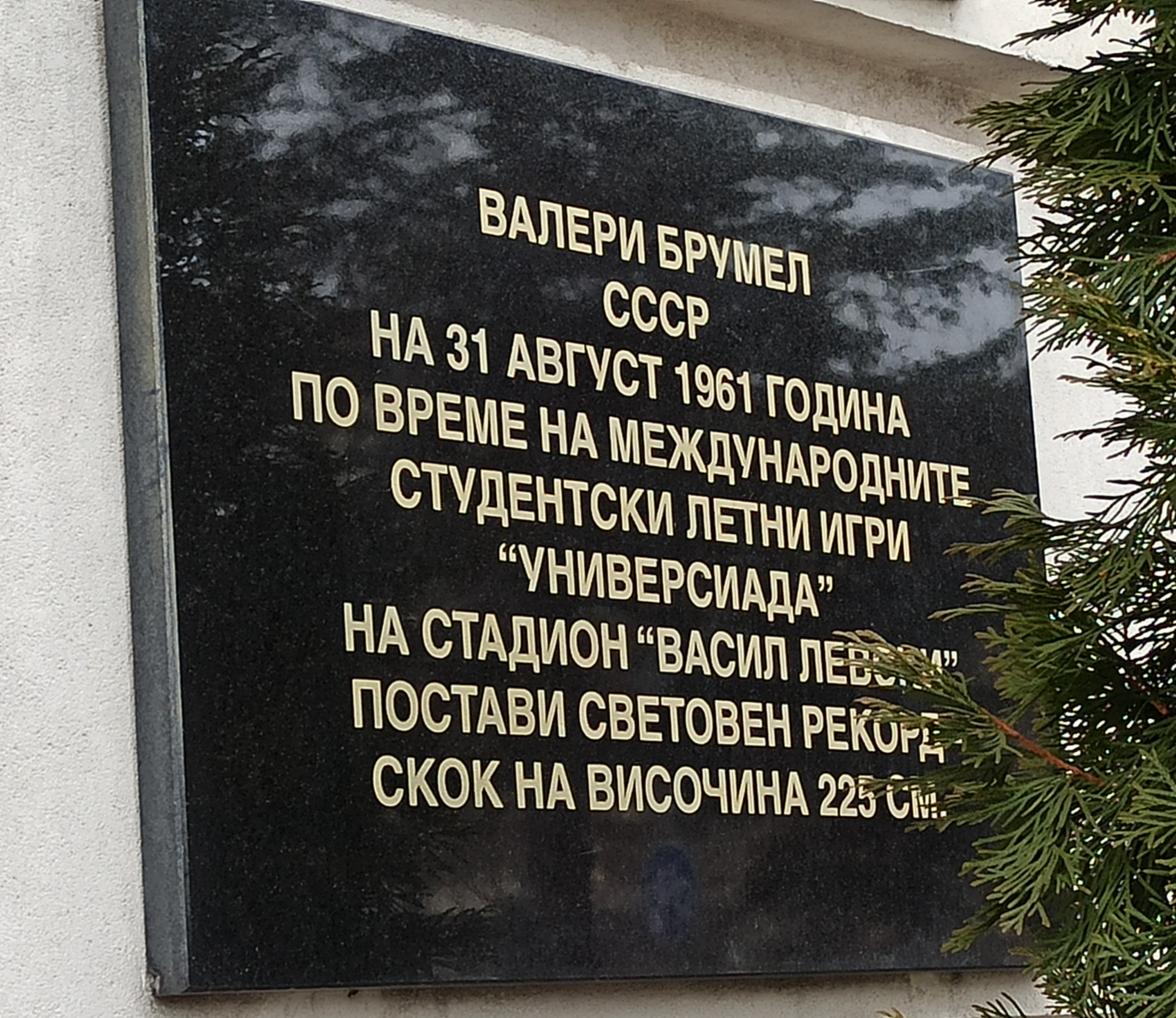
A plaque on Vasil Levski National Stadium, Sofia, Bulgaria, commemorating Valeriy Brumel's high jump world record of 2.25 m set on 31 August 1961

The first world record in the men's high jump was recognized by the International Association of Athletics Federations (IAAF) in 1912.

As of June 2009, the IAAF has ratified 40 world records in the event.

Fourteen of the 16 records from 1912 to 1960 were set in the United States and were originally measured in feet and inches; they were converted to metric before being ratified as world records. As of January 1, 1963, records were accepted as metric marks, with marks measured in feet and inches to the nearest quarter-inch and rounded down to the nearest centimetre. When measurements were taken in feet and inches the bar could be raised, for record-attempt purposes, in increments of one-quarter inch. Under the metric system, a new record must be (at least) one centimeter higher. In 1973, American Dwight Stones was the first Fosbury Flop jumper to set a world record. The namesake of the technique, Dick Fosbury impressed the world by winning the 1968 Olympics with the flop, but never held the world record. The last Straddle style jumper to hold the World Record was Vladimir Yashchenko (Soviet Union/Ukraine) in 1978; all record-setters since then have used the Flop technique.

The world record of 2.45 metres (8.04 ft) by Cuban Javier Sotomayor in 1993 has never been surpassed.

== Progression ==
Ratified
Ratified but later rescinded

=== Pre-IAAF ===
Mark	Athlete	Venue	Date
1.575 m (5 ft 2 in)	Adam Wilson (GBR)	Innerleithen	September 26, 1827
1.60 m (5 ft 2 3/4 in)	Thomas Anderson (GBR)	Innerleithen	July 24, 1829
1.60 m (5 ft 2 3/4 in)	John Pattison (GBR)	Mount Benger	May 6, 1837
1.675 m (5 ft 5 3/4 in)	Richard Armstrong (GBR)	Dalkeith	August 5, 1839
1.675 m (5 ft 5 3/4 in)	Thomas Roper (GBR)	Newcastle	April 1, 1850
1.675 m (5 ft 5 3/4 in)	Francis Temple (GBR)	Woolwich	September 21, 1850
1.675 m (5 ft 5 3/4 in)	Hanmer Webb (GBR)	Cambridge	March 17, 1857
1.675 m (5 ft 5 3/4 in)	Henry Powell (GBR)	Oxford	March 15, 1860
1.70 m (5 ft 6 3/4 in)	Robert Burton (GBR)	Harrow	March 27, 1860
1.675 m (5 ft 5 3/4 in)	Henry Sampson (GBR)	Liverpool	June 13, 1863
1.675 m (5 ft 5 3/4 in)	T. Bailey (GBR)	Liverpool	June 13, 1863
1.675 m (5 ft 5 3/4 in)	Francis Gooch (GBR)	Durham	September 2, 1863
1.70 m (5 ft 6 3/4 in)	Tom Mitchell (GBR)	Liverpool	July 9, 1864
1.725 m (5 ft 7 3/4 in)	John Roupell (GBR)	Cambridge	March 5, 1866
1.75 m (5 ft 8 3/4 in)	John Roupell (GBR)	London	March 23, 1866
1.75 m (5 ft 8 3/4 in)	Thomas Little (GBR)	London	March 23, 1866
1.75 m (5 ft 8 3/4 in)	J.A. Harwood (GBR)	London	November 26, 1866
1.75 m (5 ft 8 3/4 in)	Herbert Brooks (GBR)	London	November 26, 1866
1.75 m (5 ft 8 3/4 in)	Thomas Little (GBR)	London	April 12, 1867
1.75 m (5 ft 8 3/4 in)	Ronald Mitchell (GBR)	London	April 9, 1870
1.755 m (5 ft 9 in)	Ronald Mitchell (GBR)	London	April 3, 1871
1.785 m (5 ft 10 1/4 in)	Tom Davin (IRE)	Dublin	July 7, 1873
1.80 m (5 ft 10 3/4 in)	Marshall Brooks (GBR)	London	March 30, 1874
1.80 m (5 ft 10 3/4 in)	Michael Glazebrook (GBR)	London	March 22, 1875
1.83 m (6 ft 0 in)	Marshall Brooks (GBR)	Oxford	March 17, 1876
1.89 m (6 ft 2 1/4 in)	Marshall Brooks (GBR)	London	April 7, 1876
1.90 m (6 ft 2 3/4 in)	Patrick Davin (IRE)	Carrick	July 5, 1880
1.91 m (6 ft 3 in)	William Page (USA)	Stourbridge	August 15, 1887
1.93 m (6 ft 3 3/4 in)	William Page (USA)	Philadelphia	October 7, 1887
1.968 m (6 ft 5 1/4 in) (Note: Result sources list this mark as uncertain)	George Rowdon (GBR)	Haytor Camp	August 6, 1890
1.935 m (6 ft 4 in)	Michael Sweeney (USA)	New York City	October 8, 1892
1.945 m (6 ft 4 1/2 in)	James Ryan (IRE)	Tipperary	August 19, 1895
1.955 m (6 ft 4 3/4 in)	Michael Sweeney (USA)	New York City	August 28, 1895
1.955 m (6 ft 4 3/4 in)	Michael Sweeney (USA)	Bayonne	September 2, 1895
1.97 m (6 ft 5 1/2 in)	Michael Sweeney (USA)	New York City	September 21, 1895
1.98 m (6 ft 5 3/4 in)	George Horine (USA)	Palo Alto	March 29, 1912
6 ft 6 in (1.98 m) (Note: Measured as 6 feet 6 and 1/8th inches, but World Athletics rules round down to the nearest quarter inch.)	George Horine (USA)	United States	April/May 1912

=== Post-IAAF ===
Mark	Athlete	Venue	Date
2.00 m (6 ft 6 1/2 in)	George Horine (USA)	Palo Alto, California	18 May 1912
2.01 m (6 ft 7 in)	Edward Beeson (USA)	Berkeley, California	2 May 1914
2.03 m (6 ft 7 3/4 in)	Harold Osborn (USA)	Urbana, Illinois	27 May 1924
2.04 m (6 ft 8 1/4 in)	Walter Marty (USA)	Fresno, California	13 May 1933
2.06 m (6 ft 9 in)	Walter Marty (USA)	Palo Alto, California	28 April 1934
2.07 m (6 ft 9 1/4 in)	Cornelius Johnson (USA)	New York	12 July 1936
2.07 m (6 ft 9 1/4 in)	Dave Albritton (USA)	New York	12 July 1936
2.09 m (6 ft 10 1/4 in)	Mel Walker (USA)	Malmö, Sweden	12 August 1937
2.11 m (6 ft 11 in)	Lester Steers (USA)	Los Angeles	17 June 1941
2.12 m (6 ft 11 1/4 in)	Walt Davis (USA)	Dayton, Ohio	27 June 1953
2.15 m (7 ft 1/2 in)	Charles Dumas (USA)	Los Angeles	29 June 1956
2.16 m (7 ft 1 in)	Yuriy Stepanov (URS)	Leningrad, Soviet Union	13 July 1957
2.17 m (7 ft 1 1/4 in)	John Thomas (USA)	Philadelphia	30 April 1960
2.17 m (7 ft 1 1/4 in)	John Thomas (USA)	Cambridge, Massachusetts	21 May 1960
2.18 m (7 ft 1 3/4 in)	John Thomas (USA)	Bakersfield, California	24 June 1960
2.22 m (7 ft 3 1/4 in)	John Thomas (USA)	Palo Alto, California	1 July 1960
2.23 m (7 ft 3 3/4 in)	Valeriy Brumel (URS)	Moscow	18 June 1961
2.24 m (7 ft 4 in)	Valeriy Brumel (URS)	Moscow	16 July 1961
2.25 m (7 ft 4 1/2 in)	Valeriy Brumel (URS)	Sofia, Bulgaria	31 August 1961
2.26 m (7 ft 4 3/4 in)	Valeriy Brumel (URS)	Palo Alto, California	22 July 1962
2.27 m (7 ft 5 1/4 in)	Valeriy Brumel (URS)	Moscow	29 September 1962
2.28 m (7 ft 5 3/4 in)	Valeriy Brumel (URS)	Moscow	21 July 1963
2.29 m (7 ft 6 in)	Pat Matzdorf (USA)	Berkeley, California	3 July 1971
2.30 m (7 ft 6 1/2 in)	Dwight Stones (USA)	Munich	11 July 1973
2.31 m (7 ft 6 3/4 in)	Dwight Stones (USA)	Philadelphia	5 June 1976
2.32 m (7 ft 7 1/4 in)	Dwight Stones (USA)	Philadelphia	4 August 1976
2.33 m (7 ft 7 1/2 in)	Vladimir Yashchenko (URS)	Richmond, Virginia	2 June 1977
2.34 m (7 ft 8 in)	Vladimir Yashchenko (URS)	Tbilisi, Soviet Union	16 June 1978
2.35 m (7 ft 8 1/2 in)	Jacek Wszoła (POL)	Eberstadt, West Germany	25 May 1980
2.35 m (7 ft 8 1/2 in)	Dietmar Mögenburg (FRG)	Rehlingen, West Germany	26 May 1980
2.36 m (7 ft 8 3/4 in)	Gerd Wessig (GDR)	Moscow, Soviet Union	1 August 1980
2.37 m (7 ft 9 1/4 in)	Zhu Jianhua (CHN)	Beijing, China	11 June 1983
2.38 m (7 ft 9 1/2 in)	Zhu Jianhua (CHN)	Shanghai, China	22 September 1983
2.39 m (7 ft 10 in)	Zhu Jianhua (CHN)	Eberstadt, West Germany	10 June 1984
2.40 m (7 ft 10 1/4 in)	Rudolf Povarnitsyn (URS)	Donetsk, Soviet Union	11 August 1985
2.41 m (7 ft 10 3/4 in)	Igor Paklin (URS)	Kobe, Japan	4 September 1985
2.42 m (7 ft 11 1/4 in)	Patrik Sjöberg (SWE)	Stockholm, Sweden	30 June 1987
2.42 m (7 ft 11 1/4 in) i	Carlo Thränhardt (FRG)	West Berlin	26 February 1988 (Note: This indoor record was also accepted as a world record. However, in 1991 it was rescinded as a world record due to complaints that the flexible parquet flooring gave athletes an unfair advantage.)
2.43 m (7 ft 11 1/2 in)	Javier Sotomayor (CUB)	Salamanca, Spain	8 September 1988
2.44 m (8 ft 0 in)	Javier Sotomayor (CUB)	San Juan, Puerto Rico	29 July 1989
2.45 m (8 ft 1/4 in)	Javier Sotomayor (CUB)	Salamanca, Spain	27 July 1993

== See also ==
- Women's high jump world record progression
- Men's high jump Italian record progression
