= George Horine =

American high jumper (1890–1948)

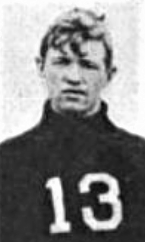
- Horine during his collegiate years, circa 1912 wearing his 1913 class sweater

Personal information
- Full name: George Leslie Horine
- Born: February 3, 1890 Escondido, California, U.S.
- Died: November 28, 1948 (aged 58) Merced, California, U.S.
- Height: 1.80 m (5 ft 11 in)
- Weight: 73 kg (161 lb)
- Spouse: Annamay Van Thiel (1915)
- Children: 3

Sport
- Sport: Track and field
- Event: High jump
- College team: Stanford University
- Club: Olympic Club
- Coached by: Edward Moulton (Stanford)

Achievements and titles
- Personal best: High jump: 6'7" / 2.007m (1912)
Medal record
Representing the United States
Olympic Games
Bronze medal – third place	1912 Stockholm	High jump

George Leslie Horine (February 3, 1890 – November 28, 1948) was an American athlete who specialized in the high jump, and competed for Stanford University. He is credited with developing a new and revolutionary jumping technique now known as the Western roll. In the Western roll, the bar is approached at an angle, with the jumper beginning the jump with the inside leg, and then rolling sideways with the body going over the bar, basically parallel to the bar. Using his method, Horine won a bronze medal in the high jump at the 1912 Summer Olympics with a new world record of 1.89 meters. The more traditional method of performing the high jump at the time was the scissors jump method, which used a scissoring motion of the legs to go over the bar while usually bending from the waist, which allowed high jumpers to more easily land on their feet.

He later had a lengthy career as a fruit farmer, specializing in peaches, from around 1916 through 1945.

== Early life ==
Horine was born in Escondido, California, outside San Diego, on February 3, 1890. Horine attended Santa Ana High School in greater Los Angeles, California where he acted in the school play, "College Days" in his Senior year, graduating in June of 1907. He took an early interest in horticulture by the age of 15, when his hometown paper, the Santa Ana Register, published an article he had written about the growing, harvesting, and drying of apricots. Accepted to Stanford by his Senior year, he had originally planned to study electrical engineering.

== Stanford University ==
Horine attended and competed for Stanford University from around 1909 to 1913. There he was coached by Edward Moulton, a former sprinter, and coach for the University of Minnesota and University of Wisconsin. While on the track team at Stanford, Horine's technique was corrected from his western roll technique to the more conventional scissors jumping style of the time. He equaled the National Collegiate Athletic Association (NCAA) record in the high jump event at 6' 4" as a sophomore. In his junior year, 1912, he reverted to his old style of the sideways jump or Western roll, improving to 6' 4 3/4" and then set a world record of 6' 6 1/8". As expected, Horine held the Stanford record for the high jump during his collegiate years.

== 1912 Olympics ==
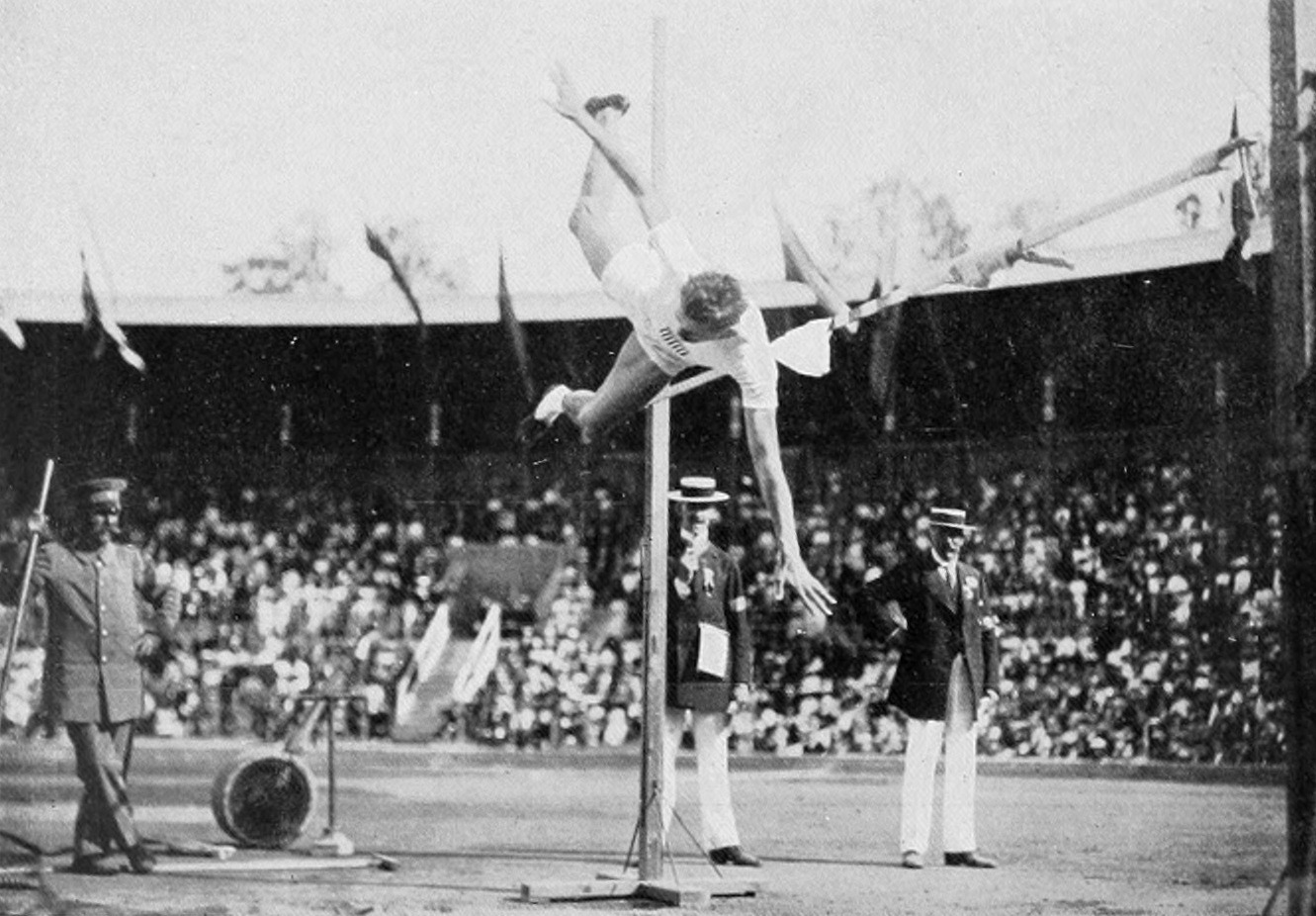
Horine clearing the bar on his side at the Stockholm Olympics

At the Olympic trials, he improved his high jump personal best to 6' 7", an official time, making him the first man to break the 2 metres (6 ft 6.7 in) barrier. It was the first high jump world record ratified by the International Association of Athletics Federations (IAAF). He never improved upon his record, which stood for two years.

After graduating from Stanford, Horine trained and competed with the Olympic Club in San Francisco where he would serve as team Captain.

Horine competed for the United States at the 1912 Summer Olympics held in Stockholm, where he won the bronze medal in the men's high jump event with a final jump of 1.89 meters, a new world record, using his own Western roll technique where he cleared the bar on his side, as shown at left. Alma Richards of the U.S. took the gold with a jump of 1.93 meters, and Hans Liesche of Germany took the silver with a jump of 1.91 meters or 6 feet 7 inches in imperial measurement.

Horin also competed for the USA in an exhibition baseball tournament in Stockholm.

== Later life ==
Horine married Annamay Van Thiel on March 6, 1915, in San Rafael, California. Annamay was a registered Nurse who had cared for George while he was being treated at the Peninsula Hospital. They initially planned to live in Alameda, California.

In his early career, Horine worked long hours driving a truck for Wells Fargo prior to his enrolling at Stanford. He left competitive track in 1916, and became a fruit farmer, primarily a grower and packer of peaches. He continued to work as a fruit farmer for the next 30 years through his retirement around 1945.

After a lengthy illness, Horine died at the age of 58 at his fruit farm in Merced, California on November 28, 1948. Many sources attributed his death to a heart attack. Funeral services were held at the Ivers and Alcorn Mission Chapel on December 1, and he was buried at the Winton Cemetery at the family's plot. He was survived by his widow Annamay Van Thiel Horine who would later be buried by his side in 1986, one daughter, two sons, and a grandchild.

== See also ==
- Men's high jump world record progression

Records
Preceded by (United States) Michael Sweeney	Men's High Jump World Record Holder; May 18, 1912 – May 2, 1914	Succeeded by (United States) Edward Beeson
