= Eastern cut-off =

High jump technique

The eastern cut-off is a variant of the "scissors" high jump style involving a layout. This enables the jumper to clear a higher bar than with the traditional scissors style while still landing on the feet. The technique is generally credited to Michael Sweeney of the New York Athletic Club, who used it in 1895 to set a world record of 6 ft 5 5/8 inches (1.97 m). The style came to be called "eastern" because of its origin on the US east coast, after the invention of the rival "western roll" style by George Horine on the west coast (Stanford). Horine was in fact the first to improve on Sweeney's record, when he cleared 6 ft 7 inches (2.01 m) in 1912.

Although succeeded by the more efficient layout techniques of the western roll and (in the 1930s) by the straddle, the eastern cut-off continued to be competitive at an international level until the 1940s in the men's high jump, and until the 1960s in the women's high jump. It was used by John Winter of Australia to win the high jump in the 1948 Olympics, and by Iolanda Balas of Romania to win the women's high jump in the 1960 and 1964 Olympics. Even today, the eastern cut-off is used by high school jumpers in Kenya, where the lack of foam landing mats necessitates a style where jumpers land on their feet.

The eastern cut-off involves contrary rotations of the body and legs. A jumper taking off from the left foot crosses the bar with the right leg first, left leg roughly parallel to the bar, with the body still on the takeoff side and twisted (opposite to the rotation of the left leg) to face downwards. After crossing the bar the legs are rapidly "scissored", undoing the twist and allowing the jumper to land on their takeoff foot facing the bar.
