= Fosbury flop =

High jump technique

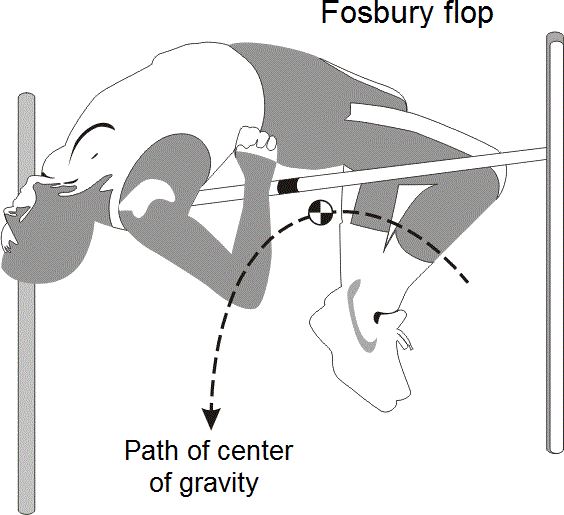
it is theoretically possible for the center of gravity to stay under the bar.

The Fosbury flop is a jumping style used in the track and field event of high jump. It was popularized and perfected by American athlete Dick Fosbury, whose gold medal in the 1968 Summer Olympics in Mexico City brought it to the world's attention. The flop became the dominant style of the event, surpassing the straddle technique, Western roll, Eastern cut-off, or scissors jump to clear the bar. Though the backwards flop technique had been known for years before Fosbury, landing surfaces had been sandpits or low piles of matting and high jumpers had to land on their feet or at least land carefully to prevent injury. With the advent of deep foam matting, high jumpers were able to be more adventurous in their landing styles and hence more experimental with jumping styles.

== Technique ==
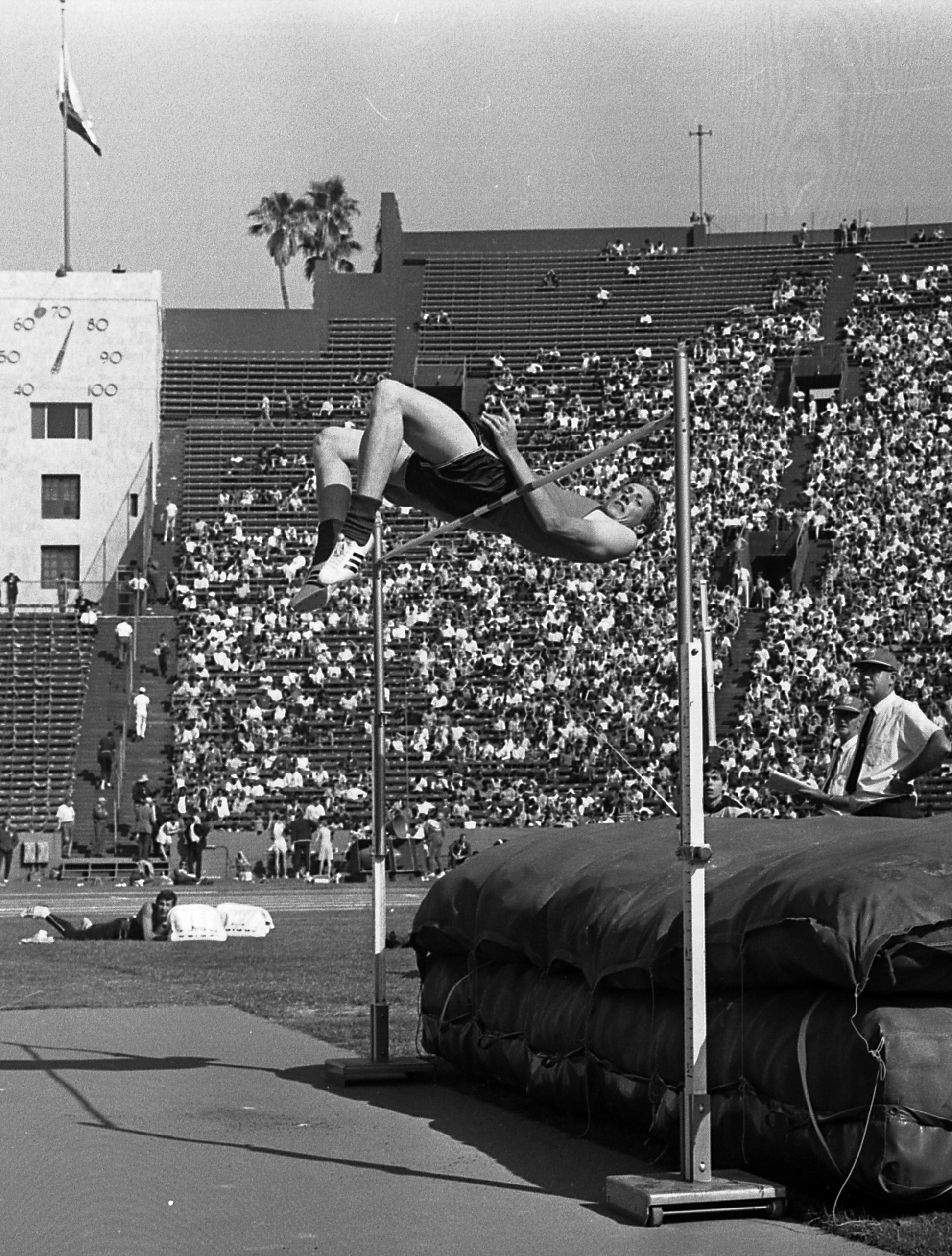
Fosbury using his technique at the 1968 Olympic trials

The approach (or run-up) in the Fosbury flop is characterized by (at least) the final four or five steps being run in a curve, allowing the athlete to lean in to the turn, away from the bar. This allows the center of gravity to be lowered even before knee flexion, giving a longer time period for the take-off thrust. Additionally, on take-off, the sudden move from inward lean to outwards produces a rotation of the jumper's body along the bar's axis, aiding clearance.

Combined with the rotation around the jumper's vertical axis (center around the waist, which rotates) produced by the drive leg (similar to an ice skater spinning around on one spot), the resulting body position on bar clearance is laid out supine with the body at ninety degrees to the bar with the head and shoulders crossing the bar before the trunk and legs. This gives the Flop its characteristic "backward over the bar" appearance, with the athlete landing on the mat on their shoulders and back.

While in flight, the athlete can progressively arch shoulders, back, and legs in a rolling motion, keeping as much of the body as possible below the bar. It is theoretically possible for the center of mass to pass under the bar.

While the straddle style required strength in the takeoff knee and could be used by relatively burly athletes (e g. Valeriy Brumel), the flop allowed athletes of a slender build to use their co-ordination to greater effect and minimize the risk knee injuries more prevalent in other styles.

Predominantly, athletes using the flop use a J shaped approach, where the first three-to-five strides head in a straight line at ninety degrees to the bar, with the final four-to-five being run in a curve (noted above).

Fosbury himself cleared the bar with his hands by his sides, whereas some athletes cross the bar with their arms held out to the side or even above their heads, optimizing their mass-distribution. Studies show that variations in approach, arm technique, and other factors can be adjusted to achieve each athlete's best performance.

The flop's optimal speed of approach is not a full-out sprint. Similarly, increasing the number of strides beyond eight or ten is not recommended unless the athlete has achieved high consistency in the approach and can handle the increased speed. The angle of take-off towards the bar is usually somewhere between fifteen and thirty degrees. The angle must not be too shallow, or the jumper jumps too far along the bar, landing on it. If the angle is too wide, there is not enough time to "layout" in the air.

The "broken" leg (which is thrust into the air first at take-off) is always the nearer leg to the bar. Thus someone who uses a left foot take-off (where the left foot transmits the jump force and is the latter to leave the ground) will approach the bar from its right-hand side, curving to their left to approach their right shoulder. The right leg will drive into the air, and the jumper's body rotates anti-clockwise around the vertical axis to present their back to the bar in flight.

As well as driving the leg and hips at take-off, the athlete should drive or even swing one or both arms into the air, contributing to the upwards momentum.

== See also ==
- Debbie Brill, the "Brill Bend"
