= High jump =

Track and field event

Athletics High jump
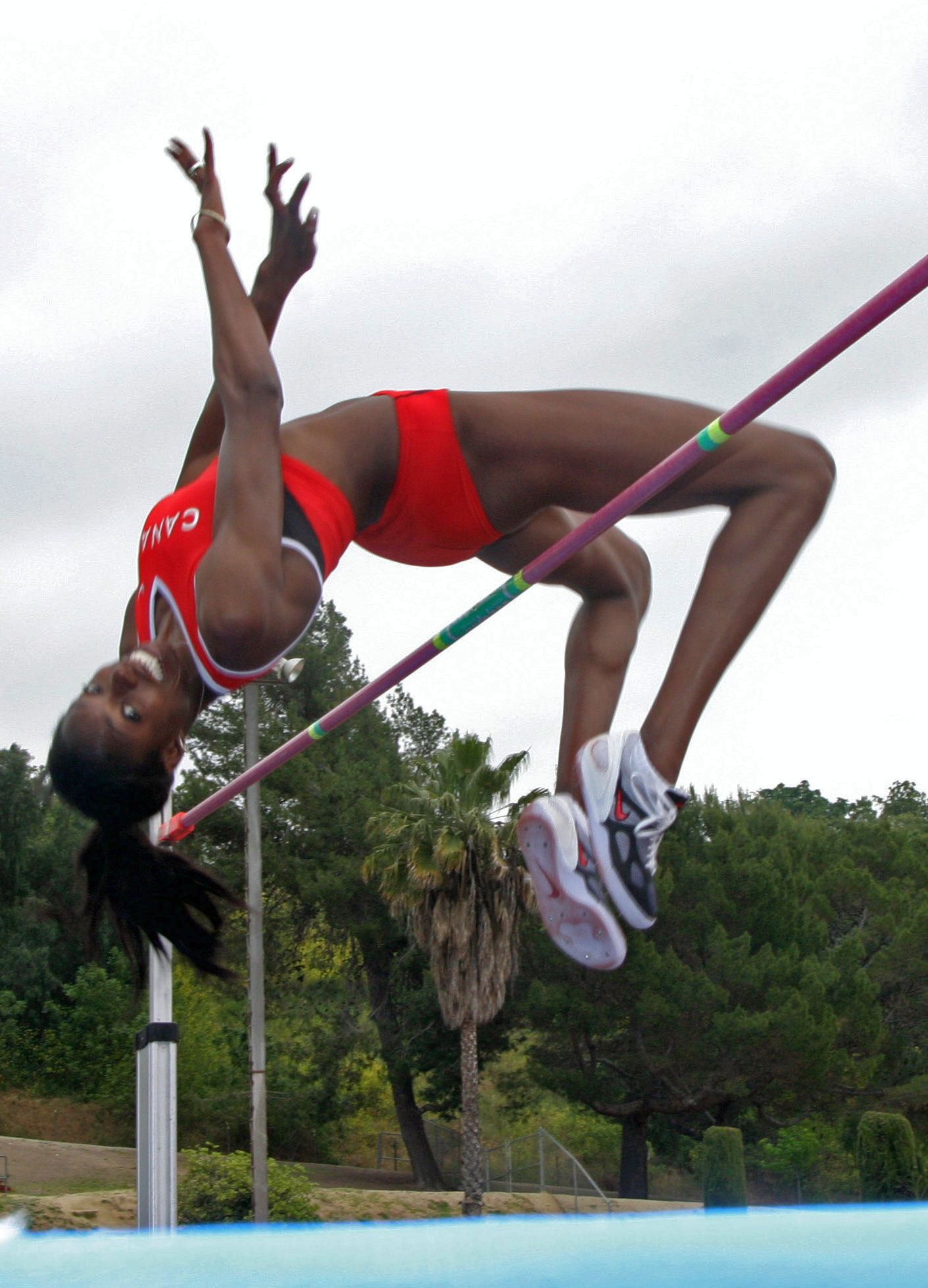
- Canadian high jumper Nicole Forrester demonstrating the Fosbury flop

World records
- Men: (Cuba) Javier Sotomayor 2.45 m (8 ft 1/4 in) (1993)
- Women: (Ukraine) Yaroslava Mahuchikh 2.10 m (6 ft 10 1/2 in) (2024)

Olympic records
- Men: (United States) Charles Austin 2.39 m (7 ft 10 in) (1996)
- Women: (Russia) Yelena Slesarenko 2.06 m (6 ft 9 in) (2004)

World Championship records
- Men: (Ukraine) Bohdan Bondarenko 2.41 m (7 ft 10 3/4 in) (2013)
- Women: (Bulgaria) Stefka Kostadinova 2.09 m (6 ft 10 1/4 in) (1987)

The high jump is a track and field event in which competitors must jump unaided over a horizontal bar placed at measured heights without dislodging it. In its modern, most-practiced format, a bar is placed between two standards with a crash mat for landing. Since ancient times, competitors have successively improved their technique, today employing the universally preferred Fosbury flop, in which athletes run towards the bar and leap head first with their back to the bar.

The discipline is, alongside the pole vault, one of two vertical clearance events in the Olympic athletics program. It is contested at the World Championships in Athletics and the World Athletics Indoor Championships, and is a common occurrence at track and field meets. The high jump was among the first events deemed acceptable for women, having been held at the 1928 Olympic Games.

Javier Sotomayor (Cuba) is the world record holder with a jump of 2.45 m (8 ft 1/4 in) set in 1993 – the longest-standing record in the history of the men's high jump. Yaroslava Mahuchikh (Ukraine) is the women's world record holder with a jump of 2.10 m (6 ft 10 1/2 in) set in 2024.

== Rules ==
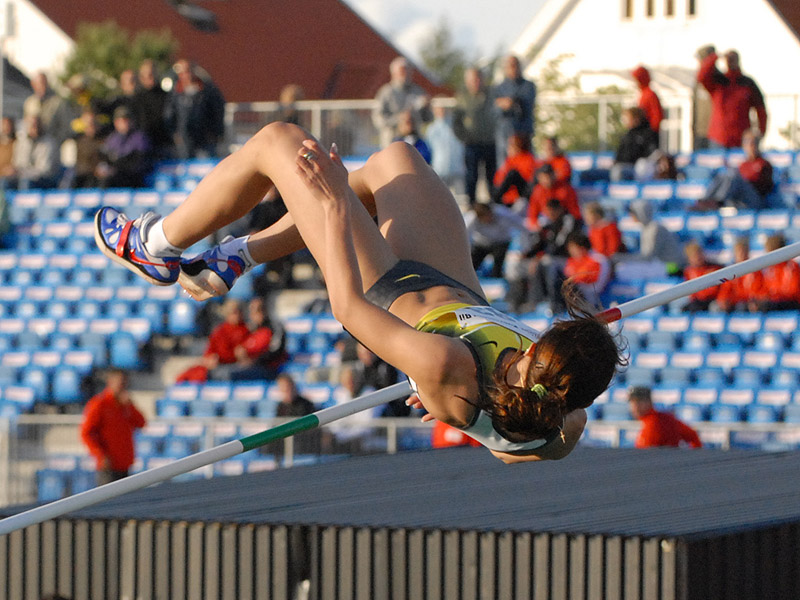
Yelena Slesarenko hitting the bar while using the Fosbury Flop technique

The rules set for the high jump by World Athletics (previously named the IAAF) are Technical Rules TR2600 and TR2007 (previously Rules 1801 and 1802). Jumpers must take off from one foot. A jump is considered a failure if the jumper dislodges the bar or touches the ground or any object behind the bar before clearance.

Competitors may begin jumping at any height announced by the chief judge, or may pass at their own discretion. Most competitions state that three consecutive missed jumps, at any height or combination of heights, will eliminate the jumper from contention. The victory goes to the jumper who clears the greatest height during the final.

=== Tie breaking ===
If two or more jumpers tie for any place, the tie-breakers are: 1) the fewest misses at the height at which the tie occurred; and 2) the fewest misses throughout the competition. If the event remains tied for first place (or a limited-advancement position to a subsequent meet), the jumpers have a jump-off, beginning at the next height above their highest success. Jumpers have one attempt at each height. If only one succeeds, he or she wins; if more than one does, these try with the bar raised; if none does, all try with the bar lowered. This process was followed at the 2015 World Championship men's event and at the 2024 Summer Olympics.

Example:

Example jump-off
Competitor	Main competition							Jump-off			Place
Competitor	1.75m	1.80m	1.84m	1.88m	1.91m	1.94m	1.97m	1.91m	1.89m	1.91m	Place
A	o	xo	o	xo	x	–	xx	x	o	x	2
B	–	xo	–	xo	–	–	xxx	x	o	o	1
C	–	o	xo	xo	–	xxx		x	x		3
D	–	xo	xo	xo	xxx						4

In the example jump-off, the final cleared height is 1.88m, at which A B C and D each have one failure. D has two failures at lower heights compared to one each for the other three, who proceed to a jump-off at the next height above the final cleared height. C is eliminated in the second round of the jump-off 1.89m, then B wins in the third round.

A 2009 rule-change makes the jump-off optional, so that first place can be shared by agreement among tied athletes. This rule led to shared gold in the 2020 Olympic men's event held in 2021.

== History ==
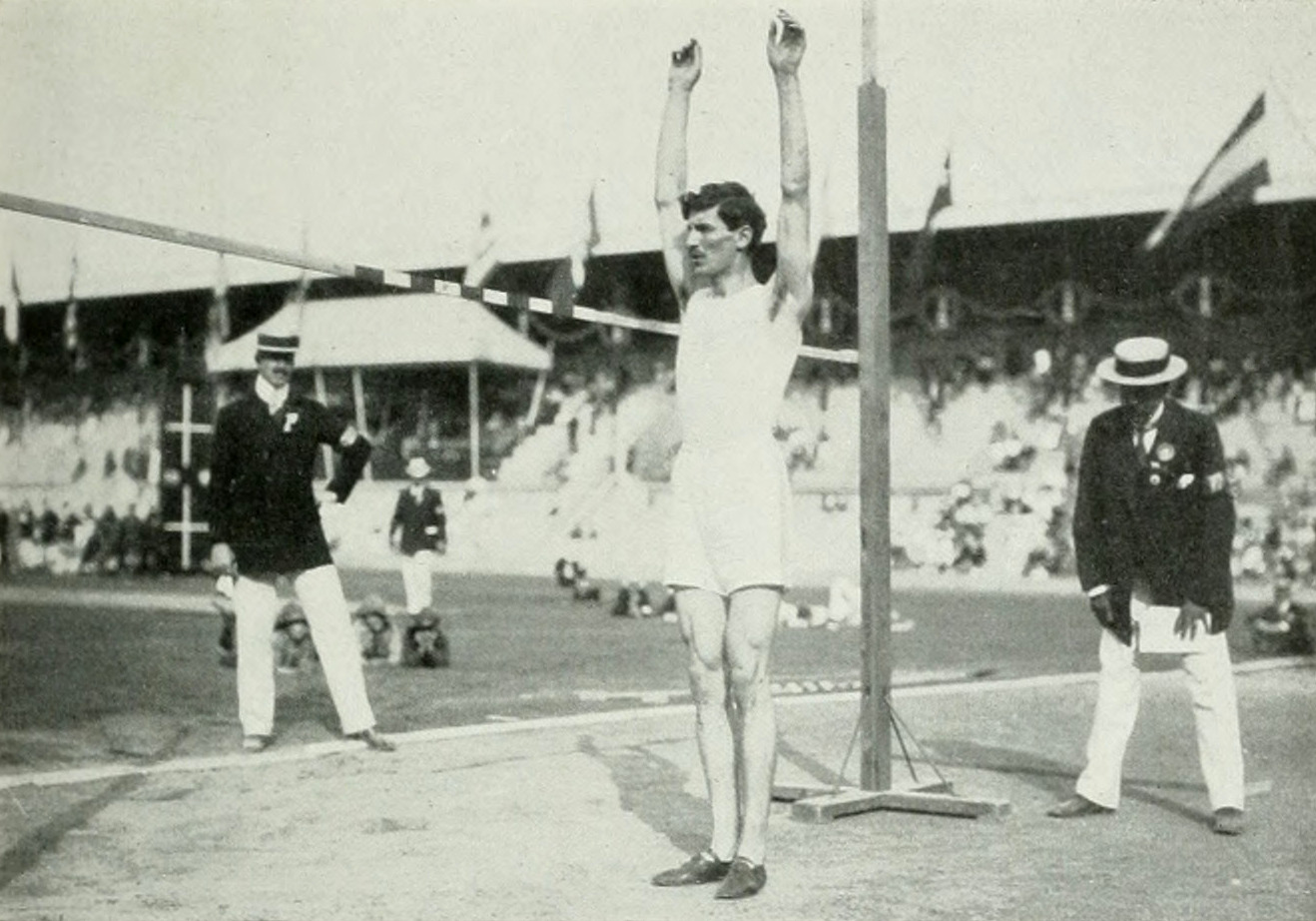
Konstantinos Tsiklitiras during the standing high jump competition at the 1912 Summer Olympics

The first recorded high jump event took place in Scotland in the 19th century. Early jumpers used either an elaborate straight-on approach or a scissors technique. In later years, the bar was approached diagonally, and the jumper threw first the inside leg and then the other over the bar in a scissoring motion.

Around the turn of the 20th century, techniques began to change, beginning with the Irish-American Michael Sweeney's Eastern cut-off as a variation of the scissors technique. By taking off as in the scissors method, extending his spine and flattening out over the bar, Sweeney raised the world record to 1.97 m (6 ft 5 1/2 in) in 1895. Even in 1948, John Winter of Australia won the gold medal of the 1948 London Olympics with this style. Besides, one of the most successful female high jumpers, Iolanda Balaș of Romania, used this style to dominate women's high jump for about 10 years until her retirement in 1967.

Another American, George Horine, developed an even more efficient technique, the Western roll. In this style, the bar again is approached on a diagonal, but the inner leg is used for the take-off, while the outer leg is thrust up to lead the body sideways over the bar. Horine increased the world standard to 2.01 m (6 ft 7 in) in 1912. His technique was predominant through the 1936 Berlin Olympics, in which the event was won by Cornelius Johnson at 2.03 m (6 ft 7 3/4 in).

American and Soviet jumpers were the most successful for the next four decades, and they pioneered the straddle technique. Straddle jumpers took off as in the Western roll but rotated their torso, belly-down, around the bar, obtaining the most efficient and highest clearance up to that time. Straddle jumper Charles Dumas was the first to clear 7 feet (2.13 m), in 1956. American John Thomas pushed the world mark to 2.23 m (7 ft 3 3/4 in) in 1960. Valeriy Brumel of the Soviet Union took over the event for the next four years, radically speeding up his approach run. He took the record up to 2.28 m (7 ft 5 3/4 in) and won the gold medal of the 1964 Tokyo Olympics, before a motorcycle accident in 1965 ended his career.

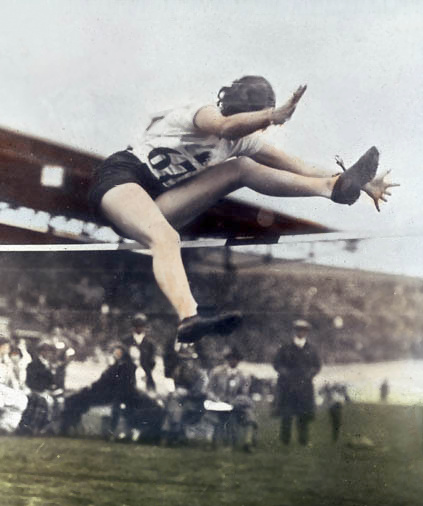
Gold medal winner Ethel Catherwood of Canada scissors over the bar at the 1928 Summer Olympics. Her winning result was 1.59 m (5 ft 2 1/2 in).

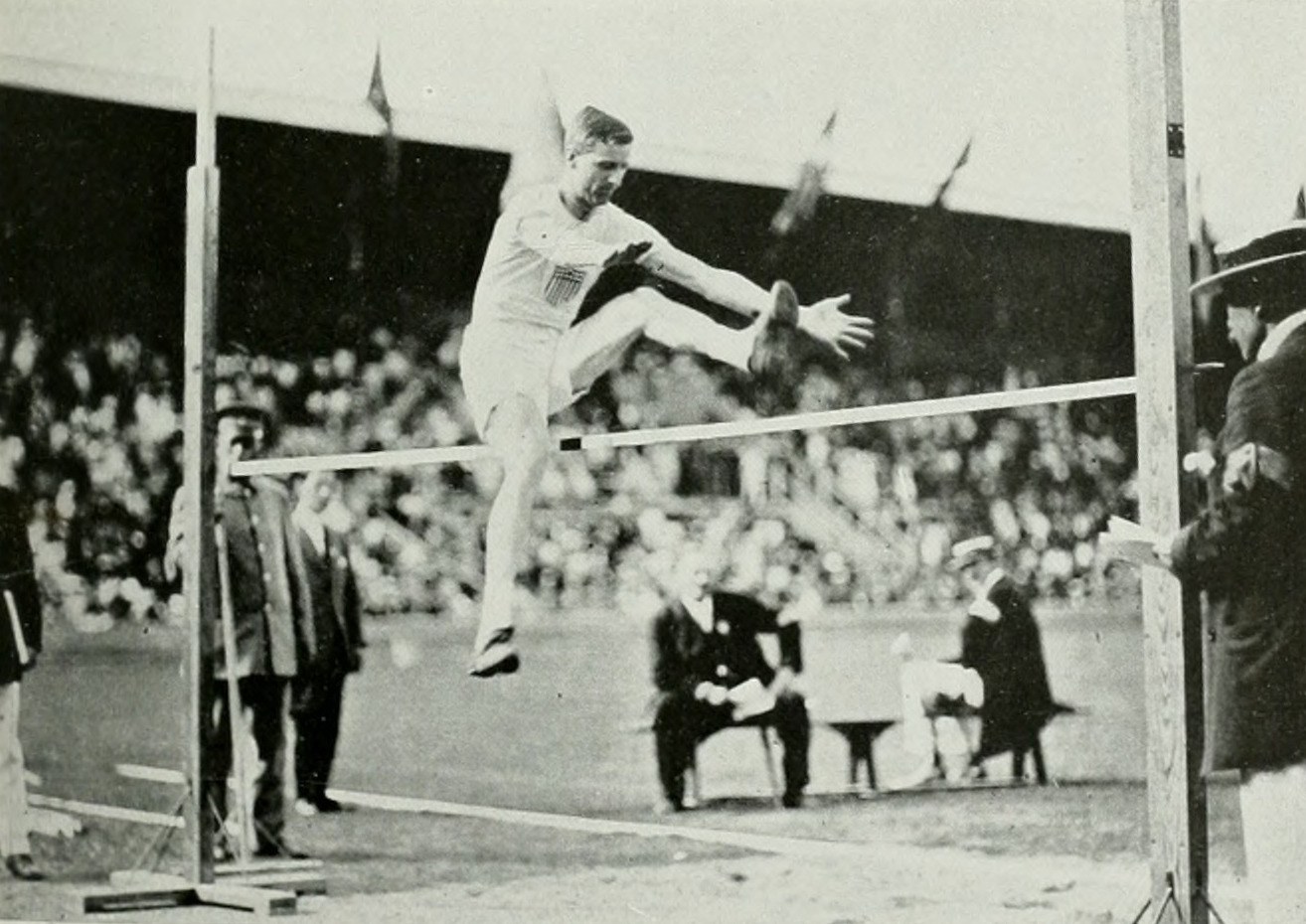
Platt Adams during the standing high jump competition at the 1912 Summer Olympics

Coaches from the United States, such as a two-time NCAA champion Frank Costello of the University of Maryland, traveled to Russia to learn from Brumel and his coaches like Vladimir Dyachkov. However, a solitary innovator at Oregon State University, Dick Fosbury, brought back the high jump into the next century.

Taking advantage of the raised, softer, artificially-cushioned landing areas that were in use by then, Fosbury added a new twist to the outmoded Eastern cut-off. He directed himself over the bar head and shoulders first, going over on his back and landing in a fashion that would likely have resulted in serious injury in the old ground-level landing pits, which were usually filled with sawdust or sand mixtures. Around the same time, Debbie Brill independently came up with the same technique, which she called the 'Brill Bend'.

Since Fosbury used his new style, called the Fosbury flop, to win the gold medal of the 1968 Mexico Olympics, its use spread quickly, and soon "floppers" were dominating international high jump competitions. The first flopper setting a world record was the American Dwight Stones, who cleared 2.30 m (7 ft 6 1/2 in) in 1973. In the female side, the 16-year-old flopper Ulrike Meyfarth from West Germany won the gold medal of the 1972 Munich Olympics at 1.92 m (6 ft 3 1/2 in), which tied the women's world record at that time (held by the Austrian straddler Ilona Gusenbauer a year before). However, it was not until 1978 when a flopper, Sara Simeoni of Italy, broke the women's world record.

Successful high jumpers following Fosbury's lead also included the rival of Dwight Stones, 1.73 metres (5 ft 8 in)-tall Franklin Jacobs of Paterson, New Jersey, who cleared 2.32 m (7 ft 7 1/4 in), 0.59 metres (1 ft 11 in) over his head (a feat equalled 27 years later by Stefan Holm of Sweden); Chinese record-setters Ni-chi Chin and Zhu Jianhua; Germans Gerd Wessig and Dietmar Mögenburg; Swedish Olympic medalist and former world record holder Patrik Sjöberg; female jumpers Ulrike Meyfarth of West Germany and Sara Simeoni of Italy.

In spite of this, the straddle technique did not disappear at once. In 1977, the 18-year-old Soviet straddler Vladimir Yashchenko set a new world record 2.33 m (7 ft 7 1/2 in). In 1978, he raised the record to 2.34 m (7 ft 8 in), and 2.35 m (7 ft 8 1/2 in) indoor, just before a knee injury effectively ended his career when he was only 20 years old. In the female side, the straddler Rosemarie Ackermann of East Germany, who was the first female jumper ever to clear 2 m (6 ft 6 1/2 in), raised the world record from 1.95 m (6 ft 4 3/4 in) to 2.00 m (6 ft 6 1/2 in) during 1974 to 1977. In fact, from 2 June 1977 to 3 August 1978, almost 10 years after Fosbury's success, the men's and women's world records were still held by straddle jumpers Yashchenko and Ackermann respectively. However, they were the last world record holders using the straddle technique. Ackermann also won the gold medal of the 1976 Montreal Olympics, which was the last time for a straddle jumper (male or female) to win an Olympic medal.

In 1980, the Polish flopper, 1976 Olympic gold medalist Jacek Wszoła, broke Yashchenko's world record at 2.35 m (7 ft 8 1/2 in). Two years before, the female Italian flopper Sara Simeoni, the long-term rival of Ackermann, broke Ackermann's world record at 2.01 m (6 ft 7 in) and became the first female flopper to break the women's world record. She also won the gold medal of the 1980 Moscow Olympics, where Ackermann placed fourth. Since then, the flop style has been completely dominant. All other techniques were almost extinct in serious high jump competitions after late 1980s.

== Technical aspects ==
Technique and form have evolved greatly over the history of high jump. The Fosbury Flop is considered the most efficient way for competitors to propel themselves over the bar.

=== Approach ===
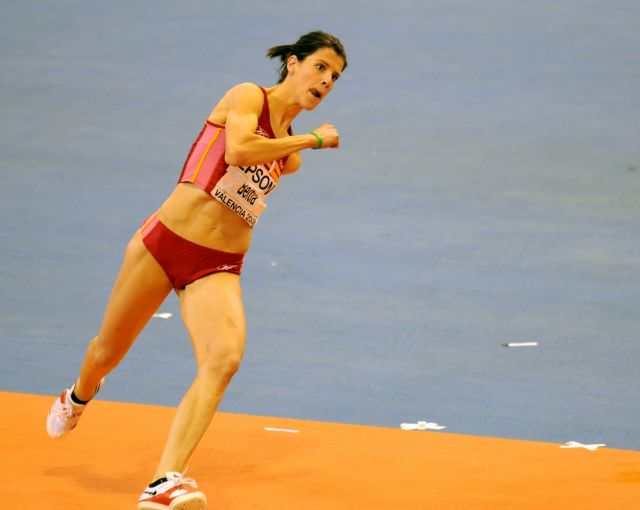
Spanish jumper Ruth Beitia approaching the bar from an angle

For a Fosbury Flop, depending on the athlete's jump foot, they start on the right or left of the high jump mat, placing their jump foot farthest away from the mat. They take an eight- to ten-step approach, with the first three to five steps being in a straight line and the last five being on a curve. The approach angle is critical for optimal height. Athletes generally mark their approach in order to find as much consistency as possible.

The straight run builds the momentum and sets the tone for a jump. The athlete starts by pushing off their takeoff foot with slow, powerful steps, then begins to accelerate. They should be running upright by the end of the straight portion.

The athlete's takeoff foot will be landing on the first step of the curve, and they will continue to accelerate, focusing their body towards the opposite back corner of the high jump mat. While staying erect and leaning away from the mat, the athlete takes their final two steps flat-footed, rolling from the heel to the toe.

Most great straddle jumpers run at angles of about 30 to 40 degrees. The length of the run is determined by the speed of the approach. A slower run requires about eight strides, but a faster high jumper might need about 13 strides. Greater speed allows a greater part of the body's forward momentum to be converted upward.

The J approach favored by Fosbury floppers allows for speed, the ability to turn in the air (centripetal force), and a good takeoff position, which helps turn horizontal momentum into vertical momentum. The approach should be a hard, controlled stride so that the athlete does not fall from running at an angle. Athletes should lean into the curve from their ankles, not their hips. This allows their hips to rotate during takeoff, which in turn allows their center of gravity to pass under the bar.

=== Takeoff ===
The takeoff can be double-arm or single-arm. In both cases, the plant foot should be the foot farthest from the bar, angled towards the opposite back corner of the mat, as they drive up the knee on their non-takeoff leg. This is accompanied by a one- or two-arm swing while driving the knee.

Unlike the straddle technique, where the takeoff foot is "planted" in the same spot regardless of the height of the bar, flop-style jumpers must adjust their approach run as the bar is raised so that their takeoff spot is slightly farther out from the bar. Jumpers attempting to reach record heights commonly fail when most of their energy is directed into the vertical effort and they knock the bar off the standards with the backs of their legs as they stall.

An effective approach shape can be derived from physics. For example, the rate of backward spin required as the jumper crosses the bar in order to facilitate shoulder clearance on the way up and foot clearance on the way down can be determined by computer simulation. This rotation rate can be back-calculated to determine the required angle of lean away from the bar at the moment of planting, based on how long the jumper is on the takeoff foot. This information, together with the jumper's speed, can be used to calculate the radius of the curved part of the approach. One can also work in the opposite direction by assuming a certain approach radius and determining the resulting backward rotation.

Drills can be practiced to solidify the approach. One drill is to run in a straight line and then run two to three circles spiraling into one another. Another is to run or skip a circle of any size two or three times in a row. It is important to leap upwards without first leaning into the bar, allowing the momentum of the J approach to carry the body across the bar.

=== Flight ===
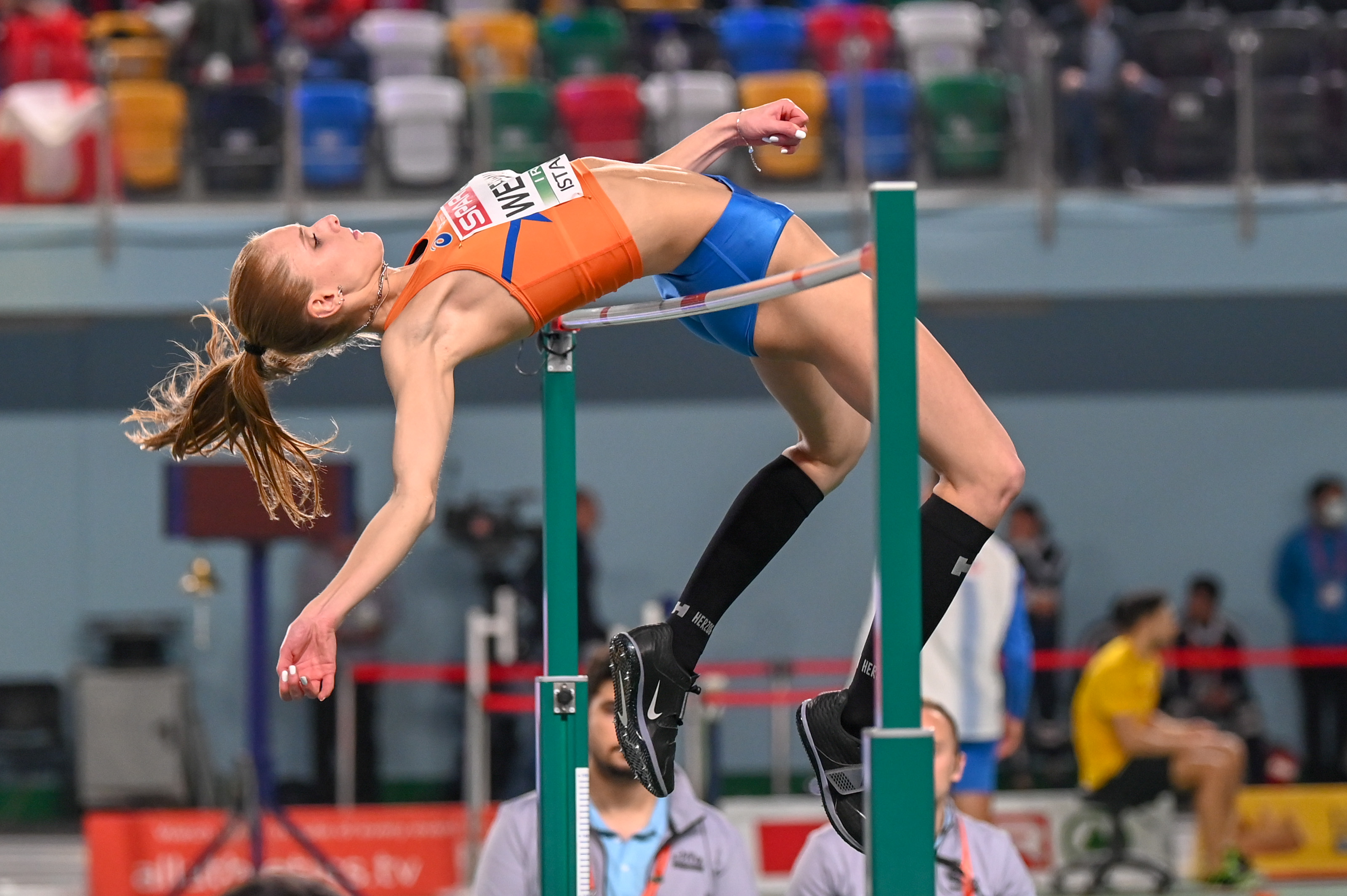
Britt Weerman in flight during the 2023 European Indoor Championships

The knee on the athlete's non-takeoff leg naturally turns their body, placing them in the air with their back to the bar. The athlete then drives their shoulders towards the back of their feet, arching their body over the bar. They can look over their shoulder to judge when to kick both feet over their head, causing their body to clear the bar and land on the mat.

== Area records ==
- Updated 8 August 2026.

Area	Men			Women		
Area	Mark	Season	Athlete	Mark	Season	Athlete
World	2.45 m (8 ft 1/4 in)	1993	Javier Sotomayor (CUB)	2.10 m (6 ft 10 1/2 in)	2024	Yaroslava Mahuchikh (UKR)
Area records
Africa (records)	2.38 m (7 ft 9 1/2 in)	2005	Jacques Freitag (RSA)	2.06 m (6 ft 9 in)	2003	Hestrie Cloete (RSA)
Asia (records)	2.43 m (7 ft 11 1/2 in)	2014	Mutaz Barsham (QAT)	2.00 m (6 ft 6 1/2 in)	2021	Nadezhda Dubovitskaya (KAZ)
Europe (records)	2.42 m (7 ft 11 1/4 in)	1987	Patrik Sjöberg (SWE)	2.10 m (6 ft 10 1/2 in)	2024	Yaroslava Mahuchikh (UKR)
Europe (records)	2.42 m (7 ft 11 1/4 in) i	1988	Carlo Thränhardt (FRG)	2.10 m (6 ft 10 1/2 in)	2024	Yaroslava Mahuchikh (UKR)
North, Central America and Caribbean (records)	2.45 m (8 ft 1/4 in)	1993	Javier Sotomayor (CUB)	2.05 m (6 ft 8 1/2 in)	2010	Chaunté Lowe (USA)
Oceania (records)	2.36 m (7 ft 8 3/4 in)	1997	Tim Forsyth (AUS)	2.04 m (6 ft 8 1/4 in)	2025	Nicola Olyslagers (AUS)
Oceania (records)	2.36 m (7 ft 8 3/4 in)	2018	Brandon Starc (AUS)	2.04 m (6 ft 8 1/4 in)	2025	Nicola Olyslagers (AUS)
Oceania (records)	2.36 m (7 ft 8 3/4 in)	2024	Hamish Kerr (NZL)	2.04 m (6 ft 8 1/4 in)	2025	Nicola Olyslagers (AUS)
Oceania (records)	2.36 m (7 ft 8 3/4 in)	2024	Hamish Kerr (NZL)	2.04 m (6 ft 8 1/4 in)	2025	Nicola Olyslagers (AUS)
Oceania (records)	2.36 m (7 ft 8 3/4 in)	2025	Hamish Kerr (NZL)	2.04 m (6 ft 8 1/4 in)	2025	Nicola Olyslagers (AUS)
South America (records)	2.33 m (7 ft 7 1/2 in)	1994	Gilmar Mayo (COL)	1.96 m (6 ft 5 in)	1997	Solange Witteveen (ARG)

- In 2014 Bohdan Bondarenko equaled the European outdoor record of 2.42 m, but for an unknown reason it was not applicable for ratification.

== All-time top 25 ==
Outdoor tables show data for two definitions of "Top 25" - the top 25 high jump marks and the top 25 athletes:
- denotes top performance for athletes in the top 25 high jump marks
- denotes lesser performances, still in the top 25 high jump marks, by repeat athletes
- denotes top performance (only) for other top 25 athletes who fall outside the top 25 high jump marks

- As of August 2025.

=== Men (outdoor) ===
Ath.#	Perf.#	Mark	Athlete	Nation	Date	Place	Ref.
1	1	2.45 m (8 ft 1/4 in)	Javier Sotomayor	Cuba	27 July 1993	Salamanca	
	2	2.44 m (8 ft 0 in)	Sotomayor #2		29 July 1989	San Juan	
	3	2.43 m (7 ft 11 1/2 in)	Sotomayor #3		8 September 1988	Salamanca	
2	3	2.43 m (7 ft 11 1/2 in)	Mutaz Essa Barshim	Qatar	5 September 2014	Brussels	
3	5	2.42 m (7 ft 11 1/4 in)	Patrik Sjöberg	Sweden	30 June 1987	Stockholm	
	5	2.42 m (7 ft 11 1/4 in)	Sotomayor #4		5 June 1994	Seville	
3	5	2.42 m (7 ft 11 1/4 in)	Bohdan Bondarenko	Ukraine	14 June 2014	New York City	
	5	2.42 m (7 ft 11 1/4 in)	Barshim #2		14 June 2014	New York City	
5	9	2.41 m (7 ft 10 3/4 in)	Igor Paklin	Soviet Union	4 September 1985	Kobe	
	9	2.41 m (7 ft 10 3/4 in)	Sotomayor #5		25 June 1994	Havana	
	9	2.41 m (7 ft 10 3/4 in)	Sotomayor #6		15 July 1994	London	
	9	2.41 m (7 ft 10 3/4 in)	Bondarenko #2		4 July 2013	Lausanne	
	9	2.41 m (7 ft 10 3/4 in)	Bondarenko #3		15 August 2013	Moscow	
	9	2.41 m (7 ft 10 3/4 in)	Barshim #3		5 June 2014	Rome	
	9	2.41 m (7 ft 10 3/4 in)	Barshim #4		22 August 2014	Eberstadt	
	9	2.41 m (7 ft 10 3/4 in)	Barshim #5		30 May 2015	Eugene	
6	17	2.40 m (7 ft 10 1/4 in)	Rudolf Povarnitsyn	Soviet Union	11 August 1985	Donetsk	
	17	2.40 m (7 ft 10 1/4 in)	Sotomayor #7		12 March 1989	Havana	
	17	2.40 m (7 ft 10 1/4 in)	Sjöberg #2		5 August 1989	Brussels	
	17	2.40 m (7 ft 10 1/4 in) A	Sotomayor #8		13 August 1989	Bogotá	
6	17	2.40 m (7 ft 10 1/4 in)	Sorin Matei	Romania	20 June 1990	Bratislava	
	17	2.40 m (7 ft 10 1/4 in)	Sotomayor #9		19 July 1991	Paris	
6	17	2.40 m (7 ft 10 1/4 in)	Charles Austin	United States	7 August 1991	Zurich	
	17	2.40 m (7 ft 10 1/4 in)	Sotomayor #10		22 May 1993	Havana	
	17	2.40 m (7 ft 10 1/4 in)	Sotomayor #11		23 July 1993	London	
	17	2.40 m (7 ft 10 1/4 in)	Sotomayor #12		22 August 1993	Stuttgart	
	17	2.40 m (7 ft 10 1/4 in)	Sotomayor #13		10 July 1994	Eberstadt	
	17	2.40 m (7 ft 10 1/4 in)	Sotomayor #14		18 July 1994	Nice	
	17	2.40 m (7 ft 10 1/4 in)	Sotomayor #15		29 July 1994	Saint Petersburg	
	17	2.40 m (7 ft 10 1/4 in)	Sotomayor #16		11 September 1994	London	
	17	2.40 m (7 ft 10 1/4 in)	Sotomayor #17		25 March 1995	Mar del Plata	
6	17	2.40 m (7 ft 10 1/4 in)	Vyacheslav Voronin	Russia	5 August 2000	London	
	17	2.40 m (7 ft 10 1/4 in)	Barshim #6		1 June 2013	Eugene	
6	17	2.40 m (7 ft 10 1/4 in)	Derek Drouin	Canada	25 April 2014	Des Moines	
	17	2.40 m (7 ft 10 1/4 in)	Bondarenko #4		11 May 2014	Tokyo	
	17	2.40 m (7 ft 10 1/4 in)	Bondarenko #5		3 July 2014	Lausanne	
6	17	2.40 m (7 ft 10 1/4 in)	Andriy Protsenko	Ukraine	3 July 2014	Lausanne	
	17	2.40 m (7 ft 10 1/4 in)	Bondarenko #6		18 July 2014	Monaco	
	17	2.40 m (7 ft 10 1/4 in)	Bondarenko #7		5 September 2014	Brussels	
	17	2.40 m (7 ft 10 1/4 in)	Barshim #7		11 June 2016	Opole	
	17	2.40 m (7 ft 10 1/4 in)	Barshim #8		20 August 2017	Birmingham	
	17	2.40 m (7 ft 10 1/4 in)	Barshim #9		27 August 2017	Eberstadt	
	17	2.40 m (7 ft 10 1/4 in)	Barshim #10		4 May 2018	Doha	
	17	2.40 m (7 ft 10 1/4 in)	Barshim #11		2 July 2018	Székesfehérvár	
12		2.39 m (7 ft 10 in)	Zhu Jianhua	China	10 June 1984	Eberstadt	
12		2.39 m (7 ft 10 in)	Hollis Conway	United States	30 July 1989	Norman	
12		2.39 m (7 ft 10 in)	Ivan Ukhov	Russia	5 July 2012	Cheboksary	
12		2.39 m (7 ft 10 in)	Gianmarco Tamberi	Italy	15 July 2016	Monaco	
16		2.38 m (7 ft 9 1/2 in)	Hennadiy Avdyeyenko	Soviet Union	6 September 1987	Rome	
16		2.38 m (7 ft 9 1/2 in)	Sergey Malchenko	Soviet Union	4 September 1988	Banská Bystrica	
16		2.38 m (7 ft 9 1/2 in)	Dragutin Topić	FR Yugoslavia	1 August 1993	Belgrade	
16		2.38 m (7 ft 9 1/2 in)	Troy Kemp	Bahamas	12 July 1995	Nice	
16		2.38 m (7 ft 9 1/2 in)	Artur Partyka	Poland	18 August 1996	Eberstadt	
16		2.38 m (7 ft 9 1/2 in)	Jacques Freitag	South Africa	5 March 2005	Oudtshoorn	
16		2.38 m (7 ft 9 1/2 in)	Andriy Sokolovskyy	Ukraine	8 July 2005	Rome	
16		2.38 m (7 ft 9 1/2 in)	Andrey Silnov	Russia	25 July 2008	London	
16		2.38 m (7 ft 9 1/2 in)	Zhang Guowei	China	30 May 2015	Eugene	
16		2.38 m (7 ft 9 1/2 in)	Danil Lysenko	Authorised Neutral Athletes	27 August 2017	Eberstadt	

==== Annulled marks ====
The following athletes have had their personal best annulled due to doping offences:

Mark	Athlete	Date	Place	Ref.
2.41 m (7 ft 10 3/4 in)	Ivan Ukhov (RUS)	10 May 2014	Doha	
2.40 m (7 ft 10 1/4 in)	Danil Lysenko (RUS)	20 July 2018	Monaco	

=== Women (outdoor) ===
Ath.#	Perf.#	Mark	Athlete	Nation	Date	Place	Ref.
1	1	2.10 m (6 ft 10 1/2 in)	Yaroslava Mahuchikh	Ukraine	7 July 2024	Paris	
2	2	2.09 m (6 ft 10 1/4 in)	Stefka Kostadinova	Bulgaria	30 August 1987	Rome	
	3	2.08 m (6 ft 9 3/4 in)	Kostadinova #2		31 May 1986	Sofia	
3	3	2.08 m (6 ft 9 3/4 in)	Blanka Vlašić	Croatia	31 August 2009	Zagreb	
4	5	2.07 m (6 ft 9 1/4 in)	Lyudmila Andonova	Bulgaria	20 July 1984	Berlin	
	5	2.07 m (6 ft 9 1/4 in)	Kostadinova #3		25 May 1986	Sofia	
	5	2.07 m (6 ft 9 1/4 in)	Kostadinova #4		16 September 1987	Cagliari	
	5	2.07 m (6 ft 9 1/4 in)	Kostadinova #5		3 September 1988	Sofia	
	5	2.07 m (6 ft 9 1/4 in)	Vlašić #2		7 August 2007	Stockholm	
4	5	2.07 m (6 ft 9 1/4 in)	Anna Chicherova	Russia	22 July 2011	Cheboksary	
	11	2.06 m (6 ft 9 in)	Kostadinova #6		18 August 1985	Moscow	
	11	2.06 m (6 ft 9 in)	Kostadinova #7		15 June 1986	Fürth	
	11	2.06 m (6 ft 9 in)	Kostadinova #8		14 September 1986	Cagliari	
	11	2.06 m (6 ft 9 in)	Kostadinova #9		6 June 1987	Worrstadt	
	11	2.06 m (6 ft 9 in)	Kostadinova #10		8 September 1987	Rieti	
6	11	2.06 m (6 ft 9 in)	Kajsa Bergqvist	Sweden	26 July 2003	Eberstadt	
6	11	2.06 m (6 ft 9 in)	Hestrie Cloete	South Africa	31 August 2003	Paris	
6	11	2.06 m (6 ft 9 in)	Yelena Slesarenko	Russia	28 August 2004	Athens	
	11	2.06 m (6 ft 9 in)	Vlašić #3		30 July 2007	Thessaloniki	
	11	2.06 m (6 ft 9 in)	Vlašić #4		22 June 2008	Istanbul	
	11	2.06 m (6 ft 9 in)	Vlašić #5		5 July 2008	Madrid	
6	11	2.06 m (6 ft 9 in)	Ariane Friedrich	Germany	14 June 2009	Berlin	
6	11	2.06 m (6 ft 9 in)	Mariya Lasitskene	Authorised Neutral Athletes	6 July 2017	Lausanne	
	11	2.06 m (6 ft 9 in)	Lasitskene #2		20 June 2019	Ostrava	
11	25	2.05 m (6 ft 8 1/2 in)	Tamara Bykova	Soviet Union	22 June 1984	Kyiv	
	25	2.05 m (6 ft 8 1/2 in)	Kostadinova #11		14 June 1986	Worrstadt	
	25	2.05 m (6 ft 8 1/2 in)	Kostadinova #12		7 September 1986	Rieti	
	25	2.05 m (6 ft 8 1/2 in)	Kostadinova #13		4 July 1987	Oslo	
	25	2.05 m (6 ft 8 1/2 in)	Kostadinova #14		13 September 1987	Padua	
	25	2.05 m (6 ft 8 1/2 in)	Kostadinova #15		12 August 1988	Budapest	
11	25	2.05 m (6 ft 8 1/2 in)	Heike Henkel	Germany	31 August 1991	Tokyo	
	25	2.05 m (6 ft 8 1/2 in)	Kostadinova #16		4 July 1992	San Marino	
	25	2.05 m (6 ft 8 1/2 in)	Kostadinova #17		18 September 1993	Fukuoka	
11	25	2.05 m (6 ft 8 1/2 in)	Inha Babakova	Ukraine	15 September 1995	Tokyo	
	25	2.05 m (6 ft 8 1/2 in)	Kostadinova #18		3 August 1996	Atlanta	
	25	2.05 m (6 ft 8 1/2 in)	Bergqvist #2		18 August 2002	Poznań	
	25	2.05 m (6 ft 8 1/2 in)	Cloete #2		10 August 2003	Berlin	
	25	2.05 m (6 ft 8 1/2 in)	Bergqvist #3		28 July 2006	London	
	25	2.05 m (6 ft 8 1/2 in)	Vlašić #6		21 July 2007	Madrid	
	25	2.05 m (6 ft 8 1/2 in)	Vlašić #7		2 September 2007	Osaka	
	25	2.05 m (6 ft 8 1/2 in)	Vlašić #8		12 June 2008	Ostrava	
	25	2.05 m (6 ft 8 1/2 in)	Vlašić #9		1 July 2008	Bydgoszcz	
11	25	2.05 m (6 ft 8 1/2 in)	Tia Hellebaut	Belgium	23 August 2008	Beijing	
	25	2.05 m (6 ft 8 1/2 in)	Vlašić #10		23 August 2008	Beijing	
	25	2.05 m (6 ft 8 1/2 in)	Vlašić #11		8 May 2009	Doha	
11	25	2.05 m (6 ft 8 1/2 in)	Chaunté Lowe	United States	26 June 2010	Des Moines	
	25	2.05 m (6 ft 8 1/2 in)	Vlašić #12		5 September 2010	Split	
	25	2.05 m (6 ft 8 1/2 in)	Chicherova #2		16 September 2011	Brussels	
	25	2.05 m (6 ft 8 1/2 in)	Chicherova #3		11 August 2012	London	
	25	2.05 m (6 ft 8 1/2 in)	Lasitskene #3		21 July 2017	Monaco	
	25	2.05 m (6 ft 8 1/2 in)	Lasitskene #4		8 September 2021	Zurich	
	25	2.05 m (6 ft 8 1/2 in)	Mahuchikh #2		2 September 2022	Brussels	
16		2.04 m (6 ft 8 1/4 in)	Silvia Costa	Cuba	9 September 1989	Barcelona	
16		2.04 m (6 ft 8 1/4 in)	Venelina Veneva-Mateeva	Bulgaria	2 June 2001	Kalamata	
16		2.04 m (6 ft 8 1/4 in)	Irina Gordeeva	Russia	19 August 2012	Eberstadt	
16		2.04 m (6 ft 8 1/4 in)	Brigetta Barrett	United States	22 June 2013	Des Moines	
16		2.04 m (6 ft 8 1/4 in)	Nicola Olyslagers	Australia	27 August 2025	Zurich	
21		2.03 m (6 ft 7 3/4 in)	Ulrike Meyfarth	West Germany	21 August 1983	London	
21		2.03 m (6 ft 7 3/4 in)	Louise Ritter	United States	8 July 1988	Austin	
21		2.03 m (6 ft 7 3/4 in)	Tatyana Motkova	Russia	30 May 1995	Bratislava	
21		2.03 m (6 ft 7 3/4 in)	Niki Bakoyianni	Greece	3 August 1996	Atlanta	
21		2.03 m (6 ft 7 3/4 in)	Antonietta Di Martino	Italy	24 June 2007	Milan	

=== Men (indoor) ===
Only one performance (best) per athlete

Rank	Mark	Athlete	Date	Place	Ref.
1	2.43 m (7 ft 11 1/2 in)	Javier Sotomayor (CUB)	4 March 1989	Budapest	
2	2.42 m (7 ft 11 1/4 in)	Carlo Thränhardt (FRG)	26 February 1988	Berlin	
3	2.41 m (7 ft 10 3/4 in)	Patrik Sjöberg (SWE)	1 February 1987	Piraeus	
3	2.41 m (7 ft 10 3/4 in)	Mutaz Essa Barshim (QAT)	18 February 2015	Athlone	
5	2.40 m (7 ft 10 1/4 in)	Hollis Conway (USA)	10 March 1991	Seville	
5	2.40 m (7 ft 10 1/4 in)	Stefan Holm (SWE)	6 March 2005	Madrid	
5	2.40 m (7 ft 10 1/4 in)	Ivan Ukhov (RUS)	25 February 2009	Piraeus	
5	2.40 m (7 ft 10 1/4 in)	Aleksey Dmitrik (RUS)	8 February 2014	Arnstadt	
9	2.39 m (7 ft 10 in)	Dietmar Mögenburg (FRG)	24 February 1985	Cologne	
9	2.39 m (7 ft 10 in)	Ralf Sonn (GER)	1 March 1991	Berlin	
11	2.38 m (7 ft 9 1/2 in)	Igor Paklin (URS)	7 March 1987	Indianapolis	
11	2.38 m (7 ft 9 1/2 in)	Gennadiy Avdeyenko (URS)	7 March 1987	Indianapolis	
11	2.38 m (7 ft 9 1/2 in)	Steve Smith (GBR)	4 February 1994	Wuppertal	
11	2.38 m (7 ft 9 1/2 in)	Wolf-Hendrik Beyer (GER)	18 March 1994	Weinheim	
11	2.38 m (7 ft 9 1/2 in)	Sorin Matei (ROU)	3 February 1995	Wuppertal	
11	2.38 m (7 ft 9 1/2 in)	Matt Hemingway (USA)	4 March 2000	Atlanta	
11	2.38 m (7 ft 9 1/2 in)	Yaroslav Rybakov (RUS)	15 February 2005	Stockholm	
11	2.38 m (7 ft 9 1/2 in)	Linus Thörnblad (SWE)	25 February 2007	Gothenburg	
11	2.38 m (7 ft 9 1/2 in)	Gianmarco Tamberi (ITA)	13 February 2016	Hustopeče	
11	2.38 m (7 ft 9 1/2 in)	Danil Lysenko (RUS)	29 January 2023	Moscow	
21	2.37 m (7 ft 9 1/4 in)	Artur Partyka (POL)	3 February 1991	Sulingen	
21	2.37 m (7 ft 9 1/4 in)	Dalton Grant (GBR)	13 March 1994	Paris	
21	2.37 m (7 ft 9 1/4 in)	Charles Austin (USA)	1 March 1996	Atlanta	
21	2.37 m (7 ft 9 1/4 in)	Vyacheslav Voronin (RUS)	5 March 2005	Glasgow	
21	2.37 m (7 ft 9 1/4 in)	Jaroslav Bába (CZE)	5 February 2000	Arnstadt	
21	2.37 m (7 ft 9 1/4 in)	Andrey Silnov (RUS)	2 February 2008	Arnstadt	
21	2.37 m (7 ft 9 1/4 in)	Maksim Nedasekau (BLR)	7 March 2021	Toruń	

==== Annulled marks ====
The following athletes have had their personal best annulled due to doping offences:

Mark	Athlete	Date	Place	Ref.
2.42 m (7 ft 11 1/4 in)	Ivan Ukhov (RUS)	25 February 2014	Prague	

=== Women (indoor) ===
Only one performance (best) per athlete

Rank	Mark	Athlete	Date	Place	Ref.
1	2.08 m (6 ft 9 3/4 in)	Kajsa Bergqvist (SWE)	4 February 2006	Arnstadt	
2	2.07 m (6 ft 9 1/4 in)	Heike Henkel (GER)	8 February 1992	Karlsruhe	
3	2.06 m (6 ft 9 in)	Stefka Kostadinova (BUL)	20 February 1988	Athens	
3	2.06 m (6 ft 9 in)	Blanka Vlašić (CRO)	6 February 2010	Arnstadt	
3	2.06 m (6 ft 9 in)	Anna Chicherova (RUS)	4 February 2012	Arnstadt	
3	2.06 m (6 ft 9 in)	Yaroslava Mahuchikh (UKR)	2 February 2021	Banská Bystrica	
7	2.05 m (6 ft 8 1/2 in)	Tia Hellebaut (BEL)	3 March 2007	Birmingham	
7	2.05 m (6 ft 8 1/2 in)	Ariane Friedrich (GER)	15 February 2009	Karlsruhe	
7	2.05 m (6 ft 8 1/2 in)	Mariya Lasitskene (RUS)	9 February 2020	Moscow	
10	2.04 m (6 ft 8 1/4 in)	Alina Astafei (GER)	3 March 1995	Berlin	
10	2.04 m (6 ft 8 1/4 in)	Yelena Slesarenko (RUS)	7 March 2004	Budapest	
10	2.04 m (6 ft 8 1/4 in)	Antonietta Di Martino (ITA)	9 February 2011	Banská Bystrica	
13	2.03 m (6 ft 7 3/4 in)	Tamara Bykova (URS)	6 March 1983	Budapest	
13	2.03 m (6 ft 7 3/4 in)	Monica Iagăr (ROU)	23 January 1999	Bucharest	
13	2.03 m (6 ft 7 3/4 in)	Marina Kuptsova (RUS)	2 March 2002	Vienna	
16	2.02 m (6 ft 7 1/2 in)	Susanne Beyer (GDR)	8 March 1987	Indianapolis	
16	2.02 m (6 ft 7 1/2 in)	Venelina Veneva-Mateeva (BUL)	2 February 2002	Łódź	
16	2.02 m (6 ft 7 1/2 in)	Yelena Yelesina (RUS)	26 February 2003	Moscow	
16	2.02 m (6 ft 7 1/2 in) A	Chaunte Lowe (USA)	26 February 2012	Albuquerque	
16	2.02 m (6 ft 7 1/2 in)	Kamila Lićwinko (POL)	21 February 2015	Toruń	
21	2.01 m (6 ft 7 in)	Gabriele Günz (GDR)	31 January 1988	Stuttgart	
21	2.01 m (6 ft 7 in)	Ioamnet Quintero (CUB)	5 March 1993	Berlin	
21	2.01 m (6 ft 7 in)	Tisha Waller (USA)	28 February 1998	Atlanta	
21	2.01 m (6 ft 7 in)	Ruth Beitia (ESP)	24 February 2007	Piraeus	
21	2.01 m (6 ft 7 in)	Vita Palamar (UKR)	9 March 2008	Valencia	
21	2.01 m (6 ft 7 in)	Irina Gordeeva (RUS)	28 January 2009	Cottbus	
21	2.01 m (6 ft 7 in)	Airinė Palšytė (LTU)	4 March 2017	Belgrade	

== Olympic medalists ==
=== Men ===
Games	Gold	Silver	Bronze
1896 Athens	Ellery Harding Clark; United States	James Brendan Connolly; United States	none awarded
1896 Athens	Ellery Harding Clark; United States	Robert Garrett; United States	none awarded
1900 Paris	Irving Baxter; United States	Patrick Leahy; Great Britain	Lajos Gönczy; Hungary
1904 St. Louis	Samuel Jones; United States	Garrett Serviss; United States	Paul Weinstein; Germany
1908 London	Harry Porter; United States	Géo André; France	none awarded
1908 London	Harry Porter; United States	Con Leahy; Great Britain	none awarded
1908 London	Harry Porter; United States	István Somodi; Hungary	none awarded
1912 Stockholm	Alma Richards; United States	Hans Liesche; Germany	George Horine; United States
1920 Antwerp	Richmond Landon; United States	Harold Muller; United States	Bo Ekelund; Sweden
1924 Paris	Harold Osborn; United States	Leroy Brown; United States	Pierre Lewden; France
1928 Amsterdam	Bob King; United States	Benjamin Hedges; United States	Claude Ménard; France
1932 Los Angeles	Duncan McNaughton; Canada	Bob Van Osdel; United States	Simeon Toribio; Philippines
1936 Berlin	Cornelius Johnson; United States	Dave Albritton; United States	Delos Thurber; United States
1948 London	John Winter; Australia	Bjørn Paulson; Norway	George Stanich; United States
1952 Helsinki	Walt Davis; United States	Ken Wiesner; United States	José da Conceição; Brazil
1956 Melbourne	Charles Dumas; United States	Chilla Porter; Australia	Igor Kashkarov; Soviet Union
1960 Rome	Robert Shavlakadze; Soviet Union	Valeriy Brumel; Soviet Union	John Thomas; United States
1964 Tokyo	Valeriy Brumel; Soviet Union	John Thomas; United States	John Rambo; United States
1968 Mexico City	Dick Fosbury; United States	Ed Caruthers; United States	Valentin Gavrilov; Soviet Union
1972 Munich	Jüri Tarmak; Soviet Union	Stefan Junge; East Germany	Dwight Stones; United States
1976 Montreal	Jacek Wszoła; Poland	Greg Joy; Canada	Dwight Stones; United States
1980 Moscow	Gerd Wessig; East Germany	Jacek Wszoła; Poland	Jörg Freimuth; East Germany
1984 Los Angeles	Dietmar Mögenburg; West Germany	Patrik Sjöberg; Sweden	Zhu Jianhua; China
1988 Seoul	Hennadiy Avdyeyenko; Soviet Union	Hollis Conway; United States	Rudolf Povarnitsyn; Soviet Union
1988 Seoul	Hennadiy Avdyeyenko; Soviet Union	Hollis Conway; United States	Patrik Sjöberg; Sweden
1992 Barcelona	Javier Sotomayor; Cuba	Patrik Sjöberg; Sweden	Hollis Conway; United States
1992 Barcelona	Javier Sotomayor; Cuba	Patrik Sjöberg; Sweden	Tim Forsyth; Australia
1992 Barcelona	Javier Sotomayor; Cuba	Patrik Sjöberg; Sweden	Artur Partyka; Poland
1996 Atlanta	Charles Austin; United States	Artur Partyka; Poland	Steve Smith; Great Britain
2000 Sydney	Sergey Klyugin; Russia	Javier Sotomayor; Cuba	Abderahmane Hammad; Algeria
2004 Athens	Stefan Holm; Sweden	Matt Hemingway; United States	Jaroslav Bába; Czech Republic
2008 Beijing	Andrey Silnov; Russia	Germaine Mason; Great Britain	Yaroslav Rybakov; Russia
2012 London	Erik Kynard; United States	Mutaz Essa Barshim; Qatar	none awarded
2012 London	Erik Kynard; United States	Derek Drouin; Canada	none awarded
2012 London	Erik Kynard; United States	Robbie Grabarz; Great Britain	none awarded
2016 Rio de Janeiro	Derek Drouin; Canada	Mutaz Essa Barshim; Qatar	Bohdan Bondarenko; Ukraine
2020 Tokyo	Gianmarco Tamberi; Italy	none awarded	Maksim Nedasekau; Belarus
2020 Tokyo	Mutaz Essa Barshim; Qatar	none awarded	Maksim Nedasekau; Belarus
2024 Paris	Hamish Kerr; New Zealand	Shelby McEwen; United States	Mutaz Essa Barshim; Qatar
2028 Los Angeles			

=== Women ===
Games	Gold	Silver	Bronze
1928 Amsterdam	Ethel Catherwood; Canada	Lien Gisolf; Netherlands	Mildred Wiley; United States
1932 Los Angeles	Jean Shiley; United States	Babe Didrikson; United States	Eva Dawes; Canada
1936 Berlin	Ibolya Csák; Hungary	Dorothy Odam; Great Britain	Elfriede Kaun; Germany
1948 London	Alice Coachman; United States	Dorothy Tyler; Great Britain	Micheline Ostermeyer; France
1952 Helsinki	Esther Brand; South Africa	Sheila Lerwill; Great Britain	Aleksandra Chudina; Soviet Union
1956 Melbourne	Mildred McDaniel; United States	Thelma Hopkins; Great Britain	none awarded
1956 Melbourne	Mildred McDaniel; United States	Mariya Pisareva; Soviet Union	none awarded
1960 Rome	Iolanda Balaș; Romania	Jarosława Jóźwiakowska; Poland	none awarded
1960 Rome	Iolanda Balaș; Romania	Dorothy Shirley; Great Britain	none awarded
1964 Tokyo	Iolanda Balaș; Romania	Michele Brown; Australia	Taisia Chenchik; Soviet Union
1968 Mexico City	Miloslava Rezková; Czechoslovakia	Antonina Okorokova; Soviet Union	Valentina Kozyr; Soviet Union
1972 Munich	Ulrike Meyfarth; West Germany	Yordanka Blagoeva; Bulgaria	Ilona Gusenbauer; Austria
1976 Montreal	Rosemarie Ackermann; East Germany	Sara Simeoni; Italy	Yordanka Blagoeva; Bulgaria
1980 Moscow	Sara Simeoni; Italy	Urszula Kielan; Poland	Jutta Kirst; East Germany
1984 Los Angeles	Ulrike Meyfarth; West Germany	Sara Simeoni; Italy	Joni Huntley; United States
1988 Seoul	Louise Ritter; United States	Stefka Kostadinova; Bulgaria	Tamara Bykova; Soviet Union
1992 Barcelona	Heike Henkel; Germany	Alina Astafei; Romania	Ioamnet Quintero; Cuba
1996 Atlanta	Stefka Kostadinova; Bulgaria	Niki Bakoyianni; Greece	Inha Babakova; Ukraine
2000 Sydney	Yelena Yelesina; Russia	Hestrie Cloete; South Africa	Kajsa Bergqvist; Sweden
2000 Sydney	Yelena Yelesina; Russia	Hestrie Cloete; South Africa	Oana Pantelimon; Romania
2004 Athens	Yelena Slesarenko; Russia	Hestrie Cloete; South Africa	Vita Styopina; Ukraine
2008 Beijing	Tia Hellebaut; Belgium	Blanka Vlašić; Croatia	Chaunté Howard; United States
2012 London	Anna Chicherova; Russia	Brigetta Barrett; United States	Ruth Beitia; Spain
2016 Rio de Janeiro	Ruth Beitia; Spain	Mirela Demireva; Bulgaria	Blanka Vlašić; Croatia
2020 Tokyo	Mariya Lasitskene; ROC	Nicola McDermott; Australia	Yaroslava Mahuchikh; Ukraine
2024 Paris	Yaroslava Mahuchikh; Ukraine	Nicola Olyslagers; Australia	Iryna Herashchenko; Ukraine
2024 Paris	Yaroslava Mahuchikh; Ukraine	Nicola Olyslagers; Australia	Eleanor Patterson; Australia
2028 Los Angeles			

== World Championships medalists ==
=== Men ===
Championships	Gold	Silver	Bronze
1983 Helsinki	Hennadiy Avdyeyenko (URS)	Tyke Peacock (USA)	Zhu Jianhua (CHN)
1987 Rome	Patrik Sjöberg (SWE)	Hennadiy Avdyeyenko (URS) Igor Paklin (URS)	none awarded
1991 Tokyo	Charles Austin (USA)	Javier Sotomayor (CUB)	Hollis Conway (USA)
1993 Stuttgart	Javier Sotomayor (CUB)	Artur Partyka (POL)	Steve Smith (GBR)
1995 Gothenburg	Troy Kemp (BAH)	Javier Sotomayor (CUB)	Artur Partyka (POL)
1997 Athens	Javier Sotomayor (CUB)	Artur Partyka (POL)	Tim Forsyth (AUS)
1999 Seville	Vyacheslav Voronin (RUS)	Mark Boswell (CAN)	Martin Buß (GER)
2001 Edmonton	Martin Buß (GER)	Yaroslav Rybakov (RUS) Vyacheslav Voronin (RUS)	none awarded
2003 Saint-Denis	Jacques Freitag (RSA)	Stefan Holm (SWE)	Mark Boswell (CAN)
2005 Helsinki	Yuriy Krymarenko (UKR)	Víctor Moya (CUB) Yaroslav Rybakov (RUS)	none awarded
2007 Osaka	Donald Thomas (BAH)	Yaroslav Rybakov (RUS)	Kyriakos Ioannou (CYP)
2009 Berlin	Yaroslav Rybakov (RUS)	Kyriakos Ioannou (CYP)	Sylwester Bednarek (POL) Raúl Spank (GER)
2011 Daegu	Jesse Williams (USA)	Aleksey Dmitrik (RUS)	Trevor Barry (BAH)
2013 Moscow	Bohdan Bondarenko (UKR)	Mutaz Essa Barshim (QAT)	Derek Drouin (CAN)
2015 Beijing	Derek Drouin (CAN)	Bohdan Bondarenko (UKR) Zhang Guowei (CHN)	none awarded
2017 London	Mutaz Essa Barshim (QAT)	Danil Lysenko (ANA)	Majdeddin Ghazal (SYR)
2019 Doha	Mutaz Essa Barshim (QAT)	Mikhail Akimenko (ANA)	Ilya Ivanyuk (ANA)
2022 Eugene	Mutaz Essa Barshim (QAT)	Woo Sang-hyeok (KOR)	Andriy Protsenko (UKR)
2023 Budapest	Gianmarco Tamberi (ITA)	JuVaughn Harrison (USA)	Mutaz Essa Barshim (QAT)
2025 Tokyo	Hamish Kerr (NZL)	Woo Sang-hyeok (KOR)	Jan Štefela (CZE)

==== Medal table ====
Rank	Nation	Gold	Silver	Bronze	Total
1	Qatar (QAT)	3	1	1	5
2	Russia (RUS)	2	5	0	7
3	Cuba (CUB)	2	3	0	5
4	United States (USA)	2	2	1	5
5	Ukraine (UKR)	2	1	1	4
6	Bahamas (BAH)	2	0	1	3
7	Soviet Union (URS)	1	2	0	3
8	Canada (CAN)	1	1	2	4
9	Sweden (SWE)	1	1	0	2
10	Germany (GER)	1	0	2	3
11	Italy (ITA)	1	0	0	1
11	New Zealand (NZL)	1	0	0	1
11	South Africa (RSA)	1	0	0	1
14	Poland (POL)	0	2	2	4
–	Authorised Neutral Athletes (ANA)	0	2	1	3
15	South Korea (KOR)	0	2	0	2
16	China (CHN)	0	1	1	2
16	Cyprus (CYP)	0	1	1	2
18	Australia (AUS)	0	0	1	1
18	Czech Republic (CZE)	0	0	1	1
18	Great Britain (GBR)	0	0	1	1
18	Syria (SYR)	0	0	1	1
Totals (21 entries)		20	24	17	61

=== Women ===
Championships	Gold	Silver	Bronze
1983 Helsinki	Tamara Bykova (URS)	Ulrike Meyfarth (FRG)	Louise Ritter (USA)
1987 Rome	Stefka Kostadinova (BUL)	Tamara Bykova (URS)	Susanne Beyer (GDR)
1991 Tokyo	Heike Henkel (GER)	Yelena Yelesina (URS)	Inha Babakova (URS)
1993 Stuttgart	Ioamnet Quintero (CUB)	Silvia Costa (CUB)	Sigrid Kirchmann (AUT)
1995 Gothenburg	Stefka Kostadinova (BUL)	Alina Astafei (GER)	Inha Babakova (UKR)
1997 Athens	Hanne Haugland (NOR)	Inha Babakova (UKR) Olga Kaliturina (RUS)	none awarded
1999 Seville	Inha Babakova (UKR)	Yelena Yelesina (RUS)	Svetlana Lapina (RUS)
2001 Edmonton	Hestrie Cloete (RSA)	Inha Babakova (UKR)	Kajsa Bergqvist (SWE)
2003 Saint-Denis	Hestrie Cloete (RSA)	Marina Kuptsova (RUS)	Kajsa Bergqvist (SWE)
2005 Helsinki	Kajsa Bergqvist (SWE)	Chaunté Howard (USA)	Emma Green (SWE)
2007 Osaka	Blanka Vlašić (CRO)	Anna Chicherova (RUS) Antonietta Di Martino (ITA)	none awarded
2009 Berlin	Blanka Vlašić (CRO)	Ariane Friedrich (GER)	Antonietta Di Martino (ITA)
2011 Daegu	Anna Chicherova (RUS)	Blanka Vlašić (CRO)	Antonietta Di Martino (ITA)
2013 Moscow	Brigetta Barrett (USA)	Anna Chicherova (RUS) Ruth Beitia (ESP)	none awarded
2015 Beijing	Mariya Kuchina (RUS)	Blanka Vlašić (CRO)	Anna Chicherova (RUS)
2017 London	Mariya Lasitskene (ANA)	Yuliya Levchenko (UKR)	Kamila Lićwinko (POL)
2019 Doha	Mariya Lasitskene (ANA)	Yaroslava Mahuchikh (UKR)	Vashti Cunningham (USA)
2022 Eugene	Eleanor Patterson (AUS)	Yaroslava Mahuchikh (UKR)	Elena Vallortigara (ITA)
2023 Budapest	Yaroslava Mahuchikh (UKR)	Eleanor Patterson (AUS)	Nicola Olyslagers (AUS)
2025 Tokyo	Nicola Olyslagers (AUS)	Maria Żodzik (POL)	Yaroslava Mahuchikh (UKR) Angelina Topić (SRB)

== World Indoor Championships medalists ==
=== Men ===
Games	Gold	Silver	Bronze
1985 Paris^{[A]}	Patrik Sjöberg (SWE)	Javier Sotomayor (CUB)	Othmane Belfaa (ALG)
1987 Indianapolis	Igor Paklin (URS)	Hennadiy Avdyeyenko (URS)	Ján Zvara (TCH)
1989 Budapest	Javier Sotomayor (CUB)	Dietmar Mögenburg (FRG)	Patrik Sjöberg (SWE)
1991 Seville	Hollis Conway (USA)	Artur Partyka (POL)	Javier Sotomayor (CUB) Aleksey Yemelin (URS)
1993 Toronto	Javier Sotomayor (CUB)	Patrik Sjöberg (SWE)	Steve Smith (GBR)
1995 Barcelona	Javier Sotomayor (CUB)	Labros Papakostas (GRE)	Tony Barton (USA)
1997 Paris	Charles Austin (USA)	Labros Papakostas (GRE)	Dragutin Topić (FRY)
1999 Maebashi	Javier Sotomayor (CUB)	Vyacheslav Voronin (RUS)	Charles Austin (USA)
2001 Lisbon	Stefan Holm (SWE)	Andriy Sokolovskyy (UKR)	Staffan Strand (SWE)
2003 Birmingham	Stefan Holm (SWE)	Yaroslav Rybakov (RUS)	Henadz Maroz (BLR)
2004 Budapest	Stefan Holm (SWE)	Yaroslav Rybakov (RUS)	Ștefan Vasilache (ROU) Germaine Mason (JAM) Jaroslav Bába (CZE)
2006 Moscow	Yaroslav Rybakov (RUS)	Andrey Tereshin (RUS)	Linus Thörnblad (SWE)
2008 Valencia	Stefan Holm (SWE)	Yaroslav Rybakov (RUS)	Kyriakos Ioannou (CYP) Andra Manson (USA)
2010 Doha	Ivan Ukhov (RUS)	Yaroslav Rybakov (RUS)	Dusty Jonas (USA)
2012 Istanbul	Dimitrios Chondrokoukis (GRE)	Andrey Silnov (RUS)	Ivan Ukhov (RUS)
2014 Sopot	Mutaz Essa Barshim (QAT)	Ivan Ukhov (RUS)	Andriy Protsenko (UKR)
2016 Portland	Gianmarco Tamberi (ITA)	Robert Grabarz (GBR)	Erik Kynard (USA)
2018 Birmingham	Danil Lysenko (ANA)	Mutaz Essa Barshim (QAT)	Mateusz Przybylko (GER)
2022 Belgrade	Woo Sang-hyeok (KOR)	Loïc Gasch (SUI)	Gianmarco Tamberi (ITA) Hamish Kerr (NZL)
2024 Glasgow	Hamish Kerr (NZL)	Shelby McEwen (USA)	Woo Sang-hyeok (KOR)
2025 Nanjing	Woo Sang-hyeok (KOR)	Hamish Kerr (NZL)	Raymond Richards (JAM)
2026 Toruń	Oleh Doroshchuk (UKR)	Erick Portillo (MEX)	Raymond Richards (JAM) Woo Sang-hyeok (KOR)

=== Women ===
Games	Gold	Silver	Bronze
1985 Paris^{[A]}	Stefka Kostadinova (BUL)	Susanne Lorentzon (SWE)	Debbie Brill (CAN) Danuta Bułkowska (POL) Silvia Costa (CUB)
1987 Indianapolis	Stefka Kostadinova (BUL)	Susanne Beyer (GDR)	Emilia Dragieva (BUL)
1989 Budapest	Stefka Kostadinova (BUL)	Tamara Bykova (URS)	Heike Redetzky (FRG)
1991 Seville	Heike Henkel (GER)	Tamara Bykova (URS)	Heike Balck (GER)
1993 Toronto	Stefka Kostadinova (BUL)	Heike Henkel (GER)	Inha Babakova (UKR)
1995 Barcelona	Alina Astafei (GER)	Britta Bilač (SLO)	Heike Henkel (GER)
1997 Paris	Stefka Kostadinova (BUL)	Inha Babakova (UKR)	Hanne Haugland (NOR)
1999 Maebashi	Khristina Kalcheva (BUL)	Zuzana Hlavoňová (CZE)	Tisha Waller (USA)
2001 Lisbon	Kajsa Bergqvist (SWE)	Inha Babakova (UKR)	Venelina Veneva (BUL)
2003 Birmingham	Kajsa Bergqvist (SWE)	Yelena Yelesina (RUS)	Anna Chicherova (RUS)
2004 Budapest	Yelena Slesarenko (RUS)	Anna Chicherova (RUS)	Blanka Vlašić (CRO)
2006 Moscow	Yelena Slesarenko (RUS)	Blanka Vlašić (CRO)	Ruth Beitia (ESP)
2008 Valencia	Blanka Vlašić (CRO)	Yelena Slesarenko (RUS)	Vita Palamar (UKR)
2010 Doha	Blanka Vlašić (CRO)	Ruth Beitia (ESP)	Chaunté Lowe (USA)
2012 Istanbul	Chaunté Lowe (USA)	Antonietta Di Martino (ITA) Anna Chicherova (RUS) Ebba Jungmark (SWE)	none awarded
2014 Sopot	Mariya Kuchina (RUS) Kamila Lićwinko (POL)	none awarded	Ruth Beitia (ESP)
2016 Portland	Vashti Cunningham (USA)	Ruth Beitia (ESP)	Kamila Lićwinko (POL)
2018 Birmingham	Mariya Lasitskene (ANA)	Vashti Cunningham (USA)	Alessia Trost (ITA)
2022 Belgrade	Yaroslava Mahuchikh (UKR)	Eleanor Patterson (AUS)	Nadezhda Dubovitskaya (KAZ)
2024 Glasgow	Nicola Olyslagers (AUS)	Yaroslava Mahuchikh (UKR)	Lia Apostolovski (SLO)
2025 Nanjing	Nicola Olyslagers (AUS)	Eleanor Patterson (AUS)	Yaroslava Mahuchikh (UKR)
2026 Toruń	Yaroslava Mahuchikh (UKR)	Angelina Topić (SER) Nicola Olyslagers (AUS) Yuliya Levchenko (UKR)	none awarded

- ^{^{A}} Known as the World Indoor Games.

== Athletes with most medals ==
Athletes who have won multiple titles at the two most important competitions, the Olympic Games and the World Championships:

- 4 wins: Mariya Lasitskene (RUS) - Olympic Champion in 2020, World Champion in 2015, 2017 & 2019
- 4 wins: Mutaz Essa Barshim (QAT) - Olympic Champion in 2020, World Champion in 2017, 2019 & 2022
- 3 wins: Javier Sotomayor (CUB) - Olympic Champion in 1992, World Champion in 1993 & 1997
- 3 wins: Stefka Kostadinova (BUL) - Olympic Champion in 1996, World Champion in 1987 & 1995
- 2 wins: Gennadiy Avdeyenko (URS) - Olympic Champion in 1988, World Champion in 1983
- 2 wins: Charles Austin (USA) - Olympic Champion in 1996, World Champion in 1991
- 2 wins: Iolanda Balaș (ROU) - Olympic Champion in 1960 & 1964
- 2 wins: Ulrike Meyfarth (FRG) - Olympic Champion in 1972 & 1984
- 2 wins: Heike Henkel (GER) - Olympic Champion in 1992, World Champion in 1991
- 2 wins: Hestrie Cloete (RSA) - World Champion in 2001 & 2003
- 2 wins: Blanka Vlašić (CRO) - World Champion in 2007 & 2009
- 2 wins: Anna Chicherova (RUS) - Olympic Champion in 2012, World Champion in 2011
- 2 wins: Gianmarco Tamberi (ITA) - Olympic Champion in 2020, World Champion in 2023
- 2 wins: Yaroslava Mahuchikh (UKR) - Olympic Champion in 2024, World Champion in 2023
- 2 wins: Hamish Kerr (NZL) - Olympic Champion in 2024, World Champion in 2025

Kostadinova, Sotomayor and Mahuchikh are the only high jumpers to have been Olympic Champion, World Champion and broken the world record.

== World leading marks ==
=== Men ===
Year	Mark	Athlete	Place
1970	2.29 m (7 ft 6 in)	Ni Zhiqin (CHN)	Changsha
1971	2.29 m (7 ft 6 in)	Pat Matzdorf (USA)	Berkeley
1972	2.25 m (7 ft 4 1/2 in)	Jüri Tarmak (URS)	Moscow
1973	2.30 m (7 ft 6 1/2 in)	Dwight Stones (USA)	Munich
1974	2.28 m (7 ft 5 3/4 in)	Dwight Stones (USA)	Oslo
1975	2.28 m (7 ft 5 3/4 in)	Dwight Stones (USA)	New York
1976	2.32 m (7 ft 7 1/4 in)	Dwight Stones (USA)	Philadelphia
1977	2.33 m (7 ft 7 1/2 in)	Vladimir Yashchenko (URS)	Richmond
1978	2.35 m (7 ft 8 1/2 in) i	Vladimir Yashchenko (URS)	Milan
1979	2.32 m (7 ft 7 1/4 in)	Dietmar Mögenburg (FRG)	Ottawa
1980	2.36 m (7 ft 8 3/4 in)	Gerd Wessig (GDR)	Moscow
1981	2.33 m (7 ft 7 1/2 in)	Aleksey Demyanyuk (URS)	Leningrad
1982	2.33 m (7 ft 7 1/2 in)	Zhu Jianhua (CHN)	Delhi
1983	2.38 m (7 ft 9 1/2 in)	Zhu Jianhua (CHN)	Shanghai
1984	2.39 m (7 ft 10 in)	Zhu Jianhua (CHN)	Eberstadt
1985	2.41 m (7 ft 10 3/4 in)	Igor Paklin (URS)	Kobe
1986	2.38 m (7 ft 9 1/2 in)	Igor Paklin (URS)	Rieti
1987	2.42 m (7 ft 11 1/4 in)	Patrik Sjöberg (SWE)	Stockholm
1988	2.43 m (7 ft 11 1/2 in)	Javier Sotomayor (CUB)	Salamanca
1989	2.44 m (8 ft 0 in)	Javier Sotomayor (CUB)	San Juan
1990	2.40 m (7 ft 10 1/4 in)	Sorin Matei (ROU)	Bratislava
1991	2.40 m (7 ft 10 1/4 in) i	Hollis Conway (USA)	Seville
1991	2.40 m (7 ft 10 1/4 in)	Javier Sotomayor (CUB)	Saint-Denis
1991	2.40 m (7 ft 10 1/4 in)	Charles Austin (USA)	Zürich
1992	2.38 m (7 ft 9 1/2 in) i	Patrik Sjöberg (SWE)	Genoa
1993	2.45 m (8 ft 1/4 in)	Javier Sotomayor (CUB)	Salamanca
1994	2.42 m (7 ft 11 1/4 in)	Javier Sotomayor (CUB)	Seville
1995	2.40 m (7 ft 10 1/4 in)	Javier Sotomayor (CUB)	Mar del Plata
1996	2.39 m (7 ft 10 in)	Charles Austin (USA)	Atlanta
1997	2.37 m (7 ft 9 1/4 in)	Javier Sotomayor (CUB)	Athens
1998	2.37 m (7 ft 9 1/4 in)	Javier Sotomayor (CUB)	Maracaibo
1999	2.37 m (7 ft 9 1/4 in)	Vyacheslav Voronin (RUS)	Seville
2000	2.40 m (7 ft 10 1/4 in)	Vyacheslav Voronin (RUS)	London
2001	2.37 m (7 ft 9 1/4 in)	Vyacheslav Voronin (RUS)	Eberstadt
2002	2.37 m (7 ft 9 1/4 in)	Jacques Freitag (RSA)	Durban
2003	2.36 m (7 ft 8 3/4 in) i	Stefan Holm (SWE)	Arnstadt
2003	2.36 m (7 ft 8 3/4 in)	Aleksander Walerianczyk (POL)	Bydgoszcz
2004	2.37 m (7 ft 9 1/4 in) i	Stefan Holm (SWE)	Stockholm
2005	2.40 m (7 ft 10 1/4 in) i	Stefan Holm (SWE)	Madrid
2006	2.37 m (7 ft 9 1/4 in) i	Yaroslav Rybakov (RUS)	Arnstadt
2006	2.37 m (7 ft 9 1/4 in) i	Yaroslav Rybakov (RUS)	Moscow
2006	2.37 m (7 ft 9 1/4 in) i	Ivan Ukhov (RUS)	Arnstadt
2006	2.37 m (7 ft 9 1/4 in)	Andrey Silnov (RUS)	Monaco
2007	2.39 m (7 ft 10 in) i	Ivan Ukhov (RUS)	Moscow
2008	2.38 m (7 ft 9 1/2 in) i	Yaroslav Rybakov (RUS)	Moscow
2008	2.38 m (7 ft 9 1/2 in)	Andrey Silnov (RUS)	London
2009	2.40 m (7 ft 10 1/4 in) i	Ivan Ukhov (RUS)	Piraeus
2010	2.38 m (7 ft 9 1/2 in) i	Ivan Ukhov (RUS)	Banská Bystrica
2011	2.38 m (7 ft 9 1/2 in) i	Ivan Ukhov (RUS)	Hustopeče
2011	2.38 m (7 ft 9 1/2 in) i	Ivan Ukhov (RUS)	Banská Bystrica
2011	2.38 m (7 ft 9 1/2 in) i	Ivan Ukhov (RUS)	Paris
2012	2.39 m (7 ft 10 in)	Ivan Ukhov (RUS)	Cheboksary
2012	2.39 m (7 ft 10 in)	Mutaz Essa Barshim (QAT)	Lausanne
2013	2.41 m (7 ft 10 3/4 in)	Bohdan Bondarenko (UKR)	Lausanne
2013	2.41 m (7 ft 10 3/4 in)	Bohdan Bondarenko (UKR)	Moscow
2014	2.43 m (7 ft 11 1/2 in)	Mutaz Essa Barshim (QAT)	Brussels
2015	2.41 m (7 ft 10 3/4 in) i	Mutaz Essa Barshim (QAT)	Athlone
2015	2.41 m (7 ft 10 3/4 in)	Mutaz Essa Barshim (QAT)	Eugene
2016	2.40 m (7 ft 10 1/4 in)	Mutaz Essa Barshim (QAT)	Opole
2017	2.40 m (7 ft 10 1/4 in)	Mutaz Essa Barshim (QAT)	Birmingham
2017	2.40 m (7 ft 10 1/4 in)	Mutaz Essa Barshim (QAT)	Eberstadt
2018	2.40 m (7 ft 10 1/4 in)	Mutaz Essa Barshim (QAT)	Doha
2018	2.40 m (7 ft 10 1/4 in)	Mutaz Essa Barshim (QAT)	Székesfehérvár
2019	2.37 m (7 ft 9 1/4 in)	Mutaz Essa Barshim (QAT)	Doha
2020	2.33 m (7 ft 7 1/2 in) i	Darryl Sullivan (USA)	Blacksburg
2020	2.33 m (7 ft 7 1/2 in) i	Tom Gale (GBR)	Hustopeče
2020	2.33 m (7 ft 7 1/2 in) i	Jamal Wilson (BAH)	Banská Bystrica
2020	2.33 m (7 ft 7 1/2 in) i	Luis Zayas (CUB)	Banská Bystrica
2020	2.33 m (7 ft 7 1/2 in) i	Ilya Ivanyuk (RUS)	Moscow
2020	2.33 m (7 ft 7 1/2 in)	Maksim Nedasekau (BLR)	Minsk
2021	2.37 m (7 ft 9 1/4 in) i	Maksim Nedasekau (BLR)	Toruń
2021	2.37 m (7 ft 9 1/4 in)	Maksim Nedasekau (BLR)	Székesfehérvár
2021	2.37 m (7 ft 9 1/4 in)	Maksim Nedasekau (BLR)	Tokyo
2021	2.37 m (7 ft 9 1/4 in)	Ilya Ivanyuk (ANA)	Smolensk
2021	2.37 m (7 ft 9 1/4 in)	Gianmarco Tamberi (ITA)	Tokyo
2021	2.37 m (7 ft 9 1/4 in)	Mutaz Essa Barshim (QAT)	Tokyo
2022	2.37 m (7 ft 9 1/4 in)	Mutaz Essa Barshim (QAT)	Eugene
2023	2.38 m (7 ft 9 1/2 in) i	Danil Lysenko (RUS)	Moscow
2024	2.37 m (7 ft 9 1/4 in)	Gianmarco Tamberi (ITA)	Rome
2025	2.36 m (7 ft 8 3/4 in)	Hamish Kerr (NZL)	Tokyo
2026	2.37 m (7 ft 9 1/4 in)	Gianmarco Tamberi (ITA)	Budapest

=== Women ===
Year	Mark	Athlete	Place
1970	1.87 m (6 ft 1 1/2 in)	Antonina Lazareva (URS)	Kyiv
1971	1.92 m (6 ft 3 1/2 in)	Ilona Gusenbauer (AUT)	Vienna
1972	1.94 m (6 ft 4 1/4 in)	Yordanka Blagoeva (BUL)	Zagreb
1973	1.92 m (6 ft 3 1/2 in)	Yordanka Blagoeva (BUL)	Warsaw
1974	1.95 m (6 ft 4 3/4 in)	Rosemarie Ackermann (GDR)	Rome
1975	1.94 m (6 ft 4 1/4 in)	Rosemarie Ackermann (GDR)	Nice
1976	1.96 m (6 ft 5 in)	Rosemarie Ackermann (GDR)	Dresden
1977	2.00 m (6 ft 6 1/2 in)	Rosemarie Ackermann (GDR)	Berlin
1978	2.01 m (6 ft 7 in)	Sara Simeoni (ITA)	Brescia
1979	1.99 m (6 ft 6 1/4 in)	Rosemarie Ackermann (GDR)	Turin
1980	1.98 m (6 ft 5 3/4 in)	Sara Simeoni (ITA)	Turin
1981	1.97 m (6 ft 5 1/2 in)	Pam Spencer (USA)	Brussels
1982	2.02 m (6 ft 7 1/2 in)	Ulrike Meyfarth (FRG)	Athens
1983	2.04 m (6 ft 8 1/4 in)	Tamara Bykova (URS)	Pisa
1983	2.04 m (6 ft 8 1/4 in)	Tamara Bykova (URS)	Budapest
1984	2.07 m (6 ft 9 1/4 in)	Lyudmila Andonova (BUL)	Berlin
1985	2.06 m (6 ft 9 in)	Stefka Kostadinova (BUL)	Moscow
1986	2.08 m (6 ft 9 3/4 in)	Stefka Kostadinova (BUL)	Sofia
1987	2.09 m (6 ft 10 1/4 in)	Stefka Kostadinova (BUL)	Rome
1988	2.07 m (6 ft 9 1/4 in)	Stefka Kostadinova (BUL)	Sofia
1989	2.04 m (6 ft 8 1/4 in)	Silvia Costa (CUB)	Barcelona
1989	2.04 m (6 ft 8 1/4 in)	Stefka Kostadinova (BUL)	Pireás
1990	2.02 m (6 ft 7 1/2 in)	Yelena Yelesina (URS)	Seattle
1991	2.05 m (6 ft 8 1/2 in)	Heike Henkel (GER)	Tokyo
1992	2.07 m (6 ft 9 1/4 in) i	Heike Henkel (GER)	Karlsruhe
1993	2.05 m (6 ft 8 1/2 in)	Stefka Kostadinova (BUL)	Fukuoka
1994	2.02 m (6 ft 7 1/2 in) i	Alina Astafei (GER)	Berlin
1995	2.05 m (6 ft 8 1/2 in)	Inga Babakova (UKR)	Tokyo
1996	2.05 m (6 ft 8 1/2 in)	Stefka Kostadinova (BUL)	Atlanta
1997	2.02 m (6 ft 7 1/2 in)	Stefka Kostadinova (BUL)	Osaka
1997	2.02 m (6 ft 7 1/2 in)	Stefka Kostadinova (BUL)	Paris-Bercy
1997	2.02 m (6 ft 7 1/2 in)	Inga Babakova (UKR)	Fukuoka
1998	2.03 m (6 ft 7 3/4 in)	Venelina Veneva (BUL)	Kalamata
1999	2.04 m (6 ft 8 1/4 in)	Hestrie Cloete (RSA)	Monaco
2000	2.02 m (6 ft 7 1/2 in)	Monica Iagăr (ROU)	Villeneuve d'Ascq
2001	2.04 m (6 ft 8 1/4 in)	Venelina Veneva (BUL)	Kalamáta
2002	2.05 m (6 ft 8 1/2 in)	Kajsa Bergqvist (SWE)	Poznań
2003	2.06 m (6 ft 9 in)	Kajsa Bergqvist (SWE)	Eberstadt
2003	2.06 m (6 ft 9 in)	Hestrie Cloete (RSA)	Saint-Denis
2004	2.06 m (6 ft 9 in)	Yelena Slesarenko (RUS)	Athens
2005	2.03 m (6 ft 7 3/4 in)	Kajsa Bergqvist (SWE)	Sheffield
2006	2.08 m (6 ft 9 3/4 in) i	Kajsa Bergqvist (SWE)	Arnstadt
2007	2.07 m (6 ft 9 1/4 in)	Blanka Vlašić (CRO)	Stockholm
2008	2.06 m (6 ft 9 in)	Blanka Vlašić (CRO)	Istanbul
2008	2.06 m (6 ft 9 in)	Blanka Vlašić (CRO)	Madrid
2009	2.08 m (6 ft 9 3/4 in)	Blanka Vlašić (CRO)	Zagreb
2010	2.06 m (6 ft 9 in) i	Blanka Vlašić (CRO)	Arnstadt
2011	2.07 m (6 ft 9 1/4 in)	Anna Chicherova (RUS)	Cheboksary
2012	2.06 m (6 ft 9 in) i	Anna Chicherova (RUS)	Arnstadt
2013	2.04 m (6 ft 8 1/4 in)	Brigetta Barrett (USA)	Des Moines
2014	2.01 m (6 ft 7 in) i	Mariya Kuchina (RUS)	Stockholm
2014	2.01 m (6 ft 7 in)	Anna Chicherova (RUS)	Eugene
2014	2.01 m (6 ft 7 in)	Ruth Beitia (ESP)	Zürich
2015	2.03 m (6 ft 7 3/4 in)	Anna Chicherova (RUS)	Lausanne
2016	2.01 m (6 ft 7 in)	Chaunté Lowe (USA)	Eugene
2017	2.06 m (6 ft 9 in)	Mariya Lasitskene (ANA)	Lausanne
2018	2.04 m (6 ft 8 1/4 in)	Mariya Lasitskene (ANA)	Paris
2018	2.04 m (6 ft 8 1/4 in)	Mariya Lasitskene (ANA)	London
2019	2.06 m (6 ft 9 in)	Mariya Lasitskene (ANA)	Ostrava
2020	2.05 m (6 ft 8 1/2 in) i	Mariya Lasitskene (RUS)	Moscow
2021	2.06 m (6 ft 9 in) i	Yaroslava Mahuchikh (UKR)	Banská Bystrica
2022	2.05 m (6 ft 8 1/2 in)	Yaroslava Mahuchikh (UKR)	Brussels
2023	2.03 m (6 ft 7 3/4 in)	Yaroslava Mahuchikh (UKR)	Eugene
2023	2.03 m (6 ft 7 3/4 in)	Nicola Olyslagers (AUS)	Eugene
2024	2.10 m (6 ft 10 1/2 in)	Yaroslava Mahuchikh (UKR)	Paris
2025	2.04 m (6 ft 8 1/4 in)	Nicola Olyslagers (AUS)	Zürich
2026	2.03 m (6 ft 7 3/4 in) i	Yaroslava Mahuchikh (UKR)	Lviv

== See also ==
- National records in high jump
- List of high jump national champions (men)
- List of high jump national champions (women)
- Standing high jump

== Sources ==
- The Complete Book of Track and Field, by Tom McNab
- The World Almanac and Book of Facts, 2000
