= Straddle technique =

High jump technique

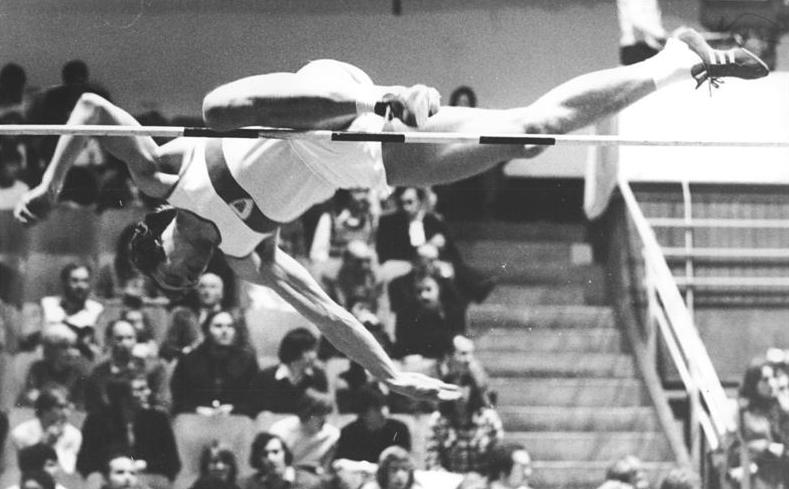
Straddle Technique

The straddle technique was the dominant style in the high jump before the development of the Fosbury Flop. It is a successor of the Western roll, for which it is sometimes confused.

Unlike the scissors or flop style of jump, where the jumper approaches the bar so as to take off from the outer foot, the straddle jumper approaches from the opposite side, so as to take off from the inner foot. In this respect, the straddle resembles the western roll. However, in the western roll the jumper's side or back faces the bar; in the straddle the jumper crosses the bar face down, with legs straddling it. With this clearance position, the straddle has a mechanical advantage over the western roll, since it is possible to clear a bar that is higher relative to the jumper's center of mass.

There are two variants of the straddle: the parallel straddle and a diving version. With the parallel straddle, the lead leg is kicked high and straight, and head and trunk pass the bar at the same time. Charles Dumas, the first high jumper to clear 2.1 metres (7 ft), and John Thomas (silver medalist at the 1964 Summer Olympics) used this technique. Valeriy Brumel (gold in 1964) dived, his head going over the bar before his trunk. Probably the most extreme exponent of the dive straddle was Bob Avant, who cleared 2.1 metres (7 ft) in 1961. Avant's technique was close to a pure dive, with just a small knee lift on his lead leg.

In 1968, an American Dick Fosbury used a new style, called the Fosbury Flop, to win the 1968 Mexico Olympics by 2.24 m (7 ft 4 in). This style spread quickly, and soon "floppers" became dominant in high jump competitions.

The last world record jump with the straddle technique was Vladimir Yashchenko's 2.34 m (7 ft 8 in) in 1978. (His best result was 2.35 m (7 ft 8 1/2 in) obtained in Milan at the 1978 European Athletics Indoor Championships). He was only 19 years old when he set the record, but a knee injury effectively ended his career the next year. Yashchenko's record was improved upon in 1980 by a flopper, Jacek Wszoła of Poland, who had already won the 1976 Montréal Olympics.

On the female side, straddle jumper Rosemarie Ackermann of East Germany raised the world record from 1.95 m (6 ft 4 3/4 in) to 2.00 m (6 ft 6 1/2 in) during 1974 to 1977, and she was the first female high jumper ever to clear 2 meters. Her record was surpassed by her long-term rival, the Italian flopper Sara Simeoni, by 1 cm in 1978. Ackermann was also the gold medalist of the 1976 Montréal Olympics, which was the last time for a straddle jumper (male or female) to win an Olympic medal.

After Yashchenko and Ackermann, all world record holders and Olympics medalists in high jump have used the flop style.

In 1993, an American high jumper Steve Harkins brought back the straddle style in the Master's division, beating a 'flopper' at the World Championships in Miyazaki, Japan. Harkins used the 'head down first' style as did Brumel. At 2.013 metres (6 ft 7 1/4 in) at the U.S. National Championships in Bozeman, Montana; in March 1993, Harkins was the last jumper ever in the Master's to have used the straddle style, breaking the World Record that day. The last significant user of the style was East German Decathlete, Christian Schenk, who retired in 1994. He cleared 2.27 m (7 ft 5 1/4 in) in the 1988 Seoul Olympics where he claimed a gold medal, and this is still the Olympic Decathlete Best in high jump.
