= Vladimir Yashchenko =

Soviet Ukrainian athlete

Personal information
- Full name: Vladimir Ilyich Yashchenko
- Born: 12 January 1959 Zaporizhzhia, Ukrainian SSR, USSR
- Died: 30 November 1999 (aged 40) Zaporizhzhia, Ukraine
- Height: 1.93 m (6 ft 4 in)
- Weight: 74 kg (163 lb)

Sport
- Sport: Track and field
- Event: High jump
- Coached by: Vasily Telegin

Achievements and titles
- Personal bests: High jump (outdoors): 2.34 m (7 ft 8 in); High jump (indoors): 2.35 m (7 ft 8 1/2 in)
Medal record
Men's athletics
Representing the Soviet Union
European Championships
Gold medal – first place	1978 Prague	High jump
European Indoor Championships
Gold medal – first place	1978 Milan	High jump
Gold medal – first place	1979 Vienna	High jump
European Junior Championships
Gold medal – first place	1977 Donetsk	High jump

Vladimir Ilyich Yashchenko (Russian: Владимир Ильич Ященко) or Volodymyr Yashchenko (Ukrainian: Володимир Ященко) (born 12 January 1959) was a Ukrainian member of the Soviet national team and former world record holder in the high jump.

Yashchenko first began competing in the high jump at age 12.

In June 1977, he jumped 2.33 m (7 ft 7 1/2 in) at the USA-USSR junior dual meet in Richmond, Virginia, breaking the previous world record of 2.32 m (7 ft 7 1/4 in) set by Dwight Stones in August 1976. In 1978, he finished in first place at the European Athletics Championships and the European Athletics Indoor Championships with heights of 2.30 m (7 ft 6 1/2 in) and 2.35 m (7 ft 8 1/2 in), respectively, while using the straddle technique.

In 1979, he suffered a severe knee injury, effectively ending his career. He died in 1999 from cirrhosis.

Records
Preceded by (United States) Dwight Stones	Men's High Jump World Record Holder; 2 June 1977 – 25 May 1980	Succeeded by (Poland) Jacek Wszoła
Sporting positions
Preceded by (United States) Dwight Stones	Men's High Jump Best Year Performance; 1977,1978(i)	Succeeded by (West Germany) Dietmar Mögenburg
