= Scissors jump =

High jump technique

The scissors is a style used in the athletics event of high jump.

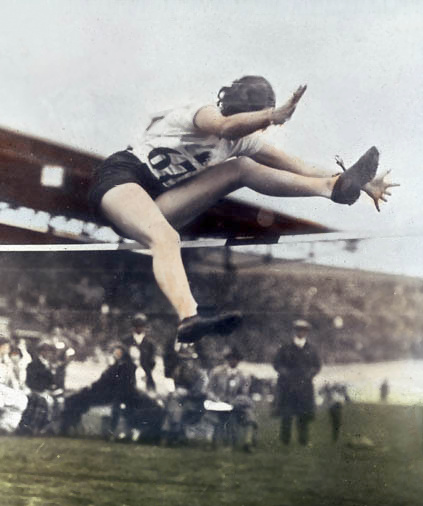
Gold medal winner Ethel Catherwood of Canada scissors over the bar at the 1928 Summer Olympics. Her winning result was 1.59 metres (5 ft 3 in).

== Description of the technique ==
As it allows jumpers to land on their feet, it is the style most often used by junior athletes where the landing surface is not deep or soft enough to meet full competition standards.

The approach (or run-up) in the scissors is a straight line at 30 to 50 degrees to the bar, jumping over the lowest point of the bar which is usually the centre. Speed is brisk, simply to ensure horizontal travel over the bar, but not a full-out sprint, as there is little chance to resolve forward motion into vertical motion at take-off. Horizontal acceleration should be complete by take-off, with the shoulders held high and the take-off leg (the outside leg in the case of the scissors style) flexing to launch the jumper into the air.

At take-off the leg nearer the bar (the lead leg) is held straight and swung into the air to clear the bar. At exactly the same time the hips and body are driven into the air by the take-off leg. As the jumper crosses the bar, the trailing or take-off leg has to be quickly swung up to clear the bar. If this occurs as the lead leg crosses and clears the bar, the lead leg can be driven downwards, helping to keep the athlete's centre of mass closer to the bar (in other words, enabling clearance of a higher bar). This up-down/up movement of the legs can best be described as a scissoring action.

Once the take-off leg has left the ground (but not before) the athlete should attempt to pull the upper body face down towards the knee, also to keep the centre of mass as close as possible to the bar. Care must be taken not to hit the head against the knee.

Driving or swinging the arms into the air at take-off provides additional upwards momentum. The arms can be brought back to the sides during clearance, as a further measure to keep the centre of mass as close as possible to the bar. Even with these measures, it is clear that the bar remains considerably below the centre of mass, so the scissors is far from an optimal clearance technique. Landing from the scissors is usually on the feet, but a landing area of soft matting or sand is desirable to reduce foot impact.

== History ==
Until the invention of the eastern cut-off by Michael Sweeney in the 1890s, high jumpers used fairly primitive variants of the basic scissors style. One of the most eminent of these early jumpers was Marshall Brooks of Oxford University, who achieved the first jump of 6 ft (1.83 m) on 17 March 1876. A few weeks later he improved this mark to 6 ft 2 1/2 inches (1.89 m). This record stood until 1880 when Patrick Davin of Ireland jumped 6 ft 2 3/4 inches (1.90 m). These jumpers ran straight at the bar in a style not unlike long-jumping with legs and hips lifted. Indeed, Davin was also holder of the world long jump record. The next world record in high jump was perhaps the first achieved with a true scissors style.

In 1887 the high jump record was captured by a US athlete, William Byrd-Page of the University of Pennsylvania, first with a clearance of 6 ft 3 1/4 inches, and later 6 ft 4 inches (1.93 m). Thereafter, all world high jump records until 1957 were set by US athletes. (For this reason, we state the records in feet and inches for greater accuracy, since that is how they were originally measured.)

Byrd-Page's record was first bettered by Michael Sweeney, inventor of the eastern cut-off mentioned above. Sweeney jumped 6 ft 5 5/8 inches in 1895, a record that stood until 1912. 1912 was the last time that the men's world record was held by a variant of the scissors style, however the women's world was held in the 1960s by the eastern cut-off jumper Iolanda Balas of Romania.

The eastern cut-off was undoubtedly the most natural and successful variation of the scissors technique. But a few jumpers achieved world-class performances with another variation, the so-called modified scissors. In the modified scissors, the upper body leans back after takeoff, leading to a layout on the back above the bar. This gives a very efficient clearance, but it made for an uncomfortable landing in the early days, when the jumper typically fell into a sandpit.

The first successful exponent of the modified scissors was Clinton Larson of Brigham University, in Provo, Utah, who was US champion in 1917. Larson is credited with an exhibition jump of 6 ft 8 inches (2.03m), which exceeded the world record of the time, held by western roller Edward Beeson. More than 30 years later, the style was reinvented by Bob Barksdale of Morgan State University in Baltimore, Maryland.

Barksdale achieved an official clearance of 6 ft 9 inches (2.05m) in early 1956, when the world record stood at 6 ft 11 1/2 inches (2.12m). His technique differed from Larson's in a small but significant way: his head slightly preceded his hips in crossing the bar. In Larson's time there was a "no diving" rule which disallowed such a jump. When the rule was repealed, in the late 1930s, the main result was the development of "dive" variants of the western roll and straddle techniques. But it also opened the possibility of a "back dive" scissors, and Barksdale's technique was a first step in that direction.

A full-blown "back dive scissors" is none other than the Fosbury flop, used almost universally today (though of course the "scissors" part has essentially vanished). In a nice recapitulation of high jump history, flop jumpers sometimes use the scissors when warming up. For a good example, see the video of Stefan Holm nonchalantly scissoring over 2.10m while still wearing his track suit, or Mutaz Barshim over 2.16m at training.
