= Michael Sweeney (athlete) =

Irish-American track and field athlete

Michael Sweeney performing a high jump (top) and long jump (bottom), in motion studies by Étienne-Jules Marey

Michael Sweeney (born 27 October 1872) was an Irish-American track and field athlete. He was the high jumping world champion in 1892 and 1895. He was also the professional athletics champion at the 1900 Paris Olympics in the 100-meter dash, the high jump, and the long jump.

He was the holder of the world high jump record at 1.97 m, and known as an innovator in the progress of high jump technique through his development of the eastern cut-off style. After his high jumping career, Sweeney became a track and field coach at Yale, as well as at The Hill School.

Records
| Preceded by (United States) George R. Fearing | Men's High Jump Indoor World Record Holder; February 10, 1894 – February 9, 1912 | Succeeded by (United States) Samuel Lawrence |
