= Western roll =

High jump technique

The Western roll is a high jump technique invented by George Horine of Stanford University. This technique was succeeded by the straddle.

== History ==
It is said that George Horine invented the Western roll because the high jump pit at Stanford could be approached from only one side. Another, perhaps more plausible, explanation is that the style was invented by the Stanford coach Edward Moulton. However, neither of these stories occurs in a detailed contemporary profile of Horine, which states that Horine arrived at the style himself after many months of experimentation. The style was controversial at first, partly because of rivalry between the US East and West Coasts (hence the label "Western" given to Horine's style). The initial objections, due to the "no diving" rule then in force, were overcome by the development of a Western roll style in which the lead foot precedes the head in crossing the bar. Another Western athlete, Alma Richards of Utah, won the 1912 Olympic high jump using a Western roll with a more frontal, feet-first, approach.

While the "no diving" rule was still in force, the world high jump record was captured by a series of Western roll jumpers: George Horine (1912, 6 ft 7 in (2.01 m)), Edward Beeson (1914), Harold Osborn (1924), Walter Marty (1933), and Cornelius Johnson (1936). Johnson's record, (6 ft 9.75 in (2.0765 m)), was equaled on the same day by Dave Albritton, the first world record holder to use what is now called the straddle technique. At first, the straddle was viewed as just a variation of the Western roll, and indeed video of the 1936 Olympics shows Albritton using a conventional Western roll at lower heights. The straddle did not come to dominate the high jump until the mid-1950s, by which time it was recognized as a separate style. Walt Davis was the last Western roll jumper to hold the world record, jumping 6 ft 11.5 in (2.12 m) in 1953. The Western roll began to disappear when Charles Dumas used the straddle technique to make the first 7 ft (2.13 m) jump in 1956.

== Impact ==
The Western roll was the catalyst for two changes in the rules of high jumping.

The first was in high jump equipment. Until the 1930s, the high jump bar rested on two pegs that projected from the back of the uprights. Consequently, the jumper could hit the bar quite hard without dislodging it, by pressing it back against the uprights. This was scarcely possible for scissors jumpers, but easily possible with the Western roll. This loophole was exploited by Harold Osborn, among others. As a result, high jump equipment was changed to ensure that the bar could be dislodged both backwards and forwards.

The other change was in the "no diving" rule, which was repealed shortly after the world record jumps of Johnson and Albritton, allowing the head to cross the bar before the feet. This led to a "dive" version of the western roll, which was used by the next world record holder Melvin Walker in 1937 and also by Walt Davis.

== Description ==
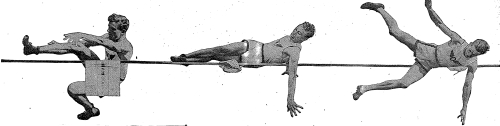

The crucial difference between the Western roll and the various scissors styles that preceded it is in the direction of approach—from the opposite side, so that the takeoff leg is the one nearer to the bar. The lead leg is usually kicked up vigorously, lifting the body into a layout on the side or back above the bar, with the trailing leg folded beneath the lead leg. After the bar has been crossed, the body rotates to face the ground, and the trail leg drops to enable a three-point landing on it and the hands.

The Western roll was a competitive high jump style for a long time because it was easy to learn and more efficient (allowing clearance of a bar that is closer to the height of the center of mass) than all but the most contorted variants of the scissors. It also enabled a comfortable landing in the crude sand pits provided for high jumpers up until the 1950s. However, the technique is less efficient than the straddle technique, a style that evolved from the Western roll when the rotation of the body was increased to the point where the bar was crossed face down.
