= Charles Dumas =

American high jumper

Medal record

Men's Athletics

Representing the United States

Olympic Games
Gold medal – first place	1956 Melbourne	High Jump

Pan American Games
Gold medal – first place	1959 Chicago	High Jump

Charles Everett "Charlie" Dumas (February 12, 1937 – January 5, 2004) was an American high jumper, the 1956 Olympic champion, and the first person to clear 7 ft.(2.13 m)

== Biography ==
Dumas started his jumping career as a student first at Thomas Jefferson High School in South Central Los Angeles for 2 years. As a sophomore, he finished tied for 4th place at the 1953 CIF California State Meet for Jefferson. As a junior and senior he jumped for Centennial High School in Compton finishing second in 1954 and winning the state championship by four and a half inches in 1955. He was Track and Field News "High School Athlete of the Year" in 1955.

While attending Compton College, near Los Angeles, Dumas, from Tulsa, Oklahoma, made his memorable jump on June 29, 1956, in the US Olympic Trials in Los Angeles, breaking a barrier previously thought unbreakable.

This jump not only ensured him of a place in the American Olympic team, but also made him the top favorite for the gold medal at the 1956 Summer Olympics in Melbourne. He did not disappoint, and grabbed the title in a new Olympic Record.

Next, he enrolled at the University of Southern California, winning the NCAA track and field title with the university team in 1958. In 1960, Dumas competed in the 1960 Summer Olympics in Rome, but a knee injury during the competition prevented him from winning a second medal, finishing 6th.

After his career, in which he won five consecutive national high jump titles, Dumas became a teacher, working at several schools in the Los Angeles area (including Jordan High School in Watts).

He died of cancer at age 66 in Inglewood, California. He left behind three children: Keasha, Kyle and Ianna.

Records
Preceded by (United States) Walt Davis	Men's High Jump World Record Holder; 1956-06-29 — 1957-07-13	Succeeded by (Soviet Union) Yuriy Stepanov
