= 1968 European Indoor Games – Men's high jump =

French publishing award

The men's high jump event at the 1968 European Indoor Games was held on 10 March in Madrid.

== Results ==
| Rank | Name | Nationality | Result | Notes |
|---|---|---|---|---|
| 1st place, gold medalist(s) | Valeriy Skvortsov | Soviet Union | 2.17 | |
| 2nd place, silver medalist(s) | Valentin Gavrilov | Soviet Union | 2.17 | |
| 3rd place, bronze medalist(s) | Kenneth Lundmark | Sweden | 2.14 | |
| 4 | Rudolf Hübner | Czechoslovakia | 2.14 | |
| 5 | Ingomar Sieghart | West Germany | 2.11 | |
| 6 | Bo Jonsson | Sweden | 2.11 | |
| 7 | Rudolf Baudis | Czechoslovakia | 2.11 | |
| 8 | Robert Sainte-Rose | France | 2.08 | |
| 9 | Luis María Garriga | Spain | 2.08 | |
| 10 | Edward Czernik | Poland | 2.08 | |
| 11 | Polde Milek | Yugoslavia | 2.08 | |
| 12 | Sven Breum | Denmark | 2.08 | |
| 13 | Miodrag Todosijević | Yugoslavia | 2.08 | |
| 14 | Gunther Spielvogel | West Germany | 2.05 | |
| 15 | Erminio Azzaro | Italy | 2.05 | |
| 16 | Șerban Ioan | Romania | 2.05 | |
| 17 | Michel Portmann | Switzerland | 2.05 | |
| 18 | Jacques Madubost | France | 2.05 | |
| 19 | Nurullah Candan | Turkey | 1.85 | |
