= 1966 European Athletics Championships – Men's high jump =

Men's high jump at the European Athletics Championships

The men's high jump at the 1966 European Athletics Championships was held in Budapest, Hungary, at Népstadion on 31 August and 1 September 1966.

== Medalists ==
Gold	Jacques Madubost; France
Silver	Robert Sainte-Rose; France
Bronze	Valeriy Skvortsov; Soviet Union

== Results ==
=== Final ===
1 September

Rank	Name	Nationality	Result	Notes
1st place, gold medalist(s)	Jacques Madubost	France	2.12	
2nd place, silver medalist(s)	Robert Sainte-Rose	France	2.12	
3rd place, bronze medalist(s)	Valeriy Skvortsov	Soviet Union	2.09	
4	Edward Czernik	Poland	2.06	
5	Andrey Khmarskiy	Soviet Union	2.06	
6	Wolfgang Schillkowski	West Germany	2.06	
7	Valentin Gavrilov	Soviet Union	2.06	
8	Kjell-Åke Nilsson	Sweden	2.03	
8	Ingomar Sieghart	West Germany	2.03	
10	János Medovarszki	Hungary	2.03	
10	Jan Dahlgren	Sweden	2.03	
12	Bo Jonsson	Sweden	2.03	
13	Yevgeni Yordanov	Bulgaria	1.95	

=== Qualification ===
31 August

Rank	Name	Nationality	Result	Notes
	Ingomar Sieghart	West Germany	2.06	Q
	Wolfgang Schillkowski	West Germany	2.03	Q
	Valeriy Skvortsov	Soviet Union	2.03	Q
	Valentin Gavrilov	Soviet Union	2.03	Q
	Kjell-Åke Nilsson	Sweden	2.03	Q
	Robert Sainte-Rose	France	2.03	Q
	Bo Jonsson	Sweden	2.03	Q
	Jan Dahlgren	Sweden	2.03	Q
	János Medovarszki	Hungary	2.03	Q
	Jacques Madubost	France	2.03	Q
	Andrey Khmarskiy	Soviet Union	2.03	Q
	Yevgeni Yordanov	Bulgaria	2.03	Q
	Edward Czernik	Poland	2.03	Q
	Sándor Noszály	Hungary	2.00	
	Rudolf Hübner	Czechoslovakia	2.00	
	Gilbert Vallaeys	France	2.00	
	Werner Pfeil	East Germany	2.00	
	Milan Haranta	Czechoslovakia	2.00	
	Rudolf Baudis	Czechoslovakia	2.00	
	Jón Þordur Ólafsson	Iceland	1.95	
	Luis Garriga	Spain	1.95	
	Erminio Azzaro	Italy	1.95	
	Gunther Spielvogel	West Germany	1.95	
	Ilia Mazniku	Albania	1.85	

== Participation ==
According to an unofficial count, 24 athletes from 13 countries participated in the event.

- Albania (1)
- Bulgaria (1)
- Czechoslovakia (3)
- East Germany (1)
- France (3)
- Hungary (2)
- Iceland (1)
- Italy (1)
- Poland (1)
- Soviet Union (3)
- Spain (1)
- Sweden (3)
- West Germany (3)
