= 1966 European Indoor Games – Men's high jump =

The men's high jump event at the 1966 European Indoor Games was held on 27 March in Dortmund.

== Results ==
Rank	Name	Nationality	Result	Notes
1st place, gold medalist(s)	Valeriy Skvortsov	Soviet Union	2.17	
2nd place, silver medalist(s)	Wolfgang Schillkowski	West Germany	2.11	
3rd place, bronze medalist(s)	Kjell-Åke Nilsson	Sweden	2.08	
4	Rudolf Baudis	Czechoslovakia	2.08	
5	Ingomar Sieghart	West Germany	2.05	
6	Branko Vivod	Yugoslavia	2.05	
7	Jón Ólafsson	Iceland	2.00	
8	Benny Andreassen	Denmark	2.00	
9	René Maurer	Switzerland	2.00	
10	Robert Sainte-Rose	France	2.00	
11	Christian Le Hérissé	France	2.00	
12	Erminio Azzaro	Italy	2.00	
13	Rudolf Hübner	Czechoslovakia	1.95	
14	Mauro Bogliatto	Italy	1.90	
