= 1970 European Athletics Indoor Championships – Men's high jump =

The men's high jump event at the 1970 European Athletics Indoor Championships was held on 15 March in Vienna.

== Results ==
Rank	Name	Nationality	Result	Notes
1st place, gold medalist(s)	Valentin Gavrilov	Soviet Union	2.20	
2nd place, silver medalist(s)	Gerd Dührkop	East Germany	2.17	
3rd place, bronze medalist(s)	Șerban Ioan	Romania	2.17	
4	Sergey Mospanov	Soviet Union	2.14	
5	Luis María Garriga	Spain	2.14	
6	Valeriy Skvortsov	Soviet Union	2.14	
7	Wojciech Gołębiowski	Poland	2.11	
8	Thomas Zacharias	West Germany	2.11	
9	Zbyněk Kužela	Czechoslovakia	2.11	
10	Reijo Vähälä	Finland	2.11	
11	István Major	Hungary	2.08	
12	Jan Dahlgren	Sweden	2.08	
13	Michel Portmann	Switzerland	2.05	
14	Freddy Herbrand	Belgium	2.00	
14	David Wilson	Great Britain	2.00	
16	Bernard Gauthier	France	2.00	
17	Nurullah Candan	Turkey	1.95	
18	Horst Mandl	Austria	1.95	
