= Athletics at the 1972 Summer Olympics – Men's high jump =

Men's high jump at the Games of the XX Olympiad
- Olympic Athletics
- Venue: Olympic Stadium
- Dates: September 9 & 10, 1972
- Competitors: 40 from 26 nations
- Winning height: 2.23

Medalists
| 1st place, gold medalist(s) | | Jüri Tarmak; Soviet Union |
| 2nd place, silver medalist(s) | | Stefan Junge; East Germany |
| 3rd place, bronze medalist(s) | | Dwight Stones; United States |

The men's high jump field event at the 1972 Olympic Games took place on September 9 and 10 at the Olympiastadion in Munich, Germany. Forty athletes from 26 nations competed. The maximum number of athletes per nation had been set at 3 since the 1930 Olympic Congress. The event was won by Jüri Tarmak of the Soviet Union; he was the last man to win an Olympic gold medal using the straddle technique. The more popular and more widely used Fosbury Flop technique was the most common technique used.

Tarmak's win was the Soviet Union's third victory in the men's high jump. The Soviet Union reached the podium for the fifth consecutive time, while the United States did so for the 17th consecutive time with Dwight Stones's bronze. East Germany won its first men's high jump medal, in its first appearance, with Stefan Junge's silver. It was the first time since 1956 that an athlete from outside the United States and Soviet Union reached the podium.

== Background ==
This was the 17th appearance of the event, which is one of 12 athletics events to have been held at every Summer Olympics. The returning finalists from the 1968 Games were eighth-place finisher Lawrie Peckham of Australia (also a 1964 finalist), ninth-place finisher Ingomar Sieghart of West Germany, and twelfth-place finisher Ahmed Senoussi of Chad. The top jumper of the previous year, world record holder and winner of the Pan American Games, was Pat Matzdorf from the United States. But in a surprise, he failed to make the US team, leaving the field wide open.

Cambodia, Cameroon, Iran, South Korea, Malawi, and Somalia each made their debut in the event; East Germany competed separately for the first time. The United States appeared for the 17th time, having competed at each edition of the Olympic men's high jump to that point.

== Competition format ==
The competition used the two-round format introduced in 1912. There were two distinct rounds of jumping with results cleared between rounds. The qualifying round had the bar set at 1.80 metres, 1.90 metres, 2.00 metres, 2.06 metres, 2.09 metres, 2.12 metres, and 2.15 metres. All jumpers clearing 2.15 metres in the qualifying round advanced to the final. If fewer than 12 jumpers could achieve it, the top 12 (including ties) would advance to the final.

The final had jumps at 1.90 metres, 2.00 metres, 2.05 metres, 2.10 metres, 2.15 metres, 2.18 metres, 2.21 metres, and 2.23 metres.

== Records ==
Prior to this competition, the existing world and Olympic records were as follows.

| World record | Pat Matzdorf (USA) | 2.29 | Berkeley, United States | 3 July 1971 |
| Olympic record | Dick Fosbury (USA) | 2.24 | Mexico City, Mexico | 20 October 1968 |

No new world or Olympic records were set during the competition.

== Schedule ==
All times are Central European Time (UTC+1)

| Date | Time | Round |
|---|---|---|
| Saturday, 9 September 1972 | 10:00 | Qualifying |
| Sunday, 10 September 1972 | 15:00 | Final |

== Results ==
Key

- o = Height cleared
- x = Height failed
- – = Height passed
- r = Retired
- SB = Season's best
- PB = Personal best
- NR = National record
- AR = Area record
- OR = Olympic record
- WR = World record
- WL = World lead
- NM = No mark
- DNS = Did not start
- DQ = Disqualified

Top 12 and ties and all jumpers clearing 2.15 m (7 ft 1/2 in) advanced to the finals. All heights are listed in metres.

=== Qualifying ===
| Rank | Athlete | Nation | Group | 1.80 | 1.90 | 2.00 | 2.06 | 2.09 | 2.12 | 2.15 | Height | Notes |
|---|---|---|---|---|---|---|---|---|---|---|---|---|
| 1 | Henry Elliott | France | A | — | — | — | o | o | o | o | 2.15 | Q |
| 1 | Dwight Stones | United States | A | — | — | — | o | o | o | o | 2.15 | Q |
| 3 | Vasilios Papadimitriou | Greece | A | — | — | o | o | o | o | o | 2.15 | Q |
| 3 | István Major | Hungary | A | — | — | o | o | o | o | o | 2.15 | Q |
| 3 | Ádám Szepesi | Hungary | A | — | — | o | o | o | o | o | 2.15 | Q |
| 3 | Enzo Del Forno | Italy | B | — | — | o | o | o | o | o | 2.15 | Q |
| 3 | Șerban Ioan | Romania | A | — | — | o | o | o | o | o | 2.15 | Q |
| 3 | Jan Dahlgren | Sweden | A | — | — | o | o | o | o | o | 2.15 | Q |
| 3 | Rustam Akhmetov | Soviet Union | A | — | — | o | o | o | o | o | 2.15 | Q |
| 3 | Kęstutis Šapka | Soviet Union | A | — | — | o | o | o | o | o | 2.15 | Q |
| 3 | Jüri Tarmak | Soviet Union | A | — | — | o | o | o | o | o | 2.15 | Q |
| 12 | Hermann Magerl | West Germany | A | — | — | — | o | — | xo | o | 2.15 | Q |
| 13 | John Beers | Canada | B | — | — | xo | o | o | xo | o | 2.15 | Q |
| 14 | John Hawkins | Canada | B | — | — | o | o | o | o | xo | 2.15 | Q |
| 14 | Bernard Gauthier | France | A | — | — | o | o | o | o | xo | 2.15 | Q |
| 16 | Stefan Junge | East Germany | A | — | — | o | o | — | xxo | xo | 2.15 | Q |
| 17 | Lawrie Peckham | Australia | A | — | — | o | o | xxo | o | xo | 2.15 | Q |
| 18 | Hidehiko Tomizawa | Japan | A | — | — | xo | o | o | xxo | xxo | 2.15 | Q |
| 19 | Gian Marco Schivo | Italy | A | — | o | o | xo | o | xxo | xxo | 2.15 | Q |
| 20 | Chris Dunn | United States | A | — | — | — | o | — | o | xxx | 2.12 | |
| 21 | Roman Moravec | Czechoslovakia | A | — | — | o | o | o | o | xxx | 2.12 | |
| 22 | Ron Jourdan | United States | A | — | o | o | o | o | o | xxx | 2.12 | |
| 23 | Petar Bogdanov | Bulgaria | A | — | — | o | o | o | xo | xxx | 2.12 | |
| 24 | Ingomar Sieghart | West Germany | B | — | o | o | o | xo | xo | xxx | 2.12 | |
| 25 | Teymour Ghiassi | Iran | B | — | — | o | o | o | xxo | xxx | 2.12 | |
| 26 | Ioannis Kousoulas | Greece | B | — | o | o | o | xxo | xxo | xxx | 2.12 | |
| 27 | József Tihanyi | Hungary | A | — | — | o | o | o | xxx | — | 2.09 | |
| 28 | Rick Cuttell | Canada | B | — | — | xo | xo | o | xxx | — | 2.09 | |
| 29 | Jaroslav Alexa | Czechoslovakia | A | — | — | o | o | xo | xxx | — | 2.09 | |
| 30 | Michel Patry | Switzerland | B | — | o | xo | o | xo | — | xxx | 2.09 | |
| 31 | Kuniyoshi Sugioka | Japan | B | — | — | o | o | xxx | — | | 2.06 | |
| 32 | Park Sang-su | South Korea | B | — | o | o | xxx | — | | | 2.00 | |
| 33 | Noor Azhar Hamid | Singapore | B | o | o | o | xxx | — | | | 2.00 | |
| 33 | Abdullah Noor Wasughe | Somalia | B | o | o | o | xxx | — | | | 2.00 | |
| 35 | Ahmed Senoussi | Chad | B | — | — | xo | xxx | — | | | 2.00 | |
| 36 | Luis Barrionuevo | Argentina | B | — | o | xxx | — | | | | 1.90 | |
| 36 | Sitha Sin | Khmer Republic | B | — | o | xxx | — | | | | 1.90 | |
| 36 | Daniel Mkandawire | Malawi | B | — | o | xxx | — | | | | 1.90 | |
| 39 | Hamadou Evelé | Cameroon | B | — | xo | xxx | — | | | | 1.90 | |
| 40 | Suresh Babu | India | B | — | xxo | xxx | — | | | | 1.90 | |
| — | Leif Falkum | Norway | B | DNS | | | | | | | | |
| — | Irolan Hechavarria | Cuba | B | DNS | | | | | | | | |
| — | Bogusław Białek | Poland | B | DNS | | | | | | | | |

=== Final ===
| Rank | Athlete | Nation | 2.00 | 2.05 | 2.10 | 2.15 | 2.18 | 2.21 | 2.23 | 2.26 | Height |
|---|---|---|---|---|---|---|---|---|---|---|---|
| 1st place, gold medalist(s) | Jüri Tarmak | Soviet Union | — | — | o | o | o | xo | xo | xxx | 2.23 |
| 2nd place, silver medalist(s) | Stefan Junge | East Germany | — | xo | o | o | o | xo | xxx | — | 2.21 |
| 3rd place, bronze medalist(s) | Dwight Stones | United States | — | — | o | o | o | xxo | xxx | — | 2.21 |
| 4 | Hermann Magerl | West Germany | — | o | o | xo | o | xxx | — | | 2.18 |
| 5 | Ádám Szepesi | Hungary | o | o | o | o | xxo | xxx | — | | 2.18 |
| 6 | John Beers | Canada | — | o | o | o | xxx | — | | | 2.15 |
| 6 | István Major | Hungary | — | o | o | o | xxx | — | | | 2.15 |
| 8 | Rustam Akhmetov | Soviet Union | o | o | o | o | xxx | — | | | 2.15 |
| 9 | John Hawkins | Canada | — | o | xo | o | xxx | — | | | 2.15 |
| 10 | Enzo Del Forno | Italy | o | o | o | xo | xxx | — | | | 2.15 |
| 11 | Jan Dahlgren | Sweden | — | o | xo | xo | xxx | — | | | 2.15 |
| 12 | Vasilios Papadimitriou | Greece | — | o | o | xxo | xxx | — | | | 2.15 |
| 12 | Kęstutis Šapka | Soviet Union | — | o | o | xxo | xxx | — | | | 2.15 |
| 14 | Bernard Gauthier | France | o | o | xo | xxo | xxx | — | | | 2.15 |
| 15 | Henry Elliott | France | — | — | o | — | xxx | — | | | 2.10 |
| 16 | Șerban Ioan | Romania | o | — | o | xxx | — | | | | 2.10 |
| 17 | Gian Marco Schivo | Italy | — | o | xo | xxx | — | | | | 2.10 |
| 18 | Lawrie Peckham | Australia | o | o | xo | xxx | — | | | | 2.10 |
| 19 | Hidehiko Tomizawa | Japan | xo | o | xxx | — | | | | | 2.05 |
