= Athletics at the 1965 Summer Universiade – Men's high jump =

The men's high jump event at the 1965 Summer Universiade was held at the People's Stadium in Budapest on 27 August 1965.

== Medalists ==
Gold	Silver	Bronze
Valeriy Skvortsov; Soviet Union	Edward Czernik; Poland	János Medovarszki; Hungary; Kuniyoshi Sugioka; Japan

== Results ==
=== Qualification ===
Rank	Group	Name	Nationality	Result	Notes
?	?	Mauro Bogliatto	Italy	1.90	
?	?	Wolfgang Spinnler	West Germany	1.90	
?	?	Kuniyoshi Sugioka	Japan	1.90	
?	?	Pierre Schoebel	France	1.90	
?	?	Jan Veselý	Czechoslovakia	1.90	
?	?	Björn Svedman	Sweden	1.90	
?	?	Miodrag Todosijević	Yugoslavia	1.90	
?	?	Igor Matveyev	Soviet Union	1.90	
?	?	Sándor Noszály	Hungary	1.90	
?	?	Eugen Ducu	Romania	1.90	
?	?	Andrzej Maciejewski	Poland	1.90	
?	?	Edward Czernik	Poland	1.90	
?	?	János Medovarszki	Hungary	1.90	
?	?	Guy Guezille	France	1.90	
?	?	Valeriy Skvortsov	Soviet Union	1.90	
?	?	Herbert Janko	Austria	1.85	
?	?	Steve Spencer	Canada	1.85	
?	?	Helmut Donner	Austria	1.85	
?	?	Peter Riebensahm	West Germany	1.85	
?	?	Mike Colin Campbell	Great Britain	1.85	

=== Final ===
Rank	Name	Nationality	Result	Notes
1st place, gold medalist(s)	Valeriy Skvortsov	Soviet Union	2.14	
2nd place, silver medalist(s)	Edward Czernik	Poland	2.07	
3rd place, bronze medalist(s)	János Medovarszki	Hungary	2.07	
3rd place, bronze medalist(s)	Kuniyoshi Sugioka	Japan	2.07	
5	Igor Matveyev	Soviet Union	2.04	
5	Miodrag Todosijević	Yugoslavia	2.04	
7	Jan Veselý	Czechoslovakia	2.00	
7	Sándor Noszály	Hungary	2.00	
9	Wolfgang Spinnler	West Germany	2.00	
10	Andrzej Maciejewski	Poland	1.95	
11	Mauro Bogliatto	Italy	1.95	
12	Guy Guézille	France	1.95	
13	Björn Svedman	Sweden	1.95	
14	Pierre Schoebel	France	1.95	
15	Eugen Ducu	Romania	1.90	
