= Athletics at the 1968 Summer Olympics – Men's high jump =

Men's high jump at the Games of the XIX Olympiad
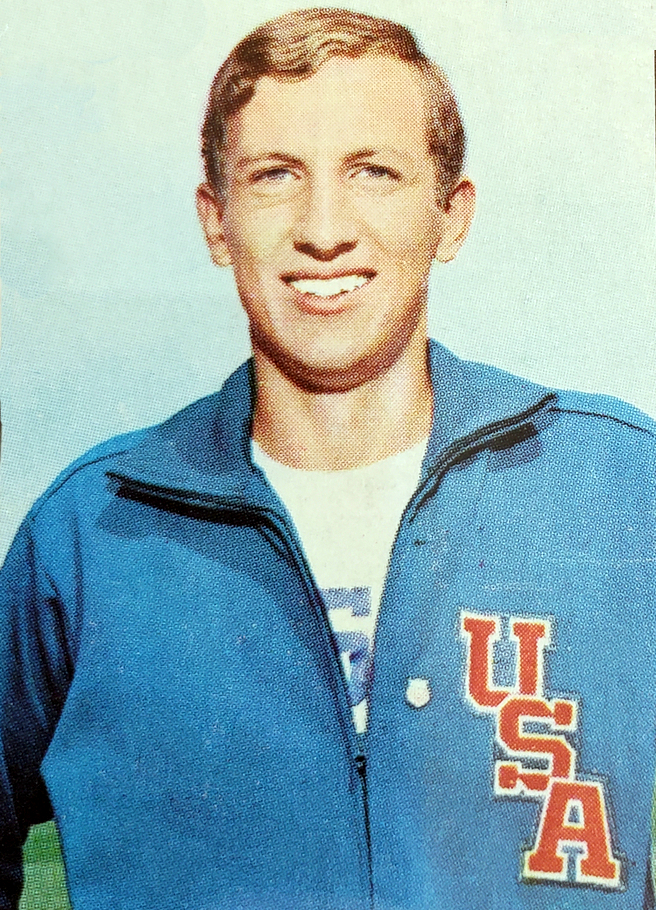
- Dick Fosbury
- Venue: Estadio Olímpico Universitario
- Dates: October 19–20, 1968
- Competitors: 39 from 25 nations
- Winning height: 2.24 OR

Medalists
| 1st place, gold medalist(s) | | Dick Fosbury; United States |
| 2nd place, silver medalist(s) | | Ed Caruthers; United States |
| 3rd place, bronze medalist(s) | | Valentin Gavrilov; Soviet Union |

Official Video Highlights

The men's high jump was one of four men's jumping events on the Athletics at the 1968 Summer Olympics program in Mexico City. Thirty-nine athletes from 25 nations competed. The maximum number of athletes per nation had been set at 3 since the 1930 Olympic Congress. Dick Fosbury won by using a backward jumping style that was called the Fosbury Flop. This was the unveiling of the new style on the world stage. The style completely revolutionized the sport. By the mid 1970s and ever since, virtually all of the top competitors were using the new style.

For the third straight Games, the podium in the men's high jump was monopolized by Americans and Soviets. Fosbury's gold was the United States' 12th victory in the event. His teammate Ed Caruthers took silver. Valentin Gavrilov's bronze put the Soviet Union on the podium for the fourth straight Games, second only to the United States with 16 consecutive podium appearances.

== Summary ==
At 2.18 metres, high school 'phenomena', Reynaldo Brown and Valery Skvortsov topped out leaving the three medalists Valentin Gavrilov, Ed Caruthers and Richard Fosbury. The medalists were all clean at 2.20 metres. Fosbury took the lead by remaining clean at 2.22 metres, Caruthers needing a second attempt. Garilov could not make it. Richard Fosbury established his win by jumping over 2.24 metres on his last attempt, while Caruthers brushed his last attempt off.

== Background ==
This was the 16th appearance of the event, which is one of 12 athletics events to have been held at every Summer Olympics. The returning finalists from the 1964 Games were eighth-place finisher Ed Caruthers of the United States, ninth-place finisher Mahamat Idriss of Chad (also a finalist in 1960), tenth-place finisher Lawrie Peckham and thirteenth-place finisher Anthony Sneazwell of Australia, and fourteenth-place finisher Valeriy Skvortsov of the Soviet Union. His teammate Viktor Bolshov, who had placed fourth in 1960, also returned.

The Bahamas, Guatemala, Madagascar, and Sierra Leone each made their debut in the event; West Germany competed separately for the first time. The United States appeared for the 16th time, having competed at each edition of the Olympic men's high jump to that point.

== Competition format ==
The competition used the two-round format introduced in 1912. There were two distinct rounds of jumping with results cleared between rounds. The qualifying round had the bar set at 1.80 metres, 1.85 metres, 1.90 metres, 1.95 metres, 2.00 metres, 2.03 metres, 2.06 metres, 2.09 metres, 2.12 metres, and 2.14 metres. All jumpers clearing 2.14 metres in the qualifying round advanced to the final. For the first time, the qualifying mark was set high enough that fewer than 12 jumpers could achieve it; the top 12 (including ties) therefore advanced to the final.

The final had jumps at 2.00 metres, 2.03 metres, 2.06 metres, 2.09 metres, 2.12 metres, and then increased by 0.02 metres until a winner was found. Each athlete had three attempts at each height.

== Records ==
Prior to this competition, the existing world and Olympic records were as follows.

| World record | Valeriy Brumel (URS) | 2.28 | Moscow, Soviet Union | 21 July 1963 |
| Olympic record | Valeriy Brumel (URS); John Thomas (USA) | 2.18 | Tokyo, Japan | 21 October 1964 |

Dick Fosbury and Ed Caruthers matched the Olympic record at 2.18 metres; Valentin Gavrilov skipped that height. The three men all successfully jumped 2.20 metres, breaking the old record. Fosbury and Caruthers also succeeded at 2.22 metres. Only Fosbury made it over 2.24 metres, setting the new record. He took three attempts at 2.29 metres in an attempt to break the world record, but did not prevail.

== Schedule ==
All times are Central Standard Time (UTC-6)

| Date | Time | Round |
|---|---|---|
| Saturday, 19 October 1968 | 10:00 | Qualifying |
| Sunday, 20 October 1968 | 14:30 | Final |

== Results ==
Key

- o = Height cleared
- x = Height failed
- – = Height passed
- r = Retired
- SB = Season's best
- PB = Personal best
- NR = National record
- AR = Area record
- OR = Olympic record
- WR = World record
- WL = World lead
- NM = No mark
- DNS = Did not start
- DQ = Disqualified

=== Qualifying ===
| Rank | Athlete | Nation | 1.80 | 1.85 | 1.90 | 1.95 | 2.00 | 2.03 | 2.06 | 2.09 | 2.12 | 2.14 | Height | Notes |
|---|---|---|---|---|---|---|---|---|---|---|---|---|---|---|
| 1 | Dick Fosbury | United States | — | — | — | — | — | o | — | o | — | o | 2.14 | Q |
| 2 | Ed Caruthers | United States | — | — | — | — | — | o | o | — | o | o | 2.14 | Q |
| 3 | Valeriy Skvortsov | Soviet Union | — | — | — | — | o | — | o | o | xo | o | 2.14 | Q |
| 4 | Ahmed Senoussi | Chad | — | — | — | — | — | — | o | o | o | xo | 2.14 | Q |
| 5 | Giacomo Crosa | Italy | — | — | — | — | o | — | o | o | o | xo | 2.14 | Q |
| 6 | Lawrie Peckham | Australia | — | — | — | o | o | — | o | o | o | xo | 2.14 | Q |
| 7 | Miodrag Todosijević | Yugoslavia | — | — | — | — | o | — | o | o | o | xxx | 2.12 | q |
| 8 | Ingomar Sieghart | West Germany | — | — | — | — | o | o | o | o | o | xxx | 2.12 | q |
| 9 | Reynaldo Brown | United States | — | — | — | — | — | — | xo | — | o | xxx | 2.12 | q |
| 10 | Valentin Gavrilov | Soviet Union | — | — | — | — | o | xo | o | o | o | xxx | 2.12 | q |
| 11 | Luis María Garriga | Spain | — | — | — | xo | — | o | xo | o | o | xxx | 2.12 | q |
| 12 | Robert Sainte-Rose | France | — | — | — | — | o | — | o | o | xo | xxx | 2.12 | q |
| 13 | Gunther Spielvogel | West Germany | — | — | — | — | o | o | o | o | xo | xxx | 2.12 | q |
| 14 | Thomas Zacharias | West Germany | — | — | — | — | — | — | o | o | xxx | —N/a | 2.09 | |
| 15 | Kuniyoshi Sugioka | Japan | — | — | — | o | o | — | o | o | xxx | —N/a | 2.09 | |
| 16 | Viktor Bolshov | Soviet Union | — | — | — | — | o | — | xo | xo | xxx | —N/a | 2.09 | |
| 17 | Bhim Singh | India | — | — | — | o | o | xo | o | xo | xxx | —N/a | 2.09 | |
| 18 | Henry Elliott | France | — | — | — | — | o | — | o | xxo | xxx | —N/a | 2.09 | |
| 18 | Jaroslav Alexa | Czechoslovakia | — | — | — | — | o | — | o | xxo | xxx | —N/a | 2.09 | |
| 20 | Ioannis Kousoulas | Greece | — | — | — | — | o | xo | o | xxo | xxx | —N/a | 2.09 | |
| 21 | Mahamat Idriss | Chad | — | — | — | — | — | — | o | — | xxx | —N/a | 2.06 | |
| 22 | Tony Sneazwell | Australia | — | — | — | o | o | — | o | xxx | —N/a | | 2.06 | |
| 22 | Teodoro Palacios | Guatemala | — | — | — | o | — | o | o | xxx | —N/a | | 2.06 | |
| 22 | Kenneth Lundmark | Sweden | — | — | — | — | o | o | o | xxx | —N/a | | 2.06 | |
| 22 | Rudolf Hübner | Czechoslovakia | — | — | — | — | o | o | o | xxx | —N/a | | 2.06 | |
| 26 | Peter Boyce | Australia | — | — | — | o | xo | — | xo | xxx | —N/a | | 2.06 | |
| 27 | Jón Ólafsson | Iceland | — | — | — | o | xo | xxo | xo | xxx | —N/a | | 2.06 | |
| 28 | Michel Portmann | Switzerland | — | — | — | — | o | — | xxo | xxx | —N/a | | 2.06 | |
| 29 | Fernando Abugattás | Peru | — | — | — | — | xo | — | xxx | —N/a | | | 2.03 | |
| 30 | Fernand Tovondray | Madagascar | — | — | — | o | xxo | o | xxx | —N/a | | | 2.03 | |
| 31 | Thomas Wieser | Switzerland | — | — | — | o | o | xo | xxx | —N/a | | | 2.03 | |
| 32 | Csaba Dosa | Romania | — | o | o | o | xxo | xxo | xxx | —N/a | | | 2.03 | |
| 33 | Wilf Wedmann | Canada | — | — | — | — | o | — | xxx | —N/a | | | 2.00 | |
| 33 | Polde Milek | Yugoslavia | — | — | — | — | o | — | xxx | —N/a | | | 2.00 | |
| 35 | Roberto Abugattás | Peru | — | — | — | — | xo | — | xxx | —N/a | | | 2.00 | |
| 36 | Anthony Balfour | Bahamas | — | o | o | o | xxx | —N/a | | | | | 1.95 | |
| 37 | Hong Son-long | Taiwan | o | o | xxo | o | xxx | —N/a | | | | | 1.95 | |
| 38 | Nurullah Candan | Turkey | xxo | o | xxo | o | xxx | —N/a | | | | | 1.95 | |
| 39 | Marconi Turay | Sierra Leone | o | o | xxo | xxx | —N/a | | | | | | 1.90 | |
| — | Bo-Sven Jonsson | Sweden | DNS | | | | | | | | | | | |
| — | Jan-Erik Dahlgren | Sweden | DNS | | | | | | | | | | | |
| — | Ababacar Ly | Senegal | DNS | | | | | | | | | | | |
| — | Freddy Herbrandt | Belgium | DNS | | | | | | | | | | | |
| — | Samuel Igun | Nigeria | DNS | | | | | | | | | | | |

=== Final ===
The final was held on October 20, 1968. Each jumper again had three attempts at each height, with the bar starting at 2.00 metres. Three jumpers were unable to perform as well as they had in the qualification.

| Rank | Athlete | Nation | 2.00 | 2.03 | 2.06 | 2.09 | 2.12 | 2.14 | 2.16 | 2.18 | 2.20 | 2.22 | 2.24 | 2.29 | Height | Notes |
|---|---|---|---|---|---|---|---|---|---|---|---|---|---|---|---|---|
| 1st place, gold medalist(s) | Dick Fosbury | United States | — | o | — | o | — | o | — | o | o | o | xxo | xxx | 2.24 | OR |
| 2nd place, silver medalist(s) | Ed Caruthers | United States | — | — | — | o | — | xxo | — | xxo | o | xo | xxx | —N/a | 2.22 | |
| 3rd place, bronze medalist(s) | Valentin Gavrilov | Soviet Union | o | o | o | o | o | o | o | — | o | xxx | —N/a | | 2.20 | |
| 4 | Valery Skvortsov | Soviet Union | — | o | xo | o | xxo | o | xxo | xxx | —N/a | | | | 2.16 | |
| 5 | Reynaldo Brown | United States | — | o | — | o | — | o | — | xxx | —N/a | | | | 2.14 | |
| 6 | Giacomo Crosa | Italy | o | — | xo | o | o | o | xxx | —N/a | | | | | 2.14 | |
| 7 | Gunther Spielvogel | West Germany | — | — | o | o | xxo | xo | xxx | —N/a | | | | | 2.14 | |
| 8 | Lawrie Peckham | Australia | — | o | o | o | xo | xxx | —N/a | | | | | | 2.12 | |
| 9 | Robert Sainte-Rose | France | o | — | o | o | xxx | —N/a | | | | | | | 2.09 | |
| 9 | Ingomar Sieghart | West Germany | — | o | o | o | xxx | —N/a | | | | | | | 2.09 | |
| 11 | Luis María Garriga | Spain | o | o | o | xxo | xxx | —N/a | | | | | | | 2.09 | |
| 12 | Ahmed Senoussi | Chad | — | — | xo | xxo | xxx | —N/a | | | | | | | 2.09 | |
| 13 | Miodrag Todosijević | Yugoslavia | o | — | o | xxx | —N/a | | | | | | | | 2.06 | |
