= 1969 European Indoor Games – Men's high jump =

The men's high jump event at the 1969 European Indoor Games was held on 9 March in Belgrade.

== Results ==
Rank	Name	Nationality	Result	Notes
1st place, gold medalist(s)	Valentin Gavrilov	Soviet Union	2.17	
2nd place, silver medalist(s)	Henry Elliott	France	2.14	
3rd place, bronze medalist(s)	Șerban Ioan	Romania	2.14	
4	Rudi Köppen	East Germany	2.11	
5	Michel Portmann	Switzerland	2.08	
6	Evgeni Yordanov	Bulgaria	2.08	
7	József Tihanyi	Hungary	2.08	
8	Luis María Garriga	Spain	2.08	
9	Jan Dahlgren	Sweden	2.08	
9	Thomas Zacharias	West Germany	2.08	
11	Reijo Vähälä	Finland	2.05	
12	Miodrag Todosijević	Yugoslavia	2.05	
13	Roman Moravec	Czechoslovakia	2.05	
14	Ljudevit Silađi	Yugoslavia	2.00	
15	Nurullah Candan	Turkey	1.95	
	Gunther Spielvogel	West Germany	NM	
