= Dwight Stones =

American athletics competitor, high jumper, track and field commentator

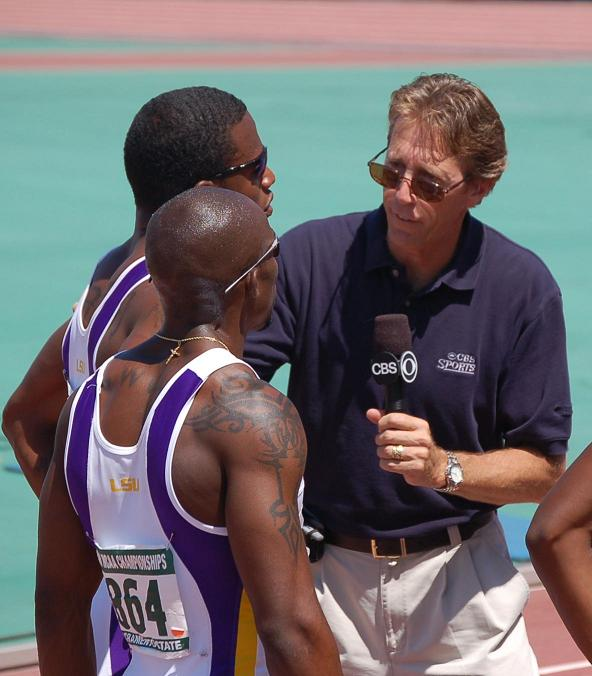
- Stones interviews Xavier Carter and Kelly Willie of LSU.

Personal information
- Nationality: United States
- Born: December 6, 1953 (age 72) Los Angeles
- Height: 6 ft 5 in (1.96 m)
- Weight: 172 lb (78 kg)

Sport
- Sport: Track and field
- Event: High jump
- College team: Long Beach State 49ers UCLA Bruins

Achievements and titles
- Personal best: 2.34 m (1984)
Medal record
Representing United States
Olympic Games
Bronze medal – third place	1972 Munich	High jump
Bronze medal – third place	1976 Montreal	High jump
IAAF World Cup
Silver medal – second place	1977 Düsseldorf	High jump
- Updated on 9 June 2013

Dwight Edwin Stones (born December 6, 1953) is an American television commentator and a two-time Olympic bronze medalist and former three-time world record holder in the men's high jump. During his 16-year career, he won 19 national championships. In 1984, Stones became the first athlete to both compete and serve as an announcer at the same Olympics. Since then, he has been a color analyst for all three major networks in the United States and continues to cover track and field on television. He served as an analyst for NBC Sports coverage of Track and Field at the 2008 Summer Olympics. He is a member of the US Track Hall of Fame, the California Sports Hall of Fame, the International Jewish Sports Hall of Fame, and the Orange County Jewish Sports Hall of Fame.

== Biography ==
Born in Los Angeles, Stones set a national high school record while at Glendale High School in 1971 at 2.17 m (7 ft 1 3/8 in), then won the bronze medal at age 18 at the 1972 Olympics in Munich, West Germany. He set his first world record the following summer when he cleared 2.30 m (7 ft 6 1/2 in), also at Munich. That jump also made him the first "flop" jumper to set a world record, five years after Dick Fosbury made that style famous while winning the gold medal at the 1968 Olympics in Mexico City. Stones raised the world record to 2.31 m (7 ft 6 15/16 in) at the NCAA Championships at Franklin Field in Philadelphia in June 1976, and added another centimeter to the record two months later at 2.32 m (7 ft 7 5/16 in).

Stones attended UCLA his freshman year (1971–72), and later transferred to Long Beach State for a year and a half, and is a member of that university's hall of fame.

In 1994, Stones hosted the second season of the ESPN game show Dream League.

In 1998, Stones was inducted into the National Track and Field Hall of Fame. He was a 1991 inductee into the Orange County Hall of Fame.

Stones is Jewish, and he once competed in the Maccabiah Games in Israel.

== Olympic competition ==
Stones was one of the world's top high jumpers from 1972 to 1984 and has been twice named the World Indoor Athlete of the Year by Track & Field News.

At the 1972 Olympics in Munich, Stones took the bronze medal at age eighteen, behind Jüri Tarmak and Stefan Junge.

At the 1976 Olympics in Montréal, he was a heavy favorite to win the gold medal. Earlier, he finished second at the U.S. Olympic Trials, then had to settle for another Olympic bronze behind Jacek Wszoła and local favorite Greg Joy when his jumping ability was hampered by the competition being struck by heavy rain. A few days later, he raised the world record to 2.32 m (7 ft 7 5/16 in) in dry conditions at Franklin Field in Philadelphia.

His participation at the Montreal Games sparked a heated debate: he had allegedly said that he hated French Canadians (Montréal-Matin Newspaper, July 29, 1976, pages 5 and 8) when he criticised the organization of the Games in a media interview. Consequently, Stones was subject to raucous booing and hissing during the competition. The debate became so inflamed that he decided on a new tee-shirt for the day of the final, the back of the shirt reading "I love French Canadians", which officials asked him to take off. The Americans in the audience responded to the treatment of Stones by booing Claude Ferragne, a French-Canadian jumper, during the event.

After missing the 1980 Olympics in Moscow due to the American-led boycott, Stones returned to the Games at age thirty in 1984 in Los Angeles, and finished fourth. He cleared 2.31 m, but lost the bronze medal to Zhu Jianhua on the countback. His distant cousin, Doug Nordquist, finished fifth, clearing 2.29 m. He had earned his spot on the U.S. Olympic Team by setting his 13th American record at 2.34 m (7 ft 8 1/8 in), Nordquist finished second (2.31 m) at the U.S. Olympic Trials on June 24.

== Professionalism ==
In the transitional time when amateurism requirements were fought by the athletes, Stones was a leading advocate of the change striving to break the barrier of payment to athletes. During that period, one of the first options was for winnings to be paid to the athlete's club. To answer that, Stones created the Desert Oasis Track Club, a California corporation. The only athlete in the club was Dwight Stones. The stockholders and officers were Dwight Stones and his family members. Stones first made money in the televised sports creation Superstars which was "donated" to the track club. This caused the IAAF and its American affiliate the AAU to suspend Stones. The ensuing lawsuit led to the Amateur Sports Act of 1978, which broke up the AAU, decertifying it as the national governing body for track and field (and many other sports) causing the formation of The Athletics Congress and the slow transition to direct remuneration for athletes.

== Records held ==
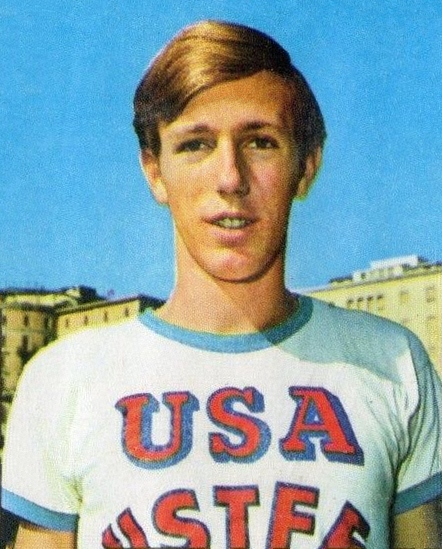
Stones in the early 1970s

- World Record: High Jump – 2.30 m (7 ft 6 1/2 in) on July 11, 1973
- World Record: High Jump – 2.31 m (7 ft 6 3/4 in) on June 5, 1976
- World Record: High Jump – 2.32 m (7 ft 7 1/4 in) on August 4, 1976
- American Record: High Jump – 2.34 m (7 ft 8 in) on June 24, 1984

== Championships ==
1984

- 1984 Olympic Games: High Jump (4th)
- 1984 U.S. Olympic Trials: High Jump – 2.34 m (1st)

1983

- 1983 TAC Outdoor Championships: High Jump (1st)
- 1983 TAC Indoor Championships: High Jump (3rd)

1982

- 1982 TAC Indoor Championships: High Jump (1st)

1980

- 1980 AAU Outdoor Championships: High Jump (3rd)

1978

- 1978 AAU Outdoor Championships: High Jump (1st)

1977

- 1977 World Cup: High Jump (2nd)
- 1977 AAU Indoor Championships: High Jump (1st)
- 1977 USTFF Outdoor Championships: High Jump (1st)
- 1977 AAU Outdoor Championships: High Jump (1st)

1976

- 1976 Summer Olympics: High Jump (3rd – bronze medal)
- 1976 U.S. Olympic Trials: High Jump (2nd)
- 1976 USTFF Outdoor Championships: High Jump (1st)
- 1976 AAU Outdoor Championships: High Jump (1st)
- 1976 NCAA Outdoor Championships: High Jump – 2.31 m (1st)
- 1976 NCAA Indoor Championships: High Jump (1st)(Cal State Long Beach)

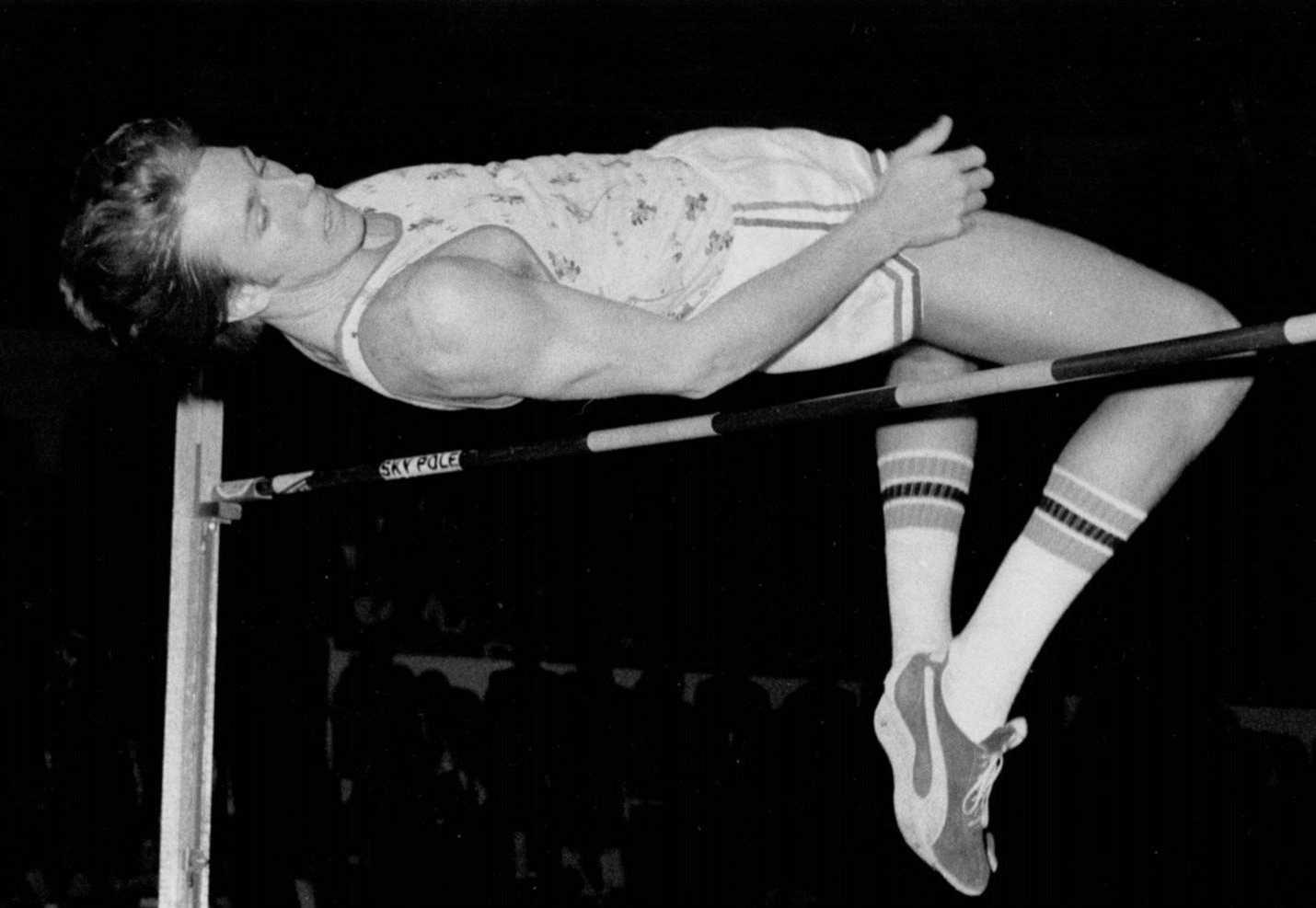
Stones at the 1975 AAU Indoor Championships

1975

- 1975 USTFF Indoor Championships: High Jump (1st)
- 1975 USTFF Outdoor Championships: High Jump (1st)
- 1975 AAU Indoor Championships: High Jump (1st)
- 1975 AAU Outdoor Championships: High Jump (3rd)

1974

- 1974 USTFF Indoor Championships: High Jump (1st)
- 1974 AAU Outdoor Championships: High Jump (1st)

1973

- 1973 USTFF Indoor Championships: High Jump (1st)
- 1973 USTFF Outdoor Championships: High Jump (1st)
- 1973 AAU Indoor Championships: High Jump (1st)
- 1973 AAU Outdoor Championships: High Jump (1st)

1972

- 1972 Summer Olympics: High Jump – 2.21 m (3rd – bronze medal)
- 1972 U.S. Olympic Trials: High Jump – 2.21 m (1st)
- 1972 NCAA Outdoor Championships: High Jump (3rd)(UCLA)

== See also ==
- List of select Jewish track and field athletes

Records
Preceded by (United States) Pat Matzdorf	Men's High Jump World Record Holder; 1973-07-11 — 1977-06-02	Succeeded by (Soviet Union) Vladimir Yashchenko
Sporting positions
Preceded by (Soviet Union) Jüri Tarmak	Men's High Jump Best Year Performance; 1973 — 1976	Succeeded by (Soviet Union) Vladimir Yashchenko
