= Reynaldo Brown =

American track and field athlete

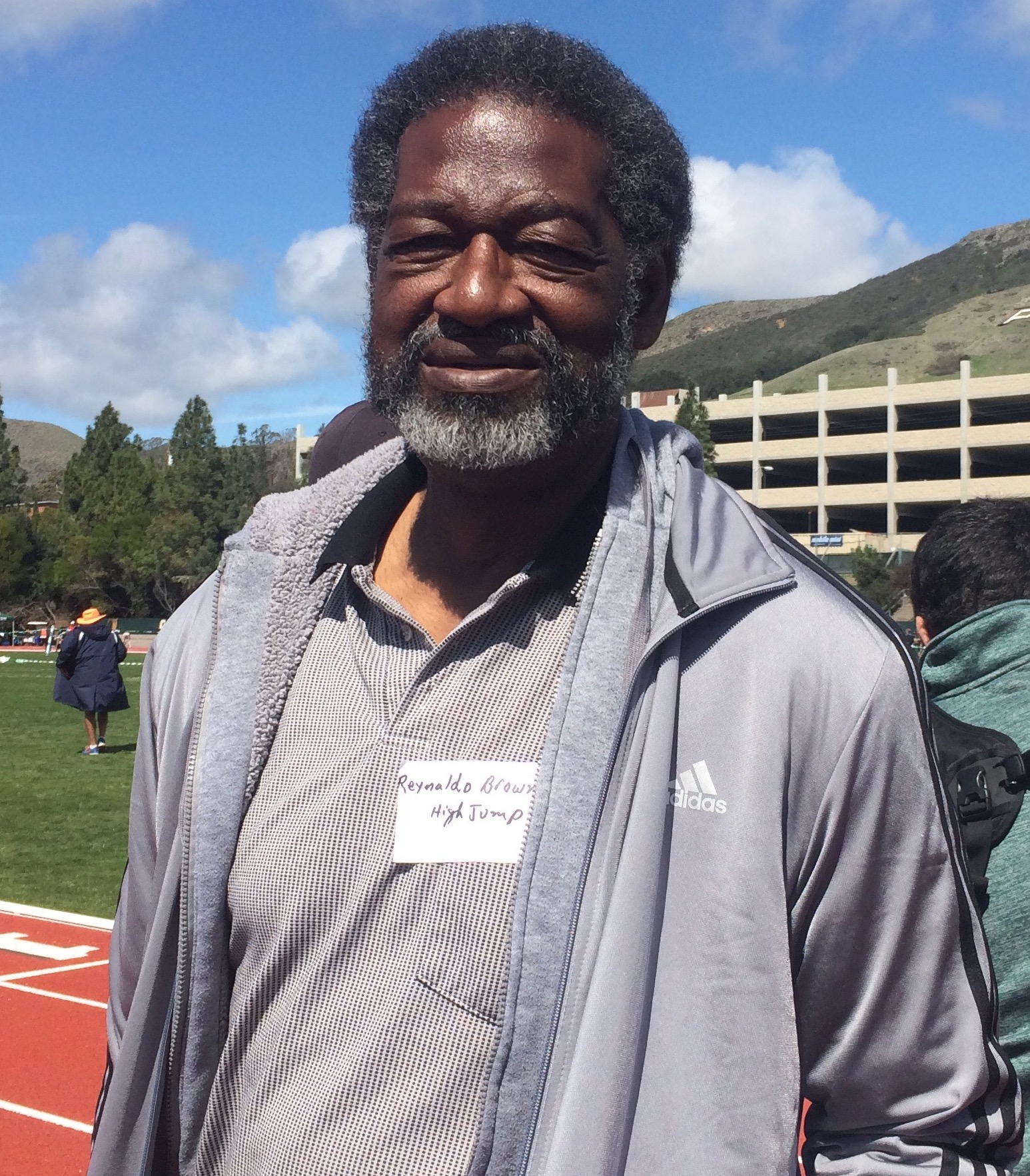
Reynaldo Brown in 2018

Reynaldo Brown (born December 6, 1950, in Los Angeles, California) is an American track and field athlete, known for the high jump. He competed in the 1968 Summer Olympics at the beginning of his senior year in high school, finishing fifth. His participation in that transitional event had him witnessing teammate Dick Fosbury winning the gold medal using the Fosbury Flop, leaving Brown as one of the last successful jumpers to use the straddle technique.

== Early life and Olympics ==
While at Compton High School, Brown won the CIF California State Meet three straight times, after being overshadowed by teammate Bill Morris as a freshman. He was the first high school athlete to jump seven feet. He was invited to that year's Semifinal Olympic Trials, an elimination event. Finishing fourth, he qualified to the Olympic Trials at Echo Summit. Brown had to defeat another high school phenom, John Hartfield, to make the team, ultimately finishing second behind another Californian Ed Caruthers, the future silver medalist, and ahead of Fosbury. Brown returned to school late in the term after his Olympic adventure. Two months behind, he had to study hard to catch up. By February, he led his Compton team to the CIF State basketball championship. He was Track & Field News' "High School Athlete of the Year" in 1968.

== College and international success ==
Brown continued his education at Cal Poly, San Luis Obispo. While at Cal Poly, he won two NCAA College Division/Division II national titles, which qualified him to compete and also win at the NCAA Division I National Championship each of those years: 1971 at Washington and 1973 at LSU. In the process, he set the NCAA Small School, Cal Poly school and National Collegiate outdoor records with a clearance of 7-foot-4 (or 2.23m) as a Mustang senior in 1973.

For 1973, Brown not only won the high jump at 15 meets during the year, but also ranked second in the world for the high jump, behind only Dwight Stones. In 1971, Brown was awarded the all-sports CCAA Athlete of the Year honor, and in 1993 he was inducted into the Cal Poly Athletics Hall of Fame.

Brown was one of the most consistent 7-foot jumpers of the 1970s. On January 14, 1972, Brown jumped 2.24m, or 7 feet, 4 inches (setting a new American indoor record), in College Park, Maryland, at the National Invitational meet, where he was just five-eighths of an inch away from the then-world record held by Valeriy Brumel.

He also won the USA Outdoor Track and Field Championships in 1970 and 1971. In-between those, he won the 1971 USA Indoor Track and Field Championships.

Brown also played basketball at Cal Poly in the 1971-72 season, as he made 14 of 24 field-goal attempts and averaged 4.4 points while helping the Mustangs earn a 16–10 record for the season.

== Senior career ==
In 2009, at age 58, Brown competed in the Senior Games.

In November 2015, Brown received the Athletes in Excellence Award from The Foundation for Global Sports Development, in recognition of his community service efforts and work with youth.

Brown had a kidney transplant and credits his athletic conditioning to his recovery and survival.

In February 2017, Brown, who is also a photographer, got his works displayed through the Art of the Olympians.
