= Athletics at the 1967 Summer Universiade – Men's high jump =

The men's high jump event at the 1967 Summer Universiade was held at the National Olympic Stadium in Tokyo on 1 September 1967.

== Results ==
Rank	Name	Nationality	Result	Notes
1st place, gold medalist(s)	Miodrag Todosijević	Yugoslavia	2.05	
2nd place, silver medalist(s)	Hidehiko Tomizawa	Japan	2.05	
3rd place, bronze medalist(s)	Hironobu Kinoshita	Japan	2.05	
4	Guy Guézille	France	1.95	
5	Harhishan Yadav	India	1.95	
6	Mustapha Ndir	Ivory Coast	1.95	
	Dennis Owenje	Kenya	NM	
