= Jacques Madubost =

French track and field athlete

Medal record

Men's athletics

Representing France

European Championships
Gold medal – first place	1966 Budapest	High jump

Jacques Madubost (6 June 1944 – 29 June 2018) was a French track and field athlete who competed in the high jump.

Despite never winning a national title at the French Athletics Championships, he was the gold medallist at the 1966 European Athletics Championships in Budapest. He defeated compatriot Robert Sainte-Rose – the leading French athlete of the era – by count-back, as both cleared 2.12 m (6 ft 11 1/4 in). This made Madubost the first Frenchman to win a field event at the championship, and he remains the sole French male athlete to win the European title in men's high jump (Anne-Marie Colchen won the women's event 20 years earlier). For his achievement he was given the 1966 medal of the Académie des sports (one of two from athletics, alongside sprinter Roger Bambuck).

The 1966 season proved to be a peak of his career, as he also twice improved the French national record with clearances of 2.14 m (7 ft 1/4 in) and 2.15 m (7 ft 1/2 in). He represented France at the 1968 European Athletics Indoor Championships, but did not match his previous success and ended the competition in 18th place.

A policeman by occupation, after his retirement from athletics he represented France internationally in sport shooting.
