= John Beers =

Canadian high jumper (born 1952)

Personal information
- Nationality: Canadian
- Born: 17 August 1952 (age 73) Netherlands
- Height: 183 cm (6 ft 0 in)
- Weight: 75 kg (165 lb)

Sport
- Sport: Athletics
- Event: High jump

John Beers (born 17 August 1952) is a Canadian athlete. He competed in the men's high jump at the 1972 Summer Olympics.
