= John Hawkins (athlete) =

Canadian high jumper (born 1949)

Personal information
- Nationality: Canadian
- Born: 8 June 1949 (age 77) Kelowna, British Columbia, Canada

Sport
- Sport: Athletics
- Event: High jump
Medal record
Representing Canada
Commonwealth Games
Silver medal – second place	1970 Edinburgh	High jump
Summer Universiade
Bronze medal – third place	1973 Moscow	High jump

John Hawkins (born 8 June 1949) is a Canadian athlete. He competed in the men's high jump at the 1972 Summer Olympics.
