= Anthony Balfour =

Bahamian high jumper

Personal information
- Nationality: Bahamian
- Born: 19 December 1949 (age 76)

Sport
- Sport: Athletics
- Event: High jump

Anthony Richard Balfour (born 19 December 1949) is a Bahamian athlete. He competed in the men's high jump at the 1968 Summer Olympics.
