= Thomas Wieser (athlete) =

Swiss high jumper

Personal information
- Nationality: Swiss
- Born: 28 December 1949 (age 76)
- Height: 6 ft 3 in (191 cm)
- Weight: 183 lb (83 kg)

Sport
- Sport: Athletics
- Event: High jump

Thomas Wieser (born 28 December 1949) is a Swiss athlete. He competed in the men's high jump at the 1968 Summer Olympics, finished 31st in the first round. He achieved a personal best of 2.14 meters in 1969.
