= Sitha Sin =

Cambodian high jumper

Personal information
- Nationality: Cambodian
- Born: 10 March 1950 (age 76)

Sport
- Sport: Athletics
- Event: High jump

Sitha Sin (born 10 March 1950) is a Cambodian athlete. He competed in the men's high jump at the 1972 Summer Olympics.
