= Park Sang-su =

South Korean high jumper

Personal information
- Nationality: South Korean
- Born: 8 August 1953 (age 72)

Sport
- Sport: Athletics
- Event: High jump

Park Sang-su (born 8 August 1953) is a South Korean athlete. He competed in the men's high jump at the 1972 Summer Olympics.
