= Marconi Turay =

Sierra Leonean athlete

Personal information
- Nationality: Sierra Leonean
- Born: 11 August 1949 (age 76) Waterloo, Sierra Leone

Sport
- Sport: Athletics
- Event: High jump

Marconi Turay (born 11 August 1949) is a Sierra Leonean athlete. He competed in the men's high jump at the 1968 Summer Olympics.
