= Hong Son-long =

Taiwanese high jumper

Personal information
- Full name: 洪 三郎, Pinyin: Hóng Sān-láng
- Nationality: Taiwanese
- Born: 27 May 1941 (age 85)

Sport
- Sport: Athletics
- Event: High jump

Hong Son-long (born 27 May 1941) is a Taiwanese athlete. He competed in the men's high jump at the 1968 Summer Olympics.
