= Hermann Magerl =

German athletics competitor

Personal information
- Nationality: German
- Born: 13 January 1949 Obertraubling, Germany

Sport
- Sport: Athletics
- Event: High jump

Hermann Magerl (born 13 January 1949) is a former German athlete. He competed in the men's high jump at the 1972 Summer Olympics.
