= Michel Patry =

Swiss high jumper

Personal information
- Nationality: Swiss
- Born: 16 January 1953 (age 73)

Sport
- Sport: Athletics
- Event: High jump

Michel Patryr (born 16 January 1953) is a Swiss athlete. He competed in the men's high jump at the 1972 Summer Olympics.
