= Peter Boyce =

Australian high jumper

Personal information
- Nationality: Australian
- Born: 14 May 1946 (age 80) Melbourne, Australia

Sport
- Sport: Athletics
- Event: High jump

Peter Boyce (born 14 May 1946) is an Australian athlete. He competed in the men's high jump at the 1968 Summer Olympics. He came in 26th place and did not qualify for the final.

Competing for the Stanford Cardinal track and field team, Boyce finished 3rd in the high jump at the 1968 NCAA University Division outdoor track and field championships.
