= Stefan Junge =

East German high jumper

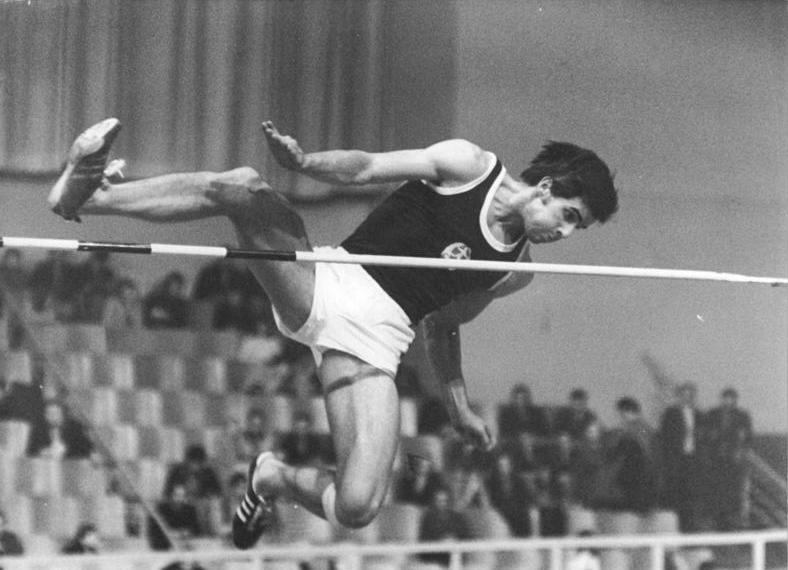

Medal record

Men's athletics

Representing East Germany

Olympic Games
Silver medal – second place	1972 Munich	High jump

Stefan Junge (born 1 September 1950 in Leipzig, Sachsen) is a German former athlete, who stood 195 cm and weighed 85 kg, who mainly competed in the high jump.

Junge competed for East Germany in the 1972 Summer Olympics held in Munich, Germany where he won the silver medal in the men's high jump event.
