= Bernard Gauthier (athlete) =

French high jumper

Personal information
- Born: 4 July 1949 (age 77) Orléans, France
- Height: 181 cm (5 ft 11 in)
- Weight: 78 kg (172 lb)

Sport
- Country: France
- Sport: Athletics
- Event: High jump

Bernard Gauthier (born 4 July 1949) is a French athlete. He competed in the men's high jump at the 1972 Summer Olympics.
