= Pat Matzdorf =

American former high jumper (born 1949)

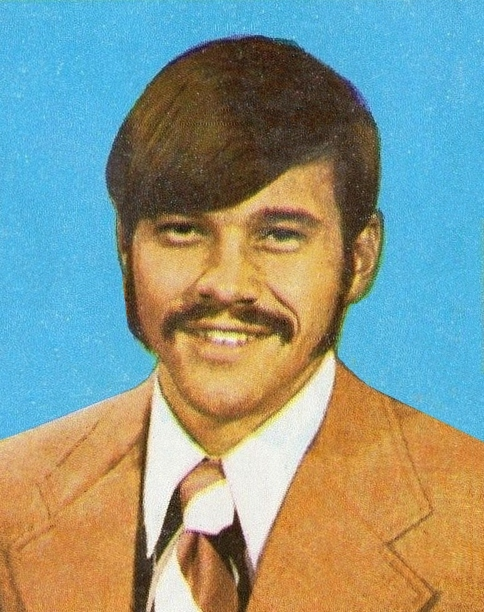

Personal information
- Full name: Patrick Clifford Matzdorf
- Born: December 26, 1949 (age 76) Sheboygan, Wisconsin

Sport
- Sport: Athletics
- Event: High jump

Achievements and titles
- Personal best: 2.29 m (1971)
Medal record
Representing the United States
Pan American Games
Gold medal – first place	1971 Cali	High jump

Patrick Clifford Matzdorf (born December 26, 1949) is an American former high jumper, who set a world record of 2.29 meters (7'-6 1/4") at a World All-Star Track Meet in Berkeley, California. Matzdorf, a Junior at the University of Wisconsin, where he also played basketball, entered the July 3, 1971 meet against the Soviet Union with a personal best of 7'-3" (2.21 m.) achieved earlier that year in March. He broke the world record that day on his third attempt at 2.29 meters.

Matzdorf utilized the bent-leg straddle jumping style, a modification of the classic straight-leg straddle which dominated the sport in the 1950s and 1960s.

Matzdorf finished second behind fellow American Dwight Stones in the high jump event at the british 1974 AAA Championships.

== Corporate life ==
Patrick Clifford Matzdorf worked for AT&T Bell Labs at Indian Hill in Autoplex. He coined the phrase "wireless" as part of a standards meeting and was distinguished by his mustache.

== Corporate sports ==
During his life at AT&T, according to co-workers, he played softball, which every time at the plate he stroked a home run. A company teammate, Tom Giammarresi, remembers "his throws from left field that were, not far off the ground, and traveled all the way to home plate like bullets." He also played coed volleyball. According to Sheila K. Brown Klinger, she stated "we all played volleyball together at IH (Randy Downing, director, and Dave Carbaugh, DH, were also on our team)."

Records
Preceded by (Soviet Union) Valeriy Brumel	Men's High Jump World Record Holder; 1971-07-03 — 1973-07-11	Succeeded by (United States) Dwight Stones
Sporting positions
Preceded by (China) Ni Zhiqin	Men's High Jump Best Year Performance; 1971	Succeeded by (Soviet Union) Jüri Tarmak
