= Dick Fosbury =

American high jumper (1947–2023)

Dick Fosbury OLY
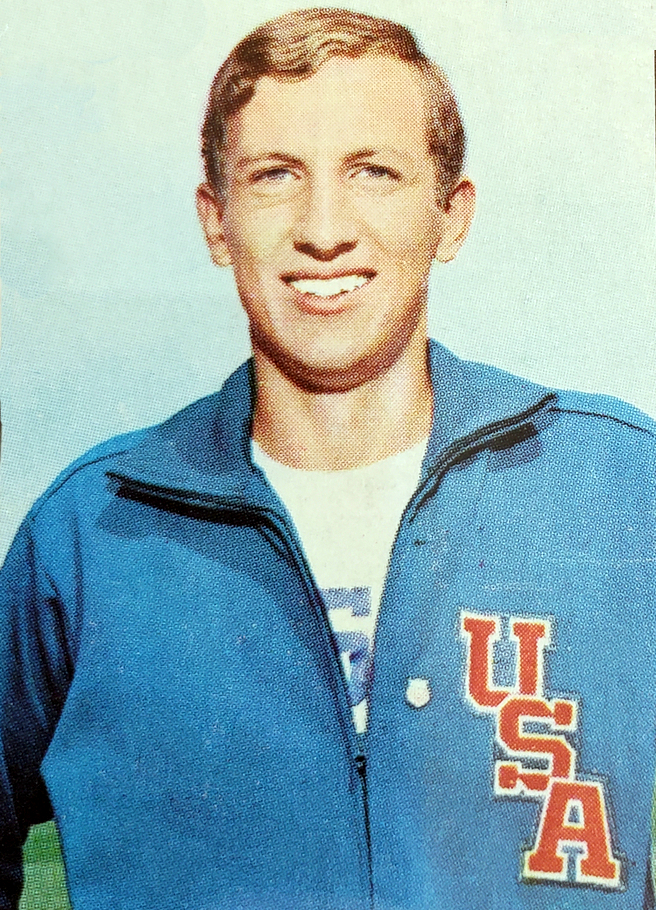
- Fosbury in 1968

Personal information
- Full name: Richard Douglas Fosbury
- Born: March 6, 1947 Portland, Oregon, U.S.
- Died: March 12, 2023 (aged 76) Salt Lake City, Utah, U.S.
- Height: 6 ft 4 in (193 cm)
- Weight: 183 lb (83 kg)

Sport
- Country: United States
- Sport: Athletics
- Event: High jump
- College team: Oregon State University
- Club: Oregon State Beavers, Corvallis

Achievements and titles
- Personal best: 2.24 m (7 ft 4¼ in) (1968)
Medal record
Men's athletics
Representing the United States
Olympic Games
Gold medal – first place	1968 Mexico City	High jump

Richard Douglas Fosbury (March 6, 1947 – March 12, 2023) was an American high jumper, who is considered one of the most influential athletes in the history of track and field. He won a gold medal at the 1968 Summer Olympics, revolutionizing the high jump event with a "back-first" technique now known as the Fosbury flop. His method was to sprint diagonally towards the bar, then curve and leap backward over it, which gave him a much lower center of mass in flight than traditional techniques. Debbie Brill was developing her similar "Brill Bend" around the same time. This approach has seen nearly universal adoption since Fosbury's performance in Mexico. Though he never returned to the Olympics, Fosbury continued to be involved in athletics after retirement and served on the executive board of the World Olympians Association.

In 2014, Fosbury challenged Steve Miller for a seat in the Idaho House of Representatives, but was unsuccessful. Fosbury ran for Blaine County Commissioner against incumbent Larry Schoen in 2018, won the seat, and took office in 2019.

== Athletic career ==
=== High school and the origins of the Fosbury Flop ===
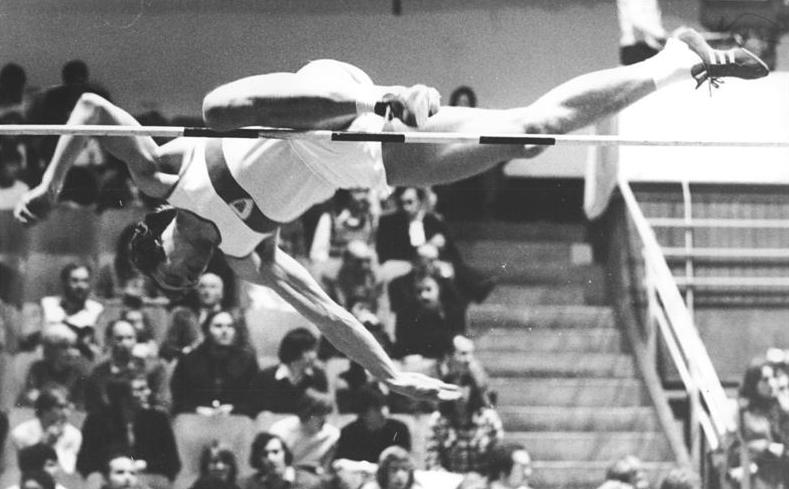
A high jumper performing the straddle technique, the first high-jumping technique that Fosbury was taught

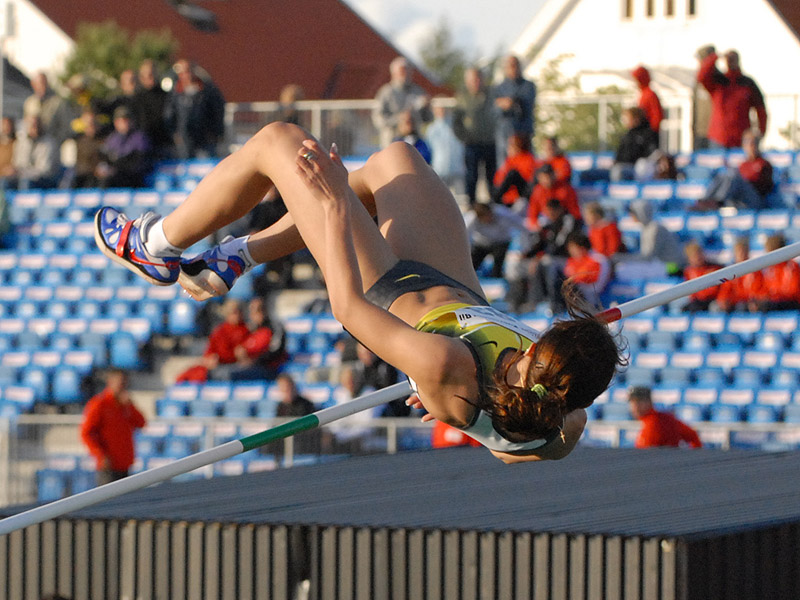
Yelena Slesarenko using the Fosbury flop technique.

Born in Portland, Oregon, Fosbury started experimenting with a new high-jumping technique at age 16, while attending Medford High School. Fosbury had difficulty competing using the dominant high-jumping techniques of the period. In his second year, he failed to complete jumps of five feet (1.52 m), the qualifying height for many high-school track meets. This dominant technique, the straddle method, was a complex motion where an athlete went over the high-jump bar facing down, and lifted their legs individually over the bar. Fosbury found it difficult to coordinate all the motions involved in the straddle method, so he began to experiment with other ways of doing the high jump.

Fosbury later recalled, "I knew I had to change my body position and that's what started first the revolution, and over the next two years, the evolution." At first, he tried to use a technique known as the upright scissors method. In this method, a jumper runs upright towards the bar, facing forward, and during their jump lifts their straight legs one at a time over the bar. High-jump rules stipulate only that competitors must jump off one foot at takeoff; there is no rule governing how a competitor crosses the bar, so long as they go over it.

As he began to experiment with this technique, he gradually adapted it to make himself more comfortable and to get more height out of it. Nonetheless, it was nowhere near as coordinated as a well-performed straddle method jump, and one historian has referred to Fosbury's early attempts as an "airborne seizure". However, during the latter part of his second year and the beginning of his junior year, it started to produce results, and he gradually was able to clear higher jumps.

Gradually, Fosbury shifted his positioning during the jump, such that by his senior year he had begun to go over the bar backward, head-first, curving his body over the bar and kicking his legs up in the air at the end of the jump. This required him to land on his back, but, prior to his junior year, his high school had replaced its wood chip landing pit with a softer material, so he was able to land safely.

Luckily for Fosbury, replacement of landing surfaces with foam rubber was becoming common across the United States in the early 1960s. Sawdust, sand, or woodchip surfaces had been usable previously because jumpers using the scissors technique were able to clear the bar while upright and then land on their feet, and those using the Western Roll or Straddle made a three-point landing on their hands and lead leg. In the late 1950s, U.S. colleges began to use bundles of soft foam rubber, usually held together by a mesh net. These bundles were not only much softer, but raised the landing height about three feet (0.91 m) off the ground. By the early 1960s, U.S. high schools were following the lead of the colleges in acquiring foam rubber landing pits. With the softer, elevated landing surface, Fosbury was able to land safely.

Fosbury did, however, compress a couple of vertebrae in the mid-1960s because not all high schools could afford the upgraded, foam material. Fosbury recovered from this injury.

Fosbury's coaches at first encouraged him to continue practicing the straddle method, but they abandoned that idea when his marks continued to improve. In his junior year, he broke his high-school record with a 6 ft 3 in (1.91 m) jump, and the next year took second place in the state with a 6 ft 5.5 in (1.969 m) jump.

The technique gained the name the "Fosbury Flop" when in 1964 the Medford Mail-Tribune ran a photo captioned "Fosbury Flops Over Bar," while in an accompanying article a reporter wrote that he looked like "a fish flopping in a boat." Others were even less kind, with one newspaper captioning Fosbury's photograph, "World's Laziest High Jumper".

=== College ===
After graduating from Medford High School in 1965, he enrolled at Oregon State University in Corvallis. The school's coach, Berny Wagner, believed that Fosbury would eventually achieve greater results using the western roll and convinced him to continue practicing the old technique through his first year, although he was allowed to use the "flop" in freshman meets. The debate over technique ended during Fosbury's second year, however, when he cleared 6 feet 10 inches (2.08 m) in his first meet of the season, shattering the school record.

Fosbury later recalled:

After the meet, Berny came up to me and said, "That's enough." That was the end of Plan A, on to Plan B. He would study what I was doing, film it, and even start to try to experiment and teach it to the younger jumpers.

The national sports media began to take notice of the jumper from Oregon with the unusual style. He was on the cover of Track and Field News's February 1968 issue. Fosbury won the 1968 National Collegiate Athletic Association (NCAA) title using his new technique—the first of two consecutive titles—as well as the United States Olympic Trials.

Fosbury continued to refine his technique, developing a curved, J-shaped approach run. This allowed him to increase his speed, while the final "curved" steps served to rotate his hips. As his speed increased, so did his elevation. Fosbury made little to no use of his arms at takeoff, failing to "pump" them upwards, keeping them down, close to his body; the next generation of floppers would add an arm pump. Fosbury's key discovery was the need to adjust his point of takeoff as the bar was raised. His flight through the air described a parabola: as the bar went up in height, he needed more "flight time" so that the top of his arc was achieved as his hips passed over the bar. To increase "flight time", Fosbury moved his takeoff further and further away from the bar (and the pit). By way of comparison, classic straddle jumpers plant their take-off foot in the same place every time, less than one foot away from a line parallel with the bar. Photographs of Fosbury attempting heights above 7 feet (2.1 m) show him taking off nearly 4 feet (1.2 m) out from the bar.

In the 1968 outdoor season, Fosbury won the Pac-8 Conference title and went on to win the NCAA championship at Berkeley, California, in mid-June with a jump of 7 feet 2.5 inches (2.197 m). He duplicated those wins the following year.

=== Fosbury at the 1968 Summer Olympics ===
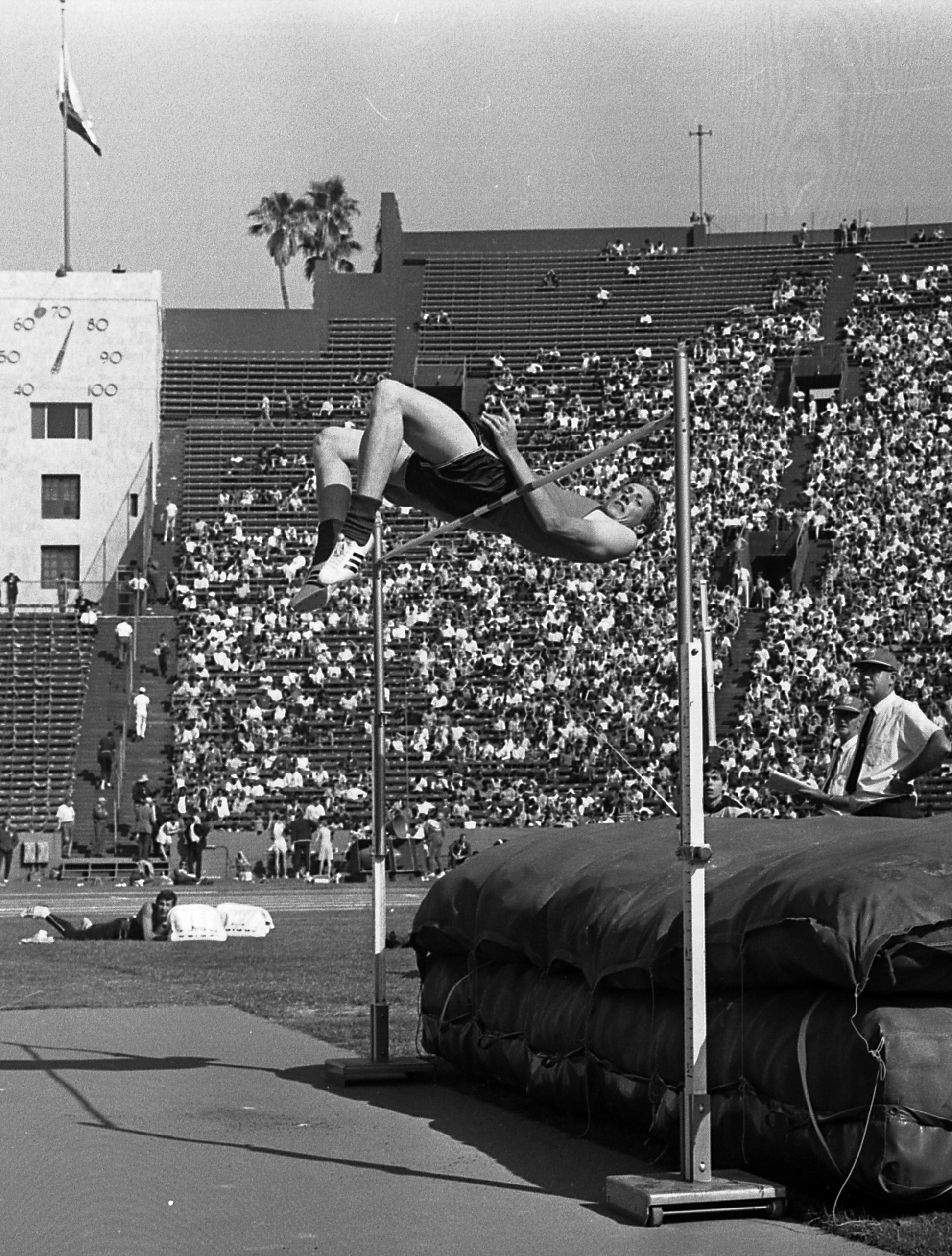
Fosbury at the 1968 U.S. Olympic trials

Fresh off his NCAA win in mid-June, Fosbury went on to win the U.S. Olympic trials two weeks later in Los Angeles with a jump of 2.16 m (7 ft 1 in). Despite the win, his place on the Olympic team was not assured because the U.S. Olympic Committee was worried that the results at sea-level Los Angeles might not be replicated at the high altitude in Mexico City. Another competition was held in September at the Olympic camp at Echo Summit near South Lake Tahoe, California. At that competition, Fosbury was one of four men to clear 2.18 m (7 ft 1 7/8 in), but he was in fourth place because of misses. The bar was raised to 2.20 m (7 ft 2 5/8 in), a height none of the four had ever cleared. However, Olympic veteran Ed Caruthers, high schooler Reynaldo Brown, and Fosbury all cleared on their first attempts. When the fourth man, John Hartfield, another high schooler who had been leading the competition, missed all three of his attempts, the Olympic team of three jumpers was set.

At the 1968 Olympics in Mexico City, Fosbury took the gold medal and set a new Olympic record at 2.24 m (7 ft 4 1/4 in), displaying the potential of the new technique. Despite the initial skeptical reactions from the high-jumping community, the "Fosbury Flop" quickly gained acceptance. In the Finals competition, only three jumpers cleared 2.20 m (7 ft 2 5/8 in), and Fosbury was in the lead by virtue of having cleared every height on his first attempt. At the next height, 2.22 m (7 ft 3 3/8 in), Fosbury again cleared the bar on his first jump. His teammate, Ed Caruthers, cleared on his second effort, while Valentin Gavrilov of the Soviet Union missed on all three attempts and earned the bronze medal (third place). The bar was raised to 2.24 m (7 ft 4 1/4 in), which would be new Olympic and United States records. Fosbury missed on his first two attempts, but cleared on his third, while Caruthers missed on all three of his attempts. Having won the gold medal and broken the American record, Fosbury asked the bar to be raised to 2.29 m (7 ft 6 1/8 in) for his final three attempts, hoping to break Valeriy Brumel's five-year-old world record of 2.28 m (7 ft 5 3/4 in). All three attempts were unsuccessful.

=== Athletic legacy and the dominance of the Flop ===
At the next Olympics in 1972 at Munich, 28 of the 40 competitors used Fosbury's technique, although gold medalist Jüri Tarmak used the straddle technique. In the women's event, the winner Ulrike Meyfarth used Fosbury's technique. By 1980, 13 of the 16 Olympic finalists used it. Of the 36 Olympic medalists in the event from 1972 through 2000, 34 used "the Flop", making it the most popular technique in high jumping.

Fosbury was inducted into the National Track and Field Hall of Fame in 1981.

In 1988, Fosbury competed in the Masters Outdoor Nike World Games and taught at the jump clinic held during the meet.

In 2013, Fosbury's high jump appeared in a Mazda commercial portraying "Game Changers" and, with Fosbury himself, in an ad for Wuaki TV.

In 2015, Swedish DJ and Producer Avicii released the music video for "Broken Arrows" (with lyrics by Zac Brown) that is loosely based on Fosbury's high-jumping story and personal life.

In 2020, SuperWest Sports included Fosbury in its list of The Greatest Pac-12 Male Track and Field Athletes of All Time, naming him the best-ever at Oregon State University.

== Politics ==
After the national anthem during his Olympic medal ceremony, Fosbury stated that he raised his fist in solidarity with the earlier civil rights protest at the games. After returning to Oregon State University, Fosbury also stood up for a black football player who was removed from the school team after refusing to shave his facial hair.

In fall 2014, Fosbury unsuccessfully ran as a Democrat for a seat in the Idaho House of Representatives against incumbent Republican Representative Steve Miller.

In January 2019, Fosbury succeeded Larry Schoen as Blaine County Commissioner.

== Personal life ==
Fosbury graduated from Oregon State University in 1972 with a degree in civil engineering and was the co-owner of Galena Engineering, Inc. in Ketchum, Idaho, where he lived from 1977.

In March 2008, Fosbury was diagnosed with stage-one lymphoma. He had surgery a month later to remove a cancerous tumor engulfing his lower vertebra. Due to concerns about the tumor's proximity to the spine, it was not completely removed and he was put on a chemotherapy regimen. In March 2009, Fosbury announced that he was in remission. In March 2014, he stated in an interview with the Corvallis Gazette-Times that he was "doing well" and was "clear of cancer."

During the 2008 edition of "Sport Movies & TV – Milano International FICTS Fest", Fosbury was awarded the Excellence Guirlande d'Honneur and entered in the FICTS "Hall of Fame".

Fosbury was a member of the "Champions for Peace" club, a group of 54 famous elite athletes committed to serving peace in the world through sport, created by Peace and Sport, a Monaco-based international organization.

Fosbury, along with fellow Olympians Gary Hall and Anne Cribbs, was a founder of World Fit, a non-profit organization that promotes youth fitness programs and Olympic ideals.

Fosbury was married to Robin Tomasi. He died on March 12, 2023, aged 76, after a short bout with a recurrence of lymphoma.

== See also ==
- Athletics at the 1968 Summer Olympics – Men's high jump
