= Șerban Ioan =

Romanian high jumper

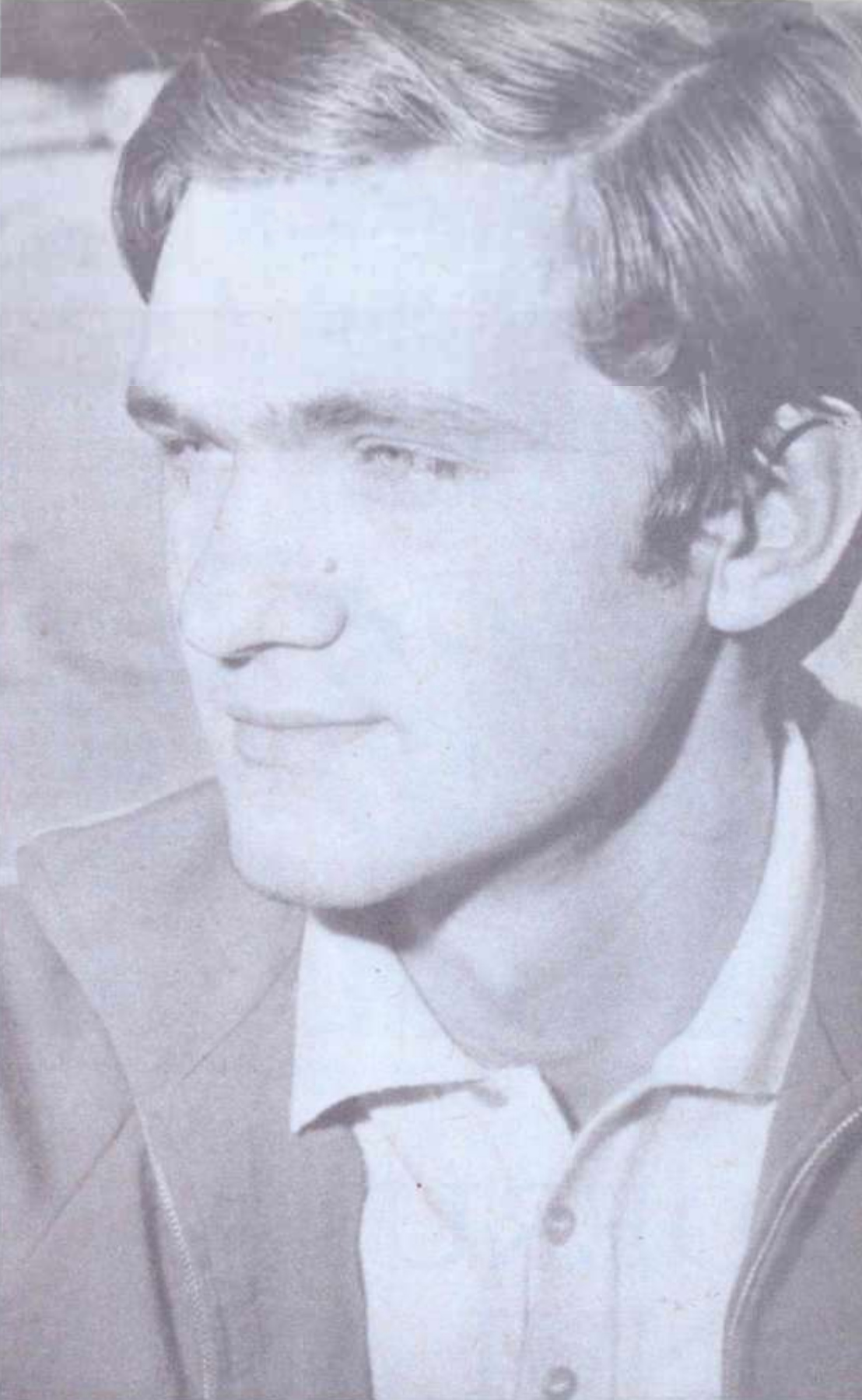

Personal information
- Nationality: Romanian
- Born: 2 May 1948 (age 78) Bucharest, Romania

Sport
- Sport: Athletics
- Event: High jump
Medal record
Men's athletics
Representing Romania
European Indoor Championships
Bronze medal – third place	1969 Belgrade	High jump
Bronze medal – third place	1970 Vienna	High jump
Summer Universiade
Bronze medal – third place	1970 Turin	High jump

Șerban Ioan (born 2 May 1948) is a Romanian athlete. He competed in the men's high jump at the 1972 Summer Olympics.
