= Hidehiko Tomizawa =

Japanese high jumper

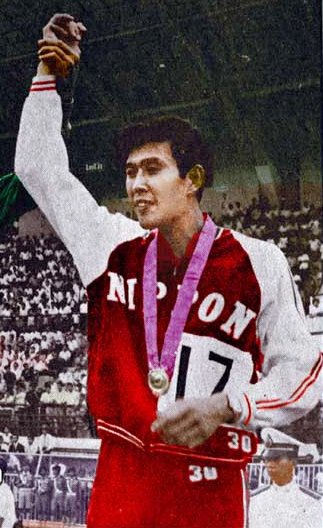
- Tomizawa at the 1970 Asian Games

Personal information
- Nationality: Japanese
- Born: 1 June 1946
- Died: 10 August 2018 (aged 72)
- Height: 185 cm (6 ft 1 in)
- Weight: 75 kg (165 lb)

Sport
- Sport: Athletics
- Event: High jump

Achievements and titles
- Personal best: 2.20 m (1971)
Medal record
Representing Japan
Asian Games
Silver medal – second place	1970 Bangkok	High jump
Summer Universiade
Silver medal – second place	1967 Tokyo	High jump

Hidehiko Tomizawa (Japanese: 冨沢 英彦, 1 June 1946 – 10 August 2018) was a Japanese high jumper. He won a silver medal at the 1970 Asian Games and placed 19th at the 1972 Olympics.

He won the British AAA Championships title at the 1970 AAA Championships.
