= Kuniyoshi Sugioka =

Japanese high jumper

Personal information
- Nationality: Japanese
- Born: 10 February 1942 (age 84) Tokyo, Japan
- Height: 181 cm (5 ft 11 in)
- Weight: 70 kg (154 lb)

Sport
- Sport: Athletics
- Event: high jump
Medal record
Representing Japan
Asian Games
Gold medal – first place	1962 Jakarta	High jump
Summer Universiade
Bronze medal – third place	1965 Budapest	High jump

Kuniyoshi Sugioka (杉岡 邦由, Sugioka Kuniyoshi; born 10 February 1942) is a Japanese former high jumper who competed at four Olympic Games.

== Biography ==
Sugioka participated at the 1960 Summer Olympics, 1964 Summer Olympics, 1968 Summer Olympics and in the 1972 Summer Olympics.

Sugioka won the British AAA Championships title at the 1962 AAA Championships and 1963 AAA Championships.

He returned to Britain for the 1970 AAA Championships and finished runner-up behind fellow Japanese athlete Hidehiko Tomizawa.
