= Ed Caruthers =

American high jumper

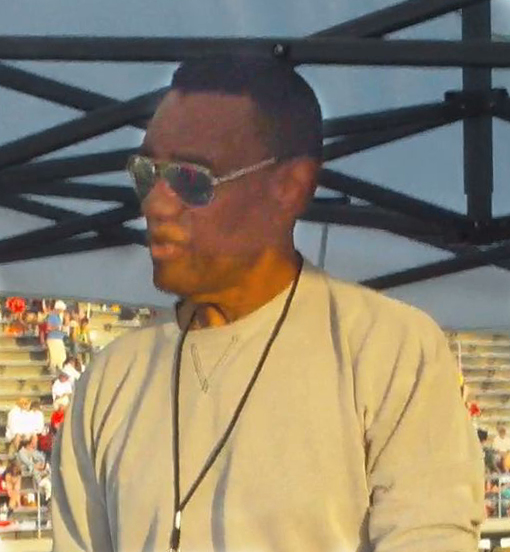
- Caruthers in 2012

Personal information
- Full name: Edward Julius Caruthers Jr.
- Born: April 13, 1945 (age 81) Oklahoma City, Oklahoma, U.S.
Medal record
Men's athletics
Representing the United States
Olympic Games
Silver medal – second place	1968 Mexico City	High Jump
Pan American Games
Gold medal – first place	1967 Winnipeg	High Jump

Edward Julius Caruthers Jr. (born April 13, 1945) is an American former athlete who competed mainly in the men's high jump event during his career.

Born in Oklahoma City, Oklahoma, he competed for the United States at the 1968 Summer Olympics held in Mexico City, Mexico, where he won the silver medal in the men's high jump event. He was also a member of the 1964 US Olympic Team with an 8th-place finish in the high jump.

Caruthers was drafted 310th overall by the Detroit Lions in the 12th round of the 1968 NFL/AFL draft as a defensive back from the University of Arizona.
