= Gunther Spielvogel =

German high jumper

Personal information
- Nationality: German
- Born: 27 April 1944 (age 82) Sosnowiec, Nazi Germany

Sport
- Sport: Athletics
- Event: High jump

Gunther Spielvogel (born 27 April 1944) is a German athlete. He competed in the men's high jump at the 1968 Summer Olympics.
