= Rudolf Hübner (athlete) =

Czech high jumper (born 1944)

Personal information
- Nationality: Czech
- Born: 20 May 1944 (age 82) Prague, Protectorate Bohemia and Moravia

Sport
- Sport: Athletics
- Event: High jump

Rudolf Hübner (born 20 May 1944) is a Czech athlete of German descent. He competed in the men's high jump at the 1968 Summer Olympics.

His wife was Miloslava Rezková, a Czech athlete.
