= Edward Czernik =

Polish high jumper (1940–2023)

Personal information
- Nationality: Polish
- Born: 25 September 1940 Dubliany, Ukrainian SSR, Soviet Union
- Died: 31 May 2023 (aged 82) Zielona Góra, Poland

Sport
- Sport: Athletics
- Event: High jump
Medal record
Representing Poland
Summer Universiade
| Silver medal – second place | 1965 Budapest | High jump |

Edward Czernik (25 September 1940 – 31 May 2023) was a Polish athlete. He competed in the men's high jump at the 1964 Summer Olympics.
