= Robert Sainte-Rose =

French athlete (born 1943)

Personal information
- Born: Robert Sainte-Rose; July 5, 1943 (age 83) Fort-de-France, Martinique

Sport
- Country: France
- Sport: Athletics
Medal record
Men's athletics
Representing France
European Championships
Silver medal – second place	1966 Budapest	High jump

John Robert Sainte-Rose (born 5 July 1943) is a French high jumper. Sainte-Rose would start athletics at twelve years old and would represent a sports club. Alongside the sport, he would also practice basketball and association football, joining another club. He would compete in at the inaugural Friendship Games in Abidjan and would eventually join the Bataillon de Joinville, focusing on the high jump.

Sainte-Rose would rank first in France in the event for five straight years, winning a national title. He would be selected to compete for the nation at the 1964 Summer Olympics but would not advance to the finals of his event. He would then compete at the 1966 European Athletics Championships and would win a silver medal. After the Championships, he would become the French champion in the high jump for five straight years and held the French national record in the event for four years.

He would also be selected for the 1968 Summer Olympics, qualifying for the finals and placing ninth overall in the men's high jump. During his sports career, he would compete in 43 international athletics competitions representing France.

== Career ==
John Robert Sainte-Rose was born on 5 July 1943 in Fort-de-France, Martinique. Sainte-Rose would begin athletics at twelve years old and would represent the sports club Club Colonial. He was selected as a last-minute entry in an interschool competition after his teammate withdrew. There, he would win the men's high jump with a height of 1.70 metres. Alongside athletics, he would also practice basketball and association football and joined the Good Luck Sports Club.

In his international career, he would compete in 1961 at the inaugural Friendship Games in Abidjan. Upon his return from the Games, he would join the Bataillon de Joinville and specifically focused on the high jump. After that, he would rank first in France for five consecutive years in the event and would win a national title. Sainte-Rose would then be selected to compete for France at the 1964 Summer Olympics in Tokyo, Japan.

There, he would compete in the qualifying round of the men's high jump on 20 October against 28 other competitors. His highest distance would be a height of 2 metres, which would place him 22nd in the round, not qualifying him for the finals of the event. After the 1964 Summer Games, he would compete at the 1966 European Athletics Championships in Budapest, Hungary. There, he would win a silver medal in the men's high jump with a height of 2.12 metres. He would also become the first Martiniquais athlete to medal at an edition of the Championships.

After the Championships, he would become the French champion in the high jump for five years straight. Sainte-Rose would also hold the French national record in the event from 1964 until 1968. He would then be selected to compete for France at the 1968 Summer Olympics in Mexico City, Mexico, competing in the same event.

In the qualifying round of the men's high jump, he would be credited with a highest jump of 2.12 metres and would qualify for the finals. In the finals, his highest distance cleared would be 2.09 metres, placing him ninth overall. During his sports career, he would compete in 43 international athletics competitions representing France. Later in his life, he would be part of the 2024 Summer Olympics torch relay.
