= Michel Portmann =

Swiss high jumper

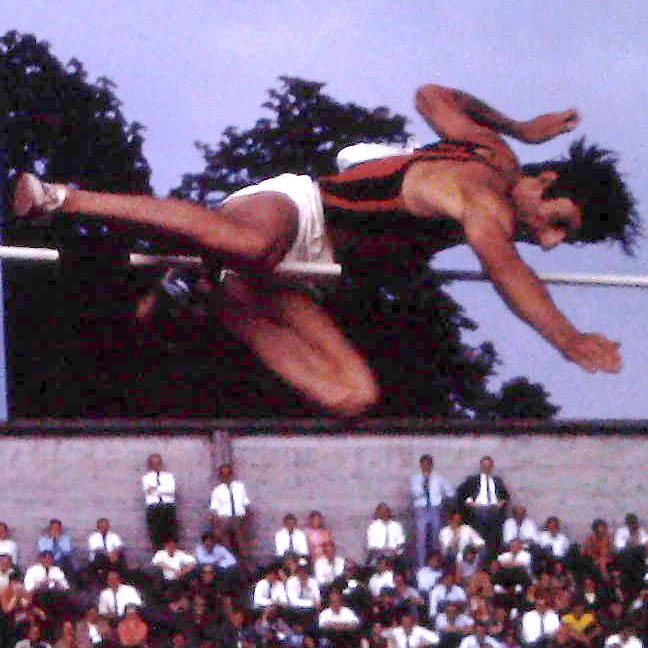
- Michel Portmann,1969

Personal information
- Nationality: Swiss
- Born: 26 August 1941 (age 84)

Sport
- Sport: Athletics
- Event: High jump

Michel Portmann (born 26 August 1941) is a Swiss athlete. He competed in the men's high jump at the 1968 Summer Olympics.
