= Valeriy Skvortsov =

Russian-Soviet high jumper (1945–2021)

Personal information
- Born: 31 May 1945 Berdychiv, Ukrainian SSR, Soviet Union
- Died: 24 September 2021 (aged 76)
Medal record
Men's athletics
Representing the Soviet Union
European Championships
Bronze medal – third place	1966 Budapest	High Jump
Universiade
Gold medal – first place	1965 Budapest	High Jump

Valeriy Sergeyevich Skvortsov (Russian: Валерий Скворцов; (31 May 1945 – 24 September 2021) was a high jumper who represented the USSR in the 1964 and 1968 Summer Olympics.

Skvortsov was first noticed by Soviet high jump coach Viktor Lonsky, who offered him training in a converted sports gym located within the walls of an old Catholic cathedral. His sports career began to accelerate as he won various local high jump competitions and later was invited to Moscow to train for the Soviet Olympic team.

Skvortsov had subsequently participated in the Tokyo Olympic Games of 1964, where he took the 14th place in the high-jump final with a jump height of 2.06 meters. Valeriy Brumel from the Soviet Union), and John Thomas from the United States won the gold and silver medals, respectively.

At the 1966 European Indoor Games championship in Dortmund, West Germany, Skvortsov won first place with a career best jump of 2.17 meters. At the 1968 European Indoor Games he successfully defended his title as the European high jump champion winning first place again with 2.17 meters.

Skvortsov participated in the 1968 Summer Olympics in Mexico City, where he competed with Dick Fosbury and Valentin Gavrilov. His 2.16 meter jump secured him a fourth-place finish.

After a leg injury forced him to stop competing, Skortsov continued as a high jump trainer in Moscow (Dinamo) and then went to work as the head of Duma security. Skvortsov was retired and lived in Moscow, Russia.
