= Ingomar Sieghart =

German high jumper

Personal information
- Nationality: German
- Born: 10 September 1943 (age 82) Ostrau, Nazi Germany

Sport
- Sport: Athletics
- Event: High jump

Ingomar Sieghart (born 10 September 1943) is a German athlete. He competed in the men's high jump at the 1968 Summer Olympics and the 1972 Summer Olympics.
